= List of battles 1301–1600 =

== Early 14th century (1301–1350) ==
Year	War	Battle	Loc.	Date(s)	Description
1302	Franco-Flemish War	Battle of the Golden Spurs	(Belgium)	11 July	In Flanders, Flemish forces led by William of Jülich and Pieter de Coninck defeat French knights.
1302	Byzantine–Ottoman Wars	Battle of Bapheus	(Turkey)	27 July	The founder of the Ottoman dynasty Osman I defeats a Byzantine force.
1303	First War of Scottish Independence	Battle of Roslin	(Scotland)	24 Feb	Scottish forces led by John Comyn III ambush and defeat an English army at Roslin.
1303	Wars between the Kingdom of Mewar and the Delhi Sultanate	Siege of Chittorgarh	(India)	28 Jan—26 Aug	The Delhi Sultanate defeats and conquers the Guhilas of Medapata.
1303	Franco-Flemish War	Battle of Arques	(Belgium)	4 April	Flemish forces led by William of Jülich defeat a French army at Arques.
1303	Mongol invasions of the Levant	Battle of Marj al-Saffar	(Syria)	20–22 April	Mamluk forces defeat the Ilkhanate and their Armenian allies, last Mongol invasion of Syria.
1303	Liège-Brabant wars	Siege of Maastricht	(Netherlands)	May	The Prince-Bishopric of Liège fails to conquer Maastricht from the Duchy of Brabant.
1303	Byzantine–Ottoman Wars	Battle of Dimbos	(Turkey)		Ottoman forces defeat Byzantine governors.
1303	Introduction of Islam in Bangladesh	Conquest of Sylhet	(Bangladesh)		Muslims led by Shamsuddin Firuz Shah conquer the Hindu Gour Kingdom led by Gour Govinda.
1303	Franco-Flemish War	Siege of Amsterdam	(Netherlands)		William of Avesnes, commanding an army of the County of Holland captures Amsterdam from Jan I van Amstel, lord of Amstelland.
1303	Franco-Flemish War	Siege of Zierikzee	(Netherlands)	1303—1304	A Flemish army under Guy of Namur fails to capture Zierikzee.
1304	First War of Scottish Independence	Battle of Happrew	(Scotland)	Feb	English forces defeat a small Scottish army.
1304	First War of Scottish Independence	Second siege of Stirling Castle	(Scotland)	April—24 July	King Edward I besieges the Scots successfully. The Warwolf siege engine is constructed and first used during this battle.
1304	Franco-Flemish War	Siege of Schoonhoven	(Netherlands)	July	William of Avesnes, commanding the army of the County of Holland defeats rebel Schoonhoven.
1304	Franco-Flemish War	Battle of Zierikzee	(Netherlands)	10-11 Aug	A combined fleet from France, Genoa and Holland defeats a Flemish fleet.
1304	Franco-Flemish War	Battle of Mons-en-Pévèle	(France)	18 Aug	French forces under King Philip IV defeat the Flemish army at Mons-en-Pévèle. The battle is indecisive, which leads later to the Treaty of Athis-sur-Orge.
1304	Franco-Flemish War	Battle on the Manpad	(Netherlands)		Witte van Haemstede, commanding an army of the County of Holland defeats a Flemish army under Guy of Namur near Heemstede.
1305	Byzantine–Frankish conflicts	Battle of Apros	(Turkey)	July	Byzantine forces under Co-Emperor Michael IX are defeated by the Catalan Company in Thrace.
1305	Mongol invasions of India	Battle of Amroha	(India)	20 Dec	The Delhi Sultanate defeats the invading Mongol forces of the Chagatai Khanate.
1306	First War of Scottish Independence	Battle of Methven	(Scotland)	19 June	English forces under Aymer de Valence defeat the newly crowned Robert the Bruce and the Scottish army, during a surprise attack on his camp at Methven.
1306	Crusades	Hospitaller conquest of Rhodes	(Greece)	23 June 1306—15 Aug 1310	Rhodes is conquered by the Hospitallers.
1306	Wars of Scottish Independence	Battle of Dalrigh	(Scotland)	July	Robert the Bruce is defeated by rival Scottish forces under John of Argyll of the Clan MacDougall at Dalrigh (also called "King's Field").
1307	Wars of Scottish Independence	Battle of Loch Ryan	(Scotland)	Feb	Scottish forces under Thomas de Brus and Alexander de Brus are defeated by rival Scots at Loch Ryan.
1307	Wars of Scottish Independence	Battle of Glen Trool	(Scotland)	April	Scottish forces under King Robert the Bruce ambush and defeat the English army at Glen Trool.
1307	Wars of Scottish Independence	Battle of Loudoun Hill	(Scotland)	10 May	Scottish forces under Robert the Bruce defeat the English army at Loudoun Hill.
1307		Battle of Lucka	(Germany)	31 May	Frederick I, Margrave of Meissen defeats king Albert I of Germany.
1308	Wars of Scottish Independence	Battle of Inverurie	(Scotland)	23 May	Scottish forces under Robert the Bruce defeat the rival Scots of the Clan Comyn at Oldmeldrum.
1308	Wars of Scottish Independence	Battle of the Pass of Brander	(Scotland)	August	Scottish forces under Robert the Bruce defeat the rival Scots of the Clan MacDougall at the Pass of Brander.
1308	Campaigns of Alauddin Khalji of Delhi Sultanate	Siege of Siwana	(India)		Delhi forces conquer Siwana fortress in Rajasthan (North India).
1308	Campaigns of Alauddin Khalji of Delhi Sultanate	Siege of Devagiri	(India)		Alauddin Khalji takes Yadava capital, annexing Yadava territories for the Delhi Sultanate.
1309	Reconquista	Siege of Algeciras	(Spain)	July 1309—Jan 1310	Castile forced to withdraw siege on Granada city.
1309	Reconquista	Siege of Almería	(Spain)	Aug—Dec	Aragonese forces under King James II besiege the Saracen garrison at Almería. After two months, James is forced to break off the siege.
1309	Reconquista	First siege of Gibraltar	(Gibraltar)	12 Sep	Castilian forces under King Ferdinand IV besiege and capture the Moorish fortress at Gibraltar.
1310		Battle of Opočno	(Czech Republic)	1 Jan	A Czech army under Ctibor of Hungary, fighting for king Henry of Bohemia defeat an army of the Duchy of Swabia under Walter of Castello, fighting for duke Frederick the Fair of Austria.
1310	Campaigns of Alauddin Khalji of Delhi Sultanate	Siege of Warangal	(India)	16-19 Feb	Delhi forces sack the capital of the Kakatiya dynasty, leading to their inevitable annexation in the coming years.
1311	Campaigns of Alauddin Khalji of Delhi Sultanate	Siege of Dwarasamudra	(India)	26-27 Feb	Hoysala Empire surrenders and agrees to pay tribute to Delhi Sultanate.
1311	Byzantine–Frankish conflicts	Battle of Halmyros	(Greece)	15 March	Catalan Company defeats Walter V, Count of Brienne of Athens and goes on to capture Athens and Thebes.
1311	Lithuanian Crusade	Battle of Wopławki	(Poland)	7 April	The Teutonic Knights under Heinrich von Plötzke defeat the Lithuanian forces near the village of Wopławki.
1311	Italienzug	Siege of Brescia	(Italy)	19 May—19 Sep	Henry VII, King of the Romans captures rebel Brescia.
1312	Guelphs and Ghibellines	Battle of Soncino	(Italy)	16 Mar	Ghibellines under Galeazzo I Visconti and Brescia defeat Guelphs under Passerino Della Torre, Cremona, Crema, Bergamo and Soncino.
1312	Charles I's wars for the centralized power	Battle of Rozgony	(Hungary)	15 June	Hungarian forces under King Charles I defeat the rebel army of Palatine Amadeus Aba at Rozgony.
1312	Crusades	Battle of Amorgos	(Greece)		Knights Hospitaller destroy the fleet of Menteshe.
1312		Battle of Gallipoli	(Turkey)		2,000 Turcopoles are annihilated by a combined Byzantine, Kingdom of Serbia, and Genoese force.
1312	Mongol invasions of the Levant	Siege of al-Rahba	(Syria)	23 December 1312 – 26 January 1313	Mamluk victory over Ilkhanate.
1313	Conflict over Bavarian tutelage	Battle of Gammelsdorf	(Germany)	9 Nov	Louis the Bavarian defeats his cousin Frederick I of Austria.
1314	First War of Scottish Independence	Battle of Bannockburn	(Scotland)	23–24 June	Scottish forces under Robert the Bruce defeat King Edward II. Robert takes Stirling Castle and secures Scottish independence.
1315	Armenian-Mamluk Wars	Siege of Malatya	(Turkey)	28 A[ro;	Mamluks led by Tankiz the Syrian viceroy annex Malatya from Armenian Cilicia.
1315	Conflict between Louis IV of Bavaria and Frederick I of Habsburg	Battle of Holíč	(Slovakia)	12 July	King John of Bohemia defeats Matthew III Csák.
1315	First War of Scottish Independence	Siege of Carlisle	(England)	22 July—1 Aug	Scottish forces led by Robert the Bruce besiege unsuccessfully Carlisle Castle.
1315	Wars of the Guelphs and Ghibellines	Battle of Montecatini	(Italy)	29 Aug	Pisa defeats allied forces of Florence and the Kingdom of Naples.
1315	First War of Scottish Independence	Battle of Moiry Pass	(Northern Ireland)	Sep	Scottish-Irish forces under Edward Bruce defeat an Irish garrison at Moyry Pass.
1315	Growth of the Old Swiss Confederacy	Battle of Morgarten	(Switzerland)	15 Nov	Swiss forces defeat Leopold I, Duke of Austria on the shore of the Ägerisee.
1316	Campaigns of Ferdinand of Majorca	Battle of Picotin	(Greece)	22 Feb	Ferdinand of Majorca defeats Matilda of Hainaut and the Achaean barons loyal to her.
1316	First War of Scottish Independence	Battle of Skaithmuir	(Scotland)	Feb	Scottish forces under James Douglas defeat an English raiding party near Coldstream.
1316	Campaigns of Ferdinand of Majorca	Battle of Manolada	(Greece)	5 July	Louis of Burgundy defeats the Majorcans, Ferdinand of Majorca is slain.
1316	First War of Scottish Independence	Second Battle of Athenry	(Republic of Ireland)	10 Aug	English forces defeat an Irish army under Felim O'Connor, king of Connacht.
1316	North German Margrave War	Battle of Gransee	(Germany)	Aug	A North German-Danish alliance led by Henry II of Mecklenburg defeat Waldemar the Great.
1317		Battle of Bortenevskaya	(Russia)	22 Dec	Grand prince Mikhail of Vladimir-Suzdal defeats prince Yury of Moscow and commander Kavgady of the Golden Horde.
1317		Battle of Debrecen	(Hungary)		Hungarian royalists under Dózsa Debreceni defeat James Borsa.
1317	Byzantine–Ottoman wars	Siege of Bursa	(Turkey)	1317—6 April 1326	Ottoman forces led by Sultan Orhan capture the fortified city of Bursa.
1318	Battle of Fajj al-Naam		(Tunisia)		A battle fought between the forces of the Hafsid caliph Abu Yahya Abu Bakr II and the Arab rebel Abu Darba.
1318	First War of Scottish Independence	Battle of Dysert O'Dea	(Republic of Ireland)	10 May	Irish forces under Ó Deághaidh defeat the English Lordship.
1318	First War of Scottish Independence	Battle of Faughart	(Republic of Ireland)	14 Oct	English forces defeat a Scots–Irish army under Edward Bruce, who is slain.
1318	War of the Limburg Succession	Siege of Sittard	(Netherlands)		John III, Duke of Brabant captures Sittard from Reinoud van Valkenburg.
1319		Battle of the Vega of Granada	(Spain)	25 Jun	Sultan Ismail I of Granada defeats Castile under the regents Peter of Castile, Lord of Cameros and John of Castile, Lord of Valencia de Campos.
1319		Battle of Chios	(Greece)	23 July	The Knights Hospitaller and the Genoese of the Lordship of Chios score victory over an Aydinid fleet.
1319		Battle of Wöhrden	(Germany)	7 Sep	The farmers of Dithmarschen defeat an army of knights from Holstein and Mecklenburg under Gerhard III, Count of Holstein-Rendsburg.
1319	Irinjin's revolt	Battle of Zanjan-Rud	(Iran)		The Ilkhanate general Chupan suppresses revolt by the viceroy Irinjin.
1320	Byzantine–Frankish conflicts	Battle of Saint George	(Greece)	9 Sep	Byzantine forces under Andronikos Asen ambush and defeat the army of the Principality of Achaea, securing possession of Arcadia.
1320		Battle of Rhodes	(Greece)		A Turkish invasion fleet is destroyed by the Knights Hospitaller and the Genoese, in an attempt to capture Rhodes.
1320		Battle of Marra Biete	(Ethiopia)		Ethiopians defeat Sultanate of Ifat.
1321	Guelphs and Ghibellines	Battle of Bardi	(Italy)	29 Nov	Ghibellines under Galeazzo I Visconti of Milan with Manfredo dei Landi, Corradino Malaspina and Alessandro Pallavicini defeat the Guelphs under condottiero Ramon de Cardona of the Papal States with Cremona, Piacenza, the Della Torre family, Brescia, Bologna, the Republic of Florence, the Republic of Siena and the Patria del Friuli.
1322	Despenser War	Battle of Burton Bridge	(England)	7–10 March	English Royal forces defeat a rebel English army.
1322	Despenser War	Battle of Boroughbridge	(England)	16 March	English Royal forces defeat a rebel English army fighting for the Scots.
1322		Battle of Bliska	(Croatia)	Aug—Sep	A coalition of Croatian noblemen defeat Mladen II Šubić of Bribir, Ban of Croatia.
1322		Battle of Mühldorf	(Germany)	28 Sep	Louis the Bavarian defeats and captures Frederick I of Austria.
1323		Siege of Warangal	(India)	13 March—9 Nov	Delhi Sultanate conquers Kakatiya Empire.
1323	Aragonese conquest of Sardinia	Siege of Villa di Chiesa	(Italy)	28 June 1323—7 Feb 1324	Aragonese capture Sardinian town from Pisa.
1324	Aragonese conquest of Sardinia	Battle of Lucocisterna	(Italy)	29 Feb	Aragon conquers Sardinia from the Republic of Pisa.
1325	Savoy-Viennois wars	Battle of Varey	(France)	7 Aug	Vienne under Guigues de la Tour-du-Pin defeat the Savoyards.
1325	Guelphs and Ghibellines and War of the Bucket	Battle of Zappolino	(Italy)	15 Nov	Communal struggle between Bologna and Modena, Modena emerges victorious.
1326	Invasion of England	Siege of Bristol	(England)	18-26 Oct	Queen Isabella of France besieges and captures Bristol after an eight-day siege.
1327	Siege of Béjaïa	Battle of Temzezdekt	(Algeria)		Zayyanid Kingdom of Tlemcen defeats Hafsid dynasty.
1327	Campaigns of Alauddin Khalji of Delhi Sultanate	Sack of Halebidu	(India)		Delhi Sultanate sacks capital of the Hoysala Kingdom.
1328	Peasant revolt in Flanders	Battle of Cassel	(France)	23 Aug	French under Philip VI defeat a revolting Flemish peasant army, killing their leaders.
1328	Byzantine–Ottoman wars	Siege of Nicaea	(Turkey)	1328—1331	The Byzantine city of Nicaea falls to Ottomans under Orhan.
1329	Lithuanian Crusade	Siege of Medvėgalis	(Lithuania)	1 Feb	Teutonic Order captures Lithuanian fortress.
1329	Byzantine–Ottoman Wars	Battle of Pelekanon	(Turkey)	10 June	The second ruler of the Ottoman dynasty, Orhan I, defeats the Byzantines under Emperor Andronicus III. This completes the Ottoman conquest of Bithynia.
1329	Norman wars in Ireland	Battle of Ardnocher	(Republic of Ireland)	10 Aug	Irish force led by William MacGeoghegan defeats English army under Thomas Butler, who is killed.
1330	Bulgarian–Serbian wars	Battle of Velbazhd	(Bulgaria)	28 July	Serbia defeats Bulgaria and their Wallachian allies. Michael III of Bulgaria killed in battle.
1330	Hungarian-Wallachian Wars	Battle of Posada	(Romania)	9 Nov	Basarab I of Wallachia defeats Charles I of Hungary.
1330	Norman wars in Ireland	Battle of Fiodh-an-Átha	(Republic of Ireland)		Ualgarg O'Rourke is defeated by the English.
1331	Polish-Teutonic War	Battle of Płowce	(Poland)	27 Sep	Kingdom of Poland defeats Teutonic Order.
1332		Battle of Das	(Ethiopia)	3 July	Ethiopians led by their Emperor Amda Seyon defeat combined attack of Adal and Sultanate of Ifat in the Ethiopian mainland.
1332	Byzantine–Bulgarian Wars	Battle of Rusokastro	(Bulgaria)	18 July	Bulgarians defeat Byzantines.
1332	Second War of Scottish Independence	Battle of Kinghorn	(Scotland)	6 Aug	Donnchadh IV, Earl of Fife defeated by smaller army supporting Edward Balliol, pretender to the Scottish throne.
1332	Second War of Scottish Independence	Battle of Dupplin Moor	(Scotland)	11 Aug	English supporting Edward Balliol, Scottish pretender, defeat the Scots.
1332	Guelphs and Ghibellines	Battle of San Felice	(Italy)	25 Nov	The Holy Roman Empire under Charles of Luxembourg defeats the Signoria of Ferrara, the Signoria of Mantua, the Signoria of Milan and the Signoria of Verona under condottiere Giovi da Camposampiero.
1332	Wars of Scottish Independence	Battle of Annan	(Scotland)	16 Dec	Bruce loyalists drive out the English-backed usurper to the Scottish throne Edward Balliol.
1332		Battle of Zeila	(Somalia)		Ethiopians defeat and vassalize Sultanate of Ifat, sack their capital and imprison their Sultan Ali ibn Sabr ad-Din.
1333	Second War of Scottish Independence	Battle of Halidon Hill	(England)	19 July	Edward III of England avenges Bannockburn.
1334	Liège-Brabant wars	Siege of Maastricht	(Netherlands)	March	After a short siege, Maastricht surrenders to bishop Adolph de la Marck of Liège.
1334		Battle of Adramyttion	(Turkey)	Autumn	A naval coalition of Venice, the Knights Hospitaller, Cyprus, the Papal states and France under captain Pietro Zeno of Venice, defeat bey Yakhshi of the Karasids.
1335	Second War of Scottish Independence	Battle of Boroughmuir	(Scotland)	30 July	Scotland under John Randolph, 3rd Earl of Moray defeats an army of the County of Namur under Guy II, Marquis of Namur, fighting for England.
1336		Battle of Jaghatu	(Iran)	Spring	Governor Ali Padshah of Baghdad defeats Il-Khan Arpa Ke'un of the Ilkhanate.
1336	Nanboku-chō Wars	Battle of Minatogawa	(Japan)	5 July	Kusunoki Masashige, obeying Emperor Go-Daigo's orders, leads an imperial army into defeat by the Ashikaga. Kusunoki commits suicide.
1336		Battle of Qara Darra	(Turkey)	24 July	Governor Hasan Buzurg of Rum defeats Il-Khan Musa of the Ilkhanate.
1336		Battle of Dermantsi	(Bulgaria)		Emperor Ivan Alexander of Bulgaria defeats despot Belaur of Vidin.
1336		Battle of Villanueva de Barcarrota	(Spain)		Castile defeats Portugal
1337	Nanboku-chō Wars	Siege of Kanegasaki	(Japan)	Jan—April	Ashikaga victory.
1337	Hundred Years' War	Battle of Cadzand	(Netherlands)	Nov	English defeat pro-French garrison of Cadsand in Flanders.
1338	Hundred Years' War	Battle of Arnemuiden	(Netherlands)	23 Sep	French victory over the English fleet.
1339		Battle of Parabiago	(Italy)	21-22 Feb	Rebel Lodrisio Visconti is defeated by the Visconti of Milan's army.
1339	Hundred Years' War	Siege of Cambrai	(France)	Sep—Oct	King Edward III of England withdraws when a large French army was near and fails to capture Cambrai.
1340	Hundred Years' War	Battle of Sluys	(Netherlands)	24 June	Edward III defeats the Franco-Genoese fleet of Philip VI of France off the coast of Flanders and gains control of the English Channel.
1340	Hundred Years' War	Battle of Saint-Omer	(France)	26 July	Anglo-Flemish force driven back from the town by a French army.
1340	Hundred Years' War	Siege of Tournai	(Belgium)	23 July—25 Sep	King Edward III of England fails to capture Tournai from king Philip VI of France.
1340	Reconquista	Battle of Río Salado	(Spain)	30 Oct	Alfonso XI of Castile and Afonso IV of Portugal defeat the Marinid under Sultan Abul-Hassan and the Granadine under King Yusuf I.
1341	Breton War of Succession	Battle of Champtoceaux	(France)	13-16 Oct	Begins the Breton War of Succession. France, under Charles of Blois-Châtillon defeats England under count John of Montfort.
1341	Galicia–Volhynia Wars	Battle of the Vistula River	(Poland)		King Casimir III the Great of Poland defeats lord Dmytro Dedko of the Kingdom of Galicia–Volhynia.
1342		Battle of Guadalmesí	(Spain)	8 Apr	Castile and Portugal defeat the Marinid dynasty.
1342		Battle of Kannanur	(India)	March—8 Sep	Madurai Sultanate defeats and executes Veera Ballala III, ending the Hoysala Empire.
1342	Breton War of Succession	Battle of Brest	(France)	18 Aug	English fleet defeats Genoese mercenaries.
1342	Breton War of Succession	Battle of Morlaix	(France)	30 Sep	Besieged by the English, a French relief army broke the siege of Morlaix. When the English retreated into a wood, the French withdrew.
1344	Smyrniote crusades	Battle of Pallene	(Greece)	13 May	A fleet of Venice, the Knights Hospitaller, Cyprus and the Papal States defeat Turkish raiders.
1344	Byzantine civil war	Battle of Stephaniana	(Greece)	May	Turks from the Emirate of Aydin defeat a Serbian army in northern Greece.
1345	Wars of the Guelphs and Ghibellines	Battle of Gamenario	(Italy)	22 April	Ghibelline Asti and John II, Marquess of Montferrat defeat the Neapolitan Guelph League army.
1345	Friso-Hollandic Wars	Siege of Utrecht	(Netherlands)	8 June—22 July	William II, Count of Hainaut and of Holland captures Utrecht and forces bishop John of Arkel to submission.
1345	Byzantine civil war	Battle of Peritheorion	(Greece)	7 July	A Byzantine-Turkish army under John VI Kantakouzenos and Umur Bey defeats and kills the renegade lord Momchil in the Rhodope.
1345	Polish–Bohemian War	Battle of Lelów	(Poland)	July	Poland and Hungary defeat Bohemia.
1345	Polish–Bohemian War	Battle of Pogoń	(Poland)	July	Poland defeats Bohemia.
1345	Friso-Hollandic Wars	Battle of Warns	(Netherlands)	26 Sep	Frisians defeat Dutch invasion force led by William IV, Count of Holland.
1345	Hundred Years' War	Battle of Auberoche	(France)	21 Oct	English relief army lift a siege by the French.
1345	Genoese–Mongol Wars	Second Siege of Kaffa	(Ukraine) / (Russia)	1345—1347	The Golden Horde again lays siege to the Genoese city of Kaffa on the Black Sea, but withdraws due to the Black Death.
1345		Battle of Lough Neagh	(Northern Ireland)		Naval battle between Hugh O'Neill and the Clann Hugh Buidhe.
1346	Breton War of Succession and Hundred Years' War	Battle of St Pol de Léon	(France)	9 June	English defeat the French.
1346	Hundred Years' War	Battle of Caen	(France)	26 July	English force capture and sack the town.
1346	Hundred Years' War	Battle of Blanchetaque	(France)	24 Aug	English under Edward III cross the Somme.
1346	Hundred Years' War	Battle of Crécy	(France)	26 Aug	English longbowmen defeat French cavalry at Abbeville.
1346	Hundred Years' War	Siege of Calais	(France)	4 Sep 1346—3 Aug 1347	English forces capture the city.
1346	Hundred Years' War and Second War of Scottish Independence	Battle of Neville's Cross	(England)	17 Oct	English defeat the Scots under King David Bruce.
1346		Battle of Calry Lough Gill	(Republic of Ireland)		O'Rourke soundly defeated by the O'Connors.
1347	Smyrniote crusades	Battle of Imbros	(Turkey)	Late April	A navy of Venice, the Knights Hospitaller and other Latins defeat the Sarukhanids and the Aydinids.
1347	Cola di Rienzo conflict	Battle of Porta San Lorenzo	(Italy)	Nov	The people of Rome defeat the baronial troops of Stefano Colonna.
1347	War of the Breton Succession	Battle of La Roche-Derrien	(France)		English relief army lift a French siege.
1348	Lithuanian Crusade	Battle of Strėva	(Lithuania)	2 Feb	Teutonic Order defeats the Grand Duchy of Lithuania.
1348		Battle of Épila	(Spain)	21 Jul	King Peter IV of Aragon defeats the anti-royalist Union of Aragon.
1348		Battle of Mislata	(Spain)	9 Dec	King Peter IV of Aragon defeats the anti-royalist Union of Valencia.
1349	Hundred Years' War	Battle of Lunalonge	(France)	May or June	Anglo-Gascons hold the upper hand during the day over the French but the Anglo-Gascons have to withdraw during the night.
1349		Battle of Llucmajor	(Spain)	25 Oct	James IV of Majorca defeated and killed by troops of Aragon.
1349	Rise of the Kano Sultanate	Battle of Santolo	(Nigeria)		Newly Islamic Sultanate of Kano defeats animist Hausa Kingdom of Santolo.
1350	Hundred Years' War	Battle of Calais	(France)	1 Jan	English force defeated a French army which was attempting to take the city.
1350	Hook and Cod wars	Battle of Naarden	(Netherlands)	15 or 16 May	The army of Margaret II, Countess of Hainaut and of Holland defeats the army of her son, William I, Duke of Bavaria.
1350	Hundred Years' War	Les Espagnols sur Mer	(England)	29 Aug	English fleet defeats Castilian fleet.

== Late 14th century (1351–1400) ==
Year	War	Battle	Loc.	Date(s)	Description
1351	Breton War of Succession	Combat of the Thirty	(France)	26 March	Thirty French knights from Chateau Josselin under Jean de Beaumanoir call out and defeat thirty English knights under Robert Bemborough.
1351	Hook and Cod wars	Siege of Medemblik	(Netherlands)	March—April	William I, Duke of Bavaria captures Medemblik.
1351	Hundred Years' War	Battle of Saintes	(France)	1 April	English relief army lifted a French siege.
1351	Hundred Years' War	Battle of Ardres	(France)	6 June	French defeated the English.
1351	Hook and Cod wars	Battle of Veere	(Netherlands)	10 June	The fleet of Margaret II, Countess of Hainaut defeats the fleet of her son William I, Duke of Bavaria, after which Margaret captures Zeeland.
1351	Hook and Cod wars	Battle of Zwartewaal	(Netherlands)	3–5 July	The Cod fleet of William I defeats the Hook fleet of his mother Margaret II.
1351	Hook and Cod wars	Siege of Geertruidenberg	(Netherlands)	Oct 1351—18 Aug 1352	William I, Duke of Bavaria captures Geertruidenberg.
1352	Breton War of Succession	Battle of Mauron	(France)	14 Aug	Anglo-Bretons defeated the French.
1354	Byzantine–Ottoman wars	Fall of Gallipoli	(Turkey)	March	Ottoman Turks under Sultan Orhan capture Gallipoli, giving them a bridgehead into Europe.
1354	War of the Straits	Battle of Sapienza	(Greece)	4 Nov	Genoans destroy Venetian fleet.
1356	Hook and Cod wars	Battle of Soest	(Netherlands)	14 March	The army of Bavaria-Straubing and the County of Holland defeats the army of the Prince-Bishopric of Utrecht.
1356		Battle of Scheut	(Belgium)	17 Aug	The Flemish army defending the claim of Louis II, Count of Flanders as duke of Brabant defeats an army of Brabant, supporting Wenceslaus I, Duke of Luxembourg as the new duke.
1356	Hundred Years' War	Battle of Poitiers	(France)	25 Oct	Edward the Black Prince captures King John II of France, France plunges into chaos.
1356		Baile Loch Deacair	(Republic of Ireland)		In southern Connacht.
1357	Majapahit–Sundanese conflicts	Battle of Bubat	(Indonesia)		Majapahit Prime Minister Gajah Mada has the Sunda royal family killed.
1358	Jacquerie	Battle of Mello	(France)	10 June	Army of French nobles crushes the peasant Jacquerie.
1358	Red Turban Rebellions	Siege of Kaifeng	(China)	1357-mid 1358	Red Turbans under Liu Futong capture Kaifeng from the Yuan Dynasty.
1358	Hook and Cod wars	Siege of Heusden	(Netherlands)	1 Sep 1358—20 Feb 1359	The army of Albert I, Duke of Bavaria, count of Holland captures rebel Cod Heusden.
1358	Hook and Cod wars	Siege of Heemskerk	(Netherlands)	4 Dec 1358—24 March 1359	The army of Albert I, Duke of Bavaria, count of Holland captures rebel Cod Heemskerk.
1359	Hook and Cod wars	Siege of Delft	(Netherlands)	11 March—29 May	Albert I of Bavaria and Holland captures rebel Cod controlled Delft.
1359	War of the Two Pedros	Battle of Barcelona	(Spain)	9-11 Jun	A fleet of Aragon defeats a fleet of Castile, Portugal and Granada.
1359		Battle of Achelous	(Greece)	Late Spring	Albanians under John Spata defeat Despotate of Epirus and form several Despotates in parts of their land.
1359		Battle of Campo delle Mosche	(Italy)	23 July	Florentines defeat Great Company.
1359	War of the Two Pedros	Battle of Araviana	(Spain)	22 Sep	Henry of Trastámara and Aragon defeat supporters of king Peter of Castile.
1359	Crusades	Battle of Megara	(Greece)		An allied fleet, commanded by despot Manuel Kantakouzenos of Morea with the Republic of Venice, the Knights Hospitaller and the Principality of Achaea defeats the Ottoman Empire.
1359	Ekdala Wars	Siege of Ekdala	(Bangladesh)		Sikandar Shah of the Bengal Sultanate repels invastion by Delhi Sultanate, ensuring Bengal's independence for centuries.
1360	Red Turban invasions of Goryeo	Battle of Hamjong	(North Korea)	January	Goryeo defeats Red Turbans, inflicting around 20,000 causalties on them and causing them to eventually retreat back to China.
1361	Danish–Hanseatic War	Battle of Visby	(Sweden)	27 July	Poorly armed farmers from the island of Gotland are defeated by a Danish army. The battle became notable after an excavation revealed numerous mass graves containing the dead from the battle, many still wearing their armour.
1362	Reconquista	Battle of Guadix	(Spain)	Jan	Granada defeats Castile.
1362	Lithuanian Crusade	Siege of Kaunas	(Lithuania)	13 March—17 April	Teutonic Order defeats Grand Duchy of Lithuania, captures and razes the Kaunas Castle.
1362		Battle of Brignais	(France)	6 April	Mercenary Free Companies defeat a French army.
1362	Great Troubles	Battle of Blue Waters	(Ukraine)	Autumn 1362 or 1363	The Pagan Lithuanians defeat Islamic Tatar Forces.
1362	Danish–Hanseatic War	Battle of Helsingborg	(Sweden)	8 July	Danish fleet beat Hanseatic fleet.
1363	Red Turban Rebellion	Battle of Lake Poyang	(China)	30 Aug—4 Oct	Ming dynasty decisively defeats Yuan dynasty and kills their commander Chen Youliang.
1364	Hundred Years' War	Battle of Cocherel	(France)	16 May	French defeat Gascon-Navarrese-English.
1364		Battle of Cascina	(Italy)	28 July	Battle between the Republic of Pisa and the Republic of Florence. Florentine victory.
1364	War of the Breton Succession	Battle of Auray	(France)	29 Sep	End of Breton War of Succession, English defeat Franco-Bretons.
1364	Serbian–Ottoman Wars	Battle of Sırpsındığı	(Turkey)		Ottomans decisively defeat Serbs joined by crusader coalition of Bulgaria, Hungary and Wallachia. The Ottomans annexed Adrianople which became their second capital due to this battle and gained a foothold into the Balkans.
1365	Crusades	Sack of Alexandria	(Egypt)	9-12 Oct	Peter I of Cyprus leads Cypriots to take and sack Alexandria for three days.
1365	Byzantine–Ottoman Wars	Battle of Adrianople	(Turkey)		Capture by Ottoman Turks.
1367	Castilian Civil War	Battle of Nájera	(Spain)	3 April	English under the Black Prince and Don Pedro of Castile defeat the Franco-Castilians.
1367		Battle of Dinklar	(Germany)	3 Sep	Gerhard vom Berge, Bishop of Hildesheim, defeats Magnus I, Duke of Brunswick-Lüneburg, Dietrich von Portitz, Archbishop of Magdeburg and Albert von Rickmersdorf, Bishop of Halberstadt.
1367	Crusades	Battle of Tripoli	(Lebanon)	28 Sep	The Mamluk Sultanate defeats king Peter I of Cyprus, the Republic of Genoa and the Knights Hospitaller.
1367		First Albanian Siege of Ioannina	(Greece)	1367—1370	Albanian and Aromanian troops attack Ioannina for three years, ending in a ceasefire.
1368		Battle of Codrii Plonini	(Ukraine)	Jul	Voivode Peter I of Moldavia defeats king Casimir III the Great of Poland and rebel Moldavians under Stephen.
1368	Red Turban Rebellions	Capture of Dadu	(China)		Ming Dynasty captures the Yuan Dynasty capital of Dadu (modern-day Beijing), completing their expulsion of the Yuan from China.
1369		Battle of Pelister Mountain	(North Macedonia)		An alleged armed engagement over territorial claims in southwestern Macedonia including Kastoria, where Serbians under Vukašin of Serbia defeated the Principality of Muzaka.
1369	Castilian Civil War	Battle of Montiel	(Spain)	14 March	Franco-Castilians under King Henry II of Castile defeated Portuguese-Marinids-Grenadines-Jews under his half-brother Don Pedro of Castile, who is captured and executed.
1369	Reconquista	Siege of Algeciras	(Spain)	July	Granada retakes city from Castile.
1369		Battle of Poni	(Brunei)		Majapahit Empire and Bruneian Empire defeat Sulu Sultanate.
1370	Northern Crusades	Battle of Rudau	(Russia)	Feb	Teutonic Knights defeat Lithuanians.
1370	Hundred Years' War	Battle of Pontvallain	(France)	4 Dec	French victory against English.
1370	Timurid conquests and invasions	Siege of Balkh	(Afghanistan)		Timur defeats and has killed his brother-in-law Amir Husayn and gains control of the western Chagatai Khanate.
1371		Battle of Baesweiler	(Germany)	22 Aug	Edward, Duke of Guelders and William II, Duke of Jülich defeat Wenceslaus, Duke of Brabant.
1371	Serbian–Ottoman Wars	Battle of Maritsa	(Greece)	26 Sep	Serbs under their ruler King Vukašin of Serbia- who is killed in battle along with his brother, were defeated by an Ottoman force. Southern Serbia soon annexed by Ottomans.
1372		Battle of the Tuul River	(Mongolia)		Ming Dynasty led by the Hongwu Emperor defeats the Northern Yuan Dynasty at the Tuul River.
1372	Hundred Years' War	Battle of La Rochelle	(France)	22–23 June	Castilian fleet defeats the English fleet. English sea dominance destroyed.
1373	Hundred Years' War	Battle of Chiset	(France)	21 March	French defeat an English relief army trying to lift the siege of Chiset.
1373		Battle of Montichiari	(Italy)	7–8 May	Condottiero John Hawkwood of the Papal States defeats lord Bernabò Visconti of Milan
1373		Battle of Leveste	(Germany)	25 July	Otto I, Count of Schauenburg and Holstein-Pinneberg defeats Magnus II, Duke of Brunswick-Lüneburg. Magnus dies in the battle.
1373	First War of the Guelderian Succession	Siege of Venlo	(Netherlands)		John II, Count of Blois besieges Venlo against his contender William II, Duke of Jülich.
1375	War of the Eight Saints	Cesena Bloodbath	(Italy)	1375—July 1378	2,500/5,000 inhabitants of the Italian city of Cesena are slaughtered by Papal troops led by John Hawkwood.
1375	Byzantine-Latin Wars	Battle of Gardiki	(Greece)		Achaean victory defeats Morean siege
1375	Armenian-Mamluk Wars	Fall of Sis	(Turkey)	13 April	Mamluk Sultanate conquers Cilician Armenia after taking their capital.
1375	Great Troubles	Battle on Pyana River	(Russia)	2 Aug	The Russian troops are defeated, while their commander drowns in the river.
1378		Knights Hospitaller Invasion of Arta	(Greece)	April	Knights Hospitaller attempt to capture the Despotate of Arta but fail.
1378	Great Troubles	Battle of the Vozha River	(Russia)	11 Aug	Moscow defeats the Golden Horde.
1380		Battle of Chioggia	(Italy)	24 Jun	A fleet of the Republic of Venice defeats the Republic of Genoa.
1380	Great Troubles	Battle of Kulikovo	(Russia)	8 Sep	Dmitry Donskoy of Moscow halts the Mongols.
1380		Battle of Dubravnica	(Serbia)	Summer 1380 or Dec 1381	Moravian Serbia defeats the Ottoman Empire.
1380	Frisian War	Battle of Loppersum	(Germany)	End 1380 or early 1381	Chieftain Ocko I tom Brok of Norderland and Emsigerland defeats chieftains Kampo Abdena of Hinte and Folkmar Allena of Osterhusen.
1380		Battle of Jinpo	(South Korea)		A navy built by Goryeo defeats Japanese Wokou pirates. First historical battle involving gunpowder ships.
1381	Peasants' Revolt	Battle of North Walsham	(England)	25 or 26 June	Forces led by Henry le Despenser defeat the rebels of Norfolk at the end of the English Peasants' Revolt.
1381		Battle of Dubravnica	(Serbia)	Summer 1380 or Dec 1381	Serbs defeat Ottomans under Murad I.
1381	Great Troubles	Second Battle of the Kalka River	(Russia)		Tokhtamysh defeats Mamai and gains control of the Blue Horde.
1382	Revolt of Ghent	Battle of Beverhoutsveld	(Belgium)	3 May	Ghent rebels under Philip van Artevelde defeat the army of Louis II, Count of Flanders.
1382	Post-Great Troubles	Siege of Moscow	(Russia)	23-27 Aug	Tokhtamysh of the Golden Horde takes back control of Moscow from the Principality of Moscow.
1382	Revolt of Ghent and Hundred Years' War	Battle of Roosebeke	(Belgium)	27 Nov	French army under King Charles VI of France crush a large Flemish army of urban levies.
1383	Civil war in Greater Poland (1382–1385)	Battle of Szamotuły	(Poland)	15 Feb	The Grzymała family, under starost general Domarat of Pierzchno, defeats the Nałęcze family, under Sędziwój Świdwa.
1383	Ming conquest of Yunnan	Siege of Dengchuan	(China)	February	Ming Dynasty completes conquest of Yunnan.
1383	Hundred Years' War	Battle of Dunkirk	(France)	May	Ghent rebels under Frans Ackerman and an English army under Henry le Despenser defeat the armies of Louis II, Count of Flanders and king Charles VI of France.
1383	Hundred Years' War	Siege of Ypres	(Belgium)	8 June—8 Aug	An English army under Henry le Despenser and Ghent rebels fail to take Ypres from Louis II, Count of Flanders.
1383		Trian Chongail	(Republic of Ireland)		Hugh O Neill and Robin Savage kill each other in a cavalry charge.
1384	1383-1385 Crisis	Battle of Atoleiros	(Portugal)	6 April	Nuno Álvares Pereira (Portuguese general) defeats Castile.
1384	1383-1385 Crisis	Siege of Lisbon	(Portugal)	29 May—3 Sep	Portugal successfully defends its capital from the Castilians.
1384	1383-1385 Crisis	Battle of Tejo	(Portugal)	July	The Portuguese win a naval battle in the Tagus river.
1384	1383-1385 Crisis	Battle of Leça	(Portugal)		The Castilian blockade to Porto is stopped.
1385	1383-1385 Crisis	Battle of Trancoso	(Portugal)	29 May	An army sent by John I of Castile is defeated by the Portuguese.
1385	1383-1385 Crisis	Battle of Aljubarrota	(Portugal)	14 Aug	Portugal maintains independence from Castile, John I establishes Avis dynasty.
1385	Thopia expansionist Wars	Battle of Savra	(Albania)	18 Sep	Zeta (Montenegro) forces under Balša II were defeated by Ottoman commander Hayreddin Pasha near Berat.
1385	1383-1385 Crisis	Battle of Valverde	(Spain)	14 Oct	The Portuguese defeat a Castilian army.
1385	Norman wars in Ireland	Battle of Tochar Cruachain-Bri-Ele	(Republic of Ireland)		O Conchobhair, King of Uí Falighe, soundly defeats the English of Meath.
1386		Battle of the Vikhra River	(Belarus)	29 April	Grand Duchy of Lithuania decisively defeats the Principality of Smolensk and make the principality agree to be their vassal.
1386	Growth of the Old Swiss Confederacy	Battle of Sempach	(Switzerland)	9 July	Swiss defeat Leopold III of Austria.
1386	Timurid invasions of Georgia	Siege of Tbilisi	(Georgia (country))		Timur decisively defeats the Kingdom of Georgia and sacks their capital.
1386	Serbian–Ottoman Wars	Battle of Pločnik	(Serbia)		Serbian victory and first serious defeat for the Ottoman army in the Balkans.
1387		Battle of Castagnaro	(Italy)	11 March	Giovanni Ordelaffi and Ostasio da Polenta, for Verona, defeated by John Hawkwood and Francesco Novello Carraresi, for Padua.
1387	Hundred Years' War	Battle of Margate	(England)	24–25 March	An English fleet under Richard, Earl of Arundel defeats a Franco-Castilian-Flemish wine fleet under Sir Jean de Bucq in the area of the southern North Sea between Margate and Cadzand.
1387		Battle of Radcot Bridge	(England)	19 Dec	Rebellious Lords Appellant defeat a Royal army and briefly gain control of the government.
1387	Timurid Wars	Siege of Isfahan	(Iran)		Timur annexes Isfahan and nearby territories from the Muzaffarids.
1388	Wars of the Hongwu Emperor	Battle of Buir Lake	(China) / (Mongolia)	March	Ming Chinese army under general Lan Yu decisively defeated Mongol Northern Yuan dynasty, more than 100,000 Mongols killed or captured.
1388	Anglo-Scottish Wars	Battle of Otterburn	(England)	19 Aug	English under a young Henry "Hotspur" Percy defeated by Scots under James Douglas, 2nd Earl of Douglas.
1388		Battle of Döffingen	(Germany)	23 Aug	The league of princes and the league of knights under Eberhard II, Count of Württemberg defeat the Swabian League of Cities under 'Städtehauptmann' or military commander Konrad Besserer of Ulm.
1388	Bosnian–Ottoman Wars	Battle of Bileća	(Bosnia and Herzegovina)	27 Aug	Bosnians and Serbians defeat the Ottomans.
1389	Serbian–Ottoman Wars	Battle of Kosovo Polje	(Kosovo)	15 June	A Turkish army gathered by Murad I and a Serbian army under Knez Lazar beat each other into the ground. The battle was a draw, yet in the wake of it the Serbs were left with too few men to effectively defend their lands, while the Turks had many more troops in the east. Both Lazar and Murad lost their lives in the battle.
1390		Battle of Goalpara	(India)		Bengal Sultan Sikandar Shah is killed in battle by forces led by his son Ghiyasuddin.
1390	Lithuanian Civil War (1389-1392)	Siege of Vilnius	(Lithuania)	11 Sept-7 Oct	Grand Duchy of Lithuania led by Skirgaila defends city from siege by Vytautas the Great and the Teutonic Order.
1391	Tokhtamysh–Timur war	Battle of the Kondurcha River	(Russia)	18 June	Timur defeats Tokhtamysh of the Golden Horde.
1391	First Florentine–Milanese War	Battle of Alessandria	(Italy)	25 July	Mercenary army of Gian Galeazzo Visconti of Milan beat that of Jean III of Armagnac.
1392		Battle of Kırkdilim	(Turkey)		Prince Ertuğrul Çelebi of the Ottoman Empire defeats Kadi Burhan al-Din.
1393		Second Siege of Altena Castle	(Netherlands)	July	Albert I, Duke of Bavaria and count of Holland captures rebel Altena Castle.
1394		Battle of Dobor	(Bosnia and Herzegovina)	between 11 and 20 July	King Sigismund of Hungary defeats John Horvat.
1394	Norman wars in Ireland	Battle of Ros-mic-Triuin	(Republic of Ireland)		King of Leinster attacks and defeats the English.
1395		Battle of Ghindăoani	(Romania)	12 feb	Battle between Voivode Stephen I of Moldavia and king Sigismund of Hungary with disputed results.
1395	Tokhtamysh–Timur war	Battle of the Terek River	(Russia)	14 April	Amir Timur of the Timurid Empire decisively defeats Khan Tokhtamysh of the Golden Horde.
1395		Battle of Portomaggiore	(Italy)	16 April	Astorre I Manfredi for the Republic of Venice and Niccolò III d'Este beat Ferrarese rebel Azzo X d'Este.
1395	Ottoman-Wallachian wars	Battle of Rovine	(Romania)	17 May	Mircea cel Batrin the voievod of Wallachia defeated Bayezid I, sultan of the Ottoman Empire.
1396	Friso-Hollandic Wars	Battle of Schoterzijl	(Netherlands)	29 Aug	Albert I, Duke of Bavaria and count of Holland defeats the Frisians.
1396		Hawwara attack on Aswan	(Egypt)	April	Hawwara tribe defeat the governor of Aswan
1396	Clan Cameron-Clan Mackintosh feud	Battle of the North Inch	(Scotland)	Late Sep	Scottish clan battle.
1396	Crusades	Battle of Nicopolis	(Bulgaria)	25 Sep	A major French–Hungarian crusade is defeated by the Ottomans under Bayezid I.
1397		Battle of Kleverhamm	(Germany)	7 June	Adolph I, Duke of Cleves and Dietrich IX, Count of Mark defeat duke William II of Berg and duke William I of Guelders and Jülich.
1397	Ling Kuan rebellion	Siege of Huguang	(China)	October	Ming dynasty puts down rebellion by the Kam people.
1398	Timurid conquests and invasions	Sack of Delhi	(India)	17-20 Dec	Timur defeats the Sultanate of Delhi and sacks their capital, weakening Delhi for a century.
1399	Golden Horde conflicts	Battle of the Vorskla River	(Ukraine)	12 Aug	Vytautas the Great of Lithuania is defeated by generals of Tamerlane.
1399	Norman wars in Ireland	Battle of Tragh-Bhaile	(Republic of Ireland)		The Anglo-Irish defeat the sons of Henry O Neill.

== Early 15th century (1401–50) ==
Year	War	Battle	Loc.	Date(s)	Description	
1400		Battle of Bergtheim	(Germany)	11 Jan	Gerhard von Schwarzburg, bishop of Würzburg, defeats rebel farmers and citizens of the cities.	
1400	Timurid conquests and invasions	Battle of Aleppo	(Syria)	Oct—Nov	Timur decisively defeats the Mamluk Sultanate, destroying their forces attempting to defend Syria.	
1400	Timurid conquests and invasions	Siege of Damascus	(Syria)	Dec 1400—March 1401	Timur defeats Mamluk Sultanate and annexes Damascus.	
1401	Glyndŵr rebellion	Battle of Mynydd Hyddgen	(Wales)	Mid-June	Welsh rebels under Owain Glyndŵr defeat an army of English and Flemish soldiers near Aberystwyth.	
1401	Glyndŵr rebellion	Battle of Tuthill	(Wales)	2 Nov	Inconclusive battle between English and Welsh near Caernarfon.	
1401	Timurid conquests and invasions	Siege of Baghdad	(Iraq)		Timur takes Jalayirid Baghdad and massacres most of the city's inhabitants.	
1402	Third Florentine–Milanese War	Battle of Casalecchio	(Italy)	26 Jan	Alberico da Barbiano for Milan defeats Bolognese–Florentine army under Muzio Attendolo.	
1402	Glyndŵr rebellion	Battle of Bryn Glas	(Wales)	22 June	English army routed in mid-Wales; Owain Glyndŵr's revolt spreads.	
1402	Anglo-Scottish Wars	Battle of Nesbit Moor	(England)	22 June	Clash between English and Scottish prior to the decisive Battle of Homildon Hill.	
1402	Timurid conquests and invasions	Battle of Ankara	(Turkey)	28 July	Timur defeats and captures Ottoman Sultan Bayezid I in Anatolia. Also called the Battle of Angora.	
1402	Arkel War	Siege of Gorinchem	(Netherlands)	29 June—18 Sep	Albert I, Duke of Bavaria and of Holland defeats John V, Lord of Arkel.	
1402	Anglo-Scottish Wars	Battle of Homildon Hill	(England)	14 Sep	A strong Scottish raiding force is heavily defeated by English longbowmen.	
1402		Battle of Tripolje	(Kosovo)	21 Nov	Despot Stefan Lazarević of Serbia and lord Đurađ II Balšić of Zeta defeat lord Đurađ Branković and the Ottoman Empire.	
1402	Timurid conquests and invasions	Siege of Smyrna	(Turkey)	Dec	Timur defeats the Knights of Rhodes and razes Smyrna.	
1403	Glyndŵr Rising	Battle of Shrewsbury	(England)	21 July	Henry IV defeats rebel army led by Henry "Hotspur" Percy, who is slain in the fighting.	
1403	Timurid conquests and invasions	Siege of Birtvisi	(Georgia (country))		Timur besieges fortress of the Georgian Kingdom.	
1403	Ottoman Interregnum	Battle of Ulubad	(Turkey)		Mehmed I defeats İsa Çelebi	
1403		Battle of Ziela	(Somalia)		Ethiopia under Dawit I defeats and kills Sultan Sa'ad ad-Din II, bringing a final conquest to the Ifat Sultanate.	
1405	Glyndŵr Rising	Battle of Pwll Melyn	(Wales)	May	Owain Glyndŵr's rebels defeated near Usk.	
1406		Battle of Nakhchivan	(Azerbaijan)	14 Oct	Sultan Qara Yusuf of Qara Qoyunlu defeats the Timurid Empire under governor Abu Bakr Mirza of Tabriz.	
1406	Norman wars in Ireland	Cluain Immorrais	(Republic of Ireland)		The King of Uí Falighe defeats the Galls of Meath.	
1406	Reconquista	Battle of Collejares	(Spain)		King Henry III of Castile defeats sultan Muhammad VII of Granada.	
1406	Scottish clan wars	Battle of Tuiteam Tarbhach	(Scotland)		Scottish clan battle fought between the Clan MacLeod of Lewis against the Clan MacKay.	
1407	Ming–Hồ War	Battle of Lạng Sơn	(Vietnam)	19 Jan	Ming Chinese forces defeated Đại Ngu forces.	
1407		Siege of Maastricht	(Netherlands)	24 Nov 1407—23 Sep 1408	Rebels from Liège fail to take Maastricht from supporters of bishop John of Bavaria of Liège.	
1407	Ming–Hồ War	Battle of Sông Phú Lương	(Vietnam)		Chinese Ming dynasty decisively defeated the Vietnamese Hồ dynasty, led to the Ming conquest of Đại Ngu.	
1407	Ming treasure voyages	Battle of Palembang	(Indonesia)		Ming dynasty defeats pirates in Sumatra and captures their leader Chen Zuyi.	
1408	Appenzell Wars	Battle of Bregenz	(Austria)	13 Jan	The Swabian knights of Saint Jörgenschild under Duke Ulrich of Teck defeats the Bund ob dem See, a coalition of farmers and cities, including Appenzell, St. Gallen and Switzerland, under Hauptmann (commander) Kupferschmid of Appenzell.	
1408	Percy Rebellion	Battle of Bramham Moor	(England)	19 Feb	The Percy Rebellion is finally crushed by King Henry IV of England.	
1408	Wars of Liège	Battle of Othée	(Belgium)	23 Sep	John the Fearless, Duke of Burgundy defeats rebels from the city of Liège, which greatly enriches him and puts him in a strong position for the Armagnac–Burgundian Civil War.	
1408		Battle of Dobor	(Bosnia and Herzegovina)	Sep	King Sigimund of Hungary defeats Bosnia in a crusade against the Bosnian Bogomils.	
1409	Aragonese conquest of Sardinia	Battle of Sanluri	(Italy)	30 June	Aragon defeats the giudicato di Arborea, last independent kingdom of Sardinia.	
1409	Wars of the Yongle Emperor	Battle of Kherlen	(Mongolia)	23 Sep	The Mongols under Öljei Temür Khan defeat Ming China.	
1410	Ottoman Interregnum	Battle of Kosmidion	(Turkey)	15 Jun	Süleyman Çelebi and Vuk Lazarević defeat Musa Çelebi and despot Stefan Lazarević of Serbia.	
1410	Yongle Emperor's campaigns against the Mongols	Battle of the Onon River	(Mongolia)	15 Jun	Ming dynasty defeat the Mongols.	
1410	Polish–Lithuanian–Teutonic War	Battle of Grunwald	(Poland)	15 July	Polish and Lithuanian army under Władysław II Jagiełło break the spine of the Teutonic Knights under Ulrich von Jungingen. Also called the Battle of Tannenberg.	
1410	Polish–Lithuanian–Teutonic War	Battle of Koronowo	(Poland)	10 Oct	Polish-Lithuania army defeat Teutonic Knights.	
1411		Battle of Roccasecca	(Italy)	19 May	Louis II of Anjou defeats Ladislaus of Naples for the control of the Kingdom of Naples.	
1411	Clan Donald and Stewart royal family wars	Battle of Harlaw	(Scotland)	24 July	Highlanders versus Lowland Scots ends in draw.	
1411	Byzantine–Ottoman wars and Ottoman Interregnum	Siege of Constantinople	(Turkey)		Short and unsuccessful siege of Constantinople by Musa Çelebi.	
1412	Count of Urgell's revolt	Battle of Morvedre	(Spain)		Ferdinand of Antequera defeats James II, Count of Urgell in a civil war in Aragon.	
1412	Armagnac–Burgundian Civil War	Battle of Saint-Rémy-du-Val	(France)	9 May	The Burgundians under Waleran III, Count of Ligny and Philippe d'Harcourt defeat the Armagnacs under John I, Duke of Alençon and Raoul de Gaucourt.	
1412	Armagnac–Burgundian Civil War	Siege of Bourges	(France)	11 June—12 July	After a month of siege, king Charles VI of France decides for a truce with the Armagnacs.	
1412	Armagnac–Burgundian Civil War	Siege of Dreux	(France)	10–15 July	Burgundians capture Dreux from the Armagnacs in a French civil war.	
1412	Campaigns of Qara Yusuf	Battle of Chalagan	(Azerbaijan)	Dec	Kara Koyunlu Turkomans defeat the Georgian army under Constantine I of Georgia and their ally Shirvanshah Ibrahim.	
1412		Sack of Aswan	(Egypt)		Hawwara tribe destroyed the walls of Aswan and left the city in ruins, without inhabitants.	
1413	Ottoman Interregnum	Battle of Çamurlu	(Bulgaria)	5 July	Mehmed I defeats and executes Musa Çelebi, reuniting the Ottoman Empire.	
1414		Siege of Isfahan	(Iran)	21 July	Timurid ruler Shah Rukh defeats his rebelling nephew Iskandar.	
1415	Moroccan–Portuguese conflicts	Conquest of Ceuta	(Spain)	21 Aug	Ceuta is captured by the Portuguese.	
1415	Hundred Years' War	Battle of Agincourt	(France)	25 Oct	An outnumbered English force under Henry V defeats the French through the use of massed longbowmen behind sharpened stakes.	
1416	Hook and Cod wars	First Siege of IJsselstein	(Netherlands)	5–30 May	William II, Duke of Bavaria and count of Holland captures IJsselstein after a truce, which ends the rebellion of John II, Lord of Egmond.	
1416	Ottoman–Venetian Wars	Battle of Gallipoli	(Turkey)	29 May	A Venetian fleet under Pietro Loredan destroys the Ottoman fleet.	
1417	Hook and Cod wars	Second Siege of IJsselstein	(Netherlands)	10–24 June	A Cod army besieged a Hook army in IJsselstein. A truce brokered by John III, Duke of Bavaria makes an end to the siege.	
1417	Great Frisian War	Battle of Okswerderzijl	(Netherlands)	18 June	The Allies (Vetkopers and Bronckhorsts) under Keno II tom Brok, Focko Ukena and Sibet Papinga defeat the Schieringers under Sicko Sjaerda and Coppen Jarges.	
1417	Hook and Cod wars	Siege of Gorinchem	(Netherlands)	23 or 24 Nov—1 Dec	A Hook army defeats a Cod army in the city of Gorinchem.	
1418	Hook and Cod wars	Siege of Dordrecht	(Netherlands)	28 June—10 Aug	An army under Jacqueline, Countess of Hainaut and John IV, Duke of Brabant fails to capture Dordrecht from supporters of John III, Duke of Bavaria.	
1418	Hundred Years' War	Siege of Rouen	(France)	29 July 1418—19 Jan 1419	Henry V of England gains a foothold in Normandy.	
1418	Great Frisian War	Battle of Dokkum	(Netherlands)		Allies under Focko Ukena defeat the Schieringers under Sicko Sjaerda.	
1419	Moroccan–Portuguese conflicts	Siege of Ceuta	(Spain)	13-17 Aug	The Moors attempt to retake Ceuta but are easily repelled by the Portuguese.	
1419	Hussite Wars	Battle of Vysehrad	(Czech Republic)	16 Aug 1419—Nov 1420	Series of engagements between the Hussite forces and the Holy Roman Emperor's crusaders.	
1419	Great Frisian War	Battle of Miedum	(Netherlands)	19 or 20 Aug	Schieringers under Sicko Sjaerda defeat the allies.	
1419	Hussite Wars	Battle of Živohoště	(Czech Republic)	4 Nov	The Hussites defeat Bohemian Catholics commanded by Petr of Sternberg and Jan Ptáček of Pirkštejn	
1419	Hundred Years' War	Battle of la Rochelle	(France)	30 Dec	A Castilian fleet defeats an English-Hanseatic coalition fleet.	
1419	Lam Sơn uprising	Siege of Dong Quan	(Vietnam)	1419—1428	Ming city besieged every year of Lam Son uprising, eventually fell to Le Loi.	
1420	Hussite Wars	Battle of Sudomer	(Czech Republic)	25 March	Hussites led by Jan Žižka defeat Catholics.	
1420	Great Frisian War	Battle on the Palesloot	(Netherlands)	12 May	The Allies under Focko Ukena defeat the Schieringers.	
1420	Hussite Wars	Battle of Vitkov Hill	(Czech Republic)	12 June—14 July	Hussite victory over the Crusaders of the Holy Roman Emperor.	
1420	Hundred Years' War	Siege of Montereau-Fault-Yonnefr	(France)	16 June—1 July	An army under king Henry V of England and duke Philip the Good of Burgundy captures Montereau-Fault-Yonne from the French.	
1420	Hook and Cod wars	Siege of Leiden	(Netherlands)	18 June—17 Aug	An army under John III, Duke of Bavaria captures Leiden from supporters of Jacqueline, Countess of Hainaut.	
1420	Great Frisian War	Battle of Sloten	(Netherlands)	11 July	An army of Schieringers under Sicko Sjaerda and Cods under Hendrik van Renesse defeats the allies (Vetkopers and Bronckhorsts) under Focko Ukena.	
1420	Hook and Cod wars	Siege of Geertruidenberg	(Netherlands)	End Aug—11 Nov	Supporters of John III, Duke of Bavaria defeat supporters of Jacqueline, Countess of Hainaut.	
1421	Hundred Years' War	Battle of Baugé	(France)	22 March	The French and Scottish forces of Charles VII of France commanded by the Earl of Buchan defeat an English army after a reckless cavalry charge by Henry V's younger brother, the Duke of Clarence, who is slain in the fighting.	
1421	Armagnac–Burgundian Civil War	Battle of Mons-en-Vimeu	(France)	30 Aug	The Burgundians under duke Philip the Good defeat the Armagnacs under Jaqcues d'Harcourt, Jean Poton de Xaintrailles and La Hire.	
1421	Hundred Years' War	Siege of Meaux	(France)	6 Oct 1421—10 May 1422	English led by Henry V fight the French.	
1421	Hussite Wars	Battle of Kutna Hora	(Czech Republic)	21 Dec	Hussites escape Royalist forces of Holy Roman Emperor Sigismund.	
1422	Hussite Wars	Battle of Nebovidy	(Czech Republic)	6 Jan	Jan Žižka leads the Hussites to victory over an Imperial army.	
1422	Hussite Wars	Battle of Německý Brod	(Czech Republic)	10 Jan	Hussites sack town.	
1422	Byzantine–Ottoman wars	Siege of Constantinople	(Turkey)	10 June—Sep	Large-scale but unsuccessful siege of Constantinople by the Ottomans.	
1422	Transalpine campaigns	Battle of Arbedo	(Switzerland)	30 June	Milanese led by Francesco Bussone defeat the Swiss.	
1422	Byzantine–Ottoman wars and Ottoman–Venetian wars	Siege of Thessalonica	(Greece)	June 1422—29 March 1430	The city of Thessalonica, ruled by the Republic of Venice, is captured by the Ottoman Empire after a nearly 8-year siege.	
1422	Bavarian War	Battle of Alling	(Germany)	19 Sep	Ernest, Duke of Bavaria-Munich and William III, Duke of Bavaria-Munich defeat Louis VII, Duke of Bavaria-Ingolstadt	
1422	Golub War	Battle of Marienburg	(Poland)	27 Sep	Voivode Alexander the Good of Moldavia defeats grand master Paul von Rusdorf of the State of the Teutonic Order.	
1423	Hussite Wars	Battle of Hořic	(Czech Republic)	27 April	Taborites defeat Utraquists, ending the Hussite Civil War.	
1423		Battle of L'Aquila	(Italy)	7 May 1423—5 June 1424	Jacopo Caldora and Micheletto Attendolo for the Kingdom of Naples defeat Braccio da Montone for Alfonso V of Aragon.	
1423	Hundred Years' War	Battle of Cravant	(France)	31 July	England and Burgundy defeat France and Scotland.	
1423	Hundred Years' War	Battle of La Brossinière	(France)	26 Sep	French victory over English.	
1423		Battle of Bolu	(Turkey)		Sultan Murad II of the Ottoman Empire defeats bey Mubariz al-Din Isfendiyar of the Candar dynasty.	
1424	Wars in Lombardy	Battle of Zagonara	(Italy)	28 July	The Florentines defeated by Filippo Maria Visconti's Milanese army under Count of Carmagnola.	
1424	Hundred Years' War	Battle of Verneuil	(France)	17 Aug	The English under the Duke of Bedford defeat a major Franco-Scottish army, clearing the way for further English conquests in Northern France.	
1425	Hook and Cod wars	Siege of Schoonhoven	(Netherlands)	10 March—8 Oct	A Hook army under Jacqueline, Countess of Hainaut managed to capture and hold Schoonhoven, from Cod armies, fighting for duke Philip the Good of Burgundy.	
1425	Hook and Cod wars	Battle of Alphen aan den Rijn	(Netherlands)	21 Oct	A Hook army under Jacqueline, Countess of Hainaut defeats a Cod army under Jacob van Gaasbeek.	
1426	Hook and Cod wars	Battle of Brouwershaven	(Netherlands)	13 Jan	Burgundian troops defeat combined Zeelander and English forces.	
1426	Hundred Years' War	Battle of St. James	(France)	6 March	An English force defeats the French under Arthur de Richemont.	
1426	Hook and Cod wars	Siege of Haarlem	(Netherlands)	4 April—8 May	The army of Jacqueline, Countess of Hainaut fails to take Haarlem from duke Philip the Good of Burgundy.	
1426	Hook and Cod wars	Battle of Alphen aan den Rijn	(Netherlands)	30 April	The army of Jacqueline, Countess of Hainaut defeats a Burgundian army.	
1426	Hussite Wars	Battle of Usti nad Labem	(Czech Republic)	16 June	Hussites defeat Imperial forces in the modern-day Czech Republic.	
1426	Mamluk campaigns against Cyprus	Battle of Khirokitia	(Cyprus)	7 July	Mamelukes defeat intoxicated Cypriots.	
1426	Hook and Cod wars	Battle of Hoorn	(Netherlands)	22 Aug	An army under duke Philip the Good of Burgundy defeats a Hook army.	
1426	Pre-East Frisian Liberation Wars	Battle of Detern	(Germany)	27 Sep	East Frisian rebels under chieftain Focko Ukena of Moormerland and Lengenerland and Chieftain Sibet Lubben of Rüstringen and Östringen defeat Chieftain Ocko II tom Brok of Brokmerland.	
1426	Lam Sơn uprising	Battle of Tốt Động – Chúc Động	(Vietnam)	5-7 Nov	Le Loi decisively defeats Ming dynasty.	
1426	Hook and Cod wars	Siege of Zevenbergen	(Netherlands)	Nov 1426—11 April 1427	The army of duke Philip the Good of Burgundy captures Zevenbergen.	
1427	Dano-Hanseatic War	Battle of Øresund	(Denmark) / (Sweden)	11-15 July	The navy of the Kalmar Union and Pomerania-Wolgast-Barth defeats the Hanseatic League.	
1427	Hundred Years' War	Siege of Montargis	(France)	15 July—5 Sep	French under Jean de Dunois defeat English.	
1427	Hussite Wars	Battle of Tachov	(Czech Republic)	3-4 Aug	Hussites defeat coalition forces.	
1427	Lam Sơn uprising	Battle of Chi Lăng	(Vietnam)	18 Sep	Vietnam decisively defeats Ming Chinese. China agrees to Vietnam's independence soon after.	
1427	Hook and Cod wars	Battle of Wieringen	(Netherlands)	Sep	A Burgundian fleet defeats a Hook fleet.	
1427	Wars in Lombardy	Battle of Maclodio	(Italy)	4 Oct		
1427	East Frisian Liberation Wars	Battle of the Wild Fields	(Germany)	28 Oct	Chieftain Focko Ukena of Moormerland and Lengenerland defeats chieftain Ocko II tom Brok of Brokmerland and Auricherland.	
1427	Hook and Cod wars	Siege of Amersfoort	(Netherlands)	1-8 Nov	Duke Philip the Good of Burgundy fails to take Amersfoort from the local citizens, fighting for bishop Rudolf van Diepholt of Utrecht.	
1427	Byzantine-Latin Wars	Battle of the Echinades	(Greece)		Byzantines defeat Carlo I Tocco and recapture the Latin possessions in the Peloponnese.	
1427	Vijayanagara–Gajapati wars	Battle of Kondavidu	(India)		Vijayanagara under Deva Raya II fights Eastern Gangas.	
1427		Battle of Sighnaq	(Kazakhstan)		Khan Barak Khan of the Golden Horde defeats the Timurid Empire under governor Ulugh Beg of Samarkand.	
1428	Hook and Cod wars	Siege of Gouda	(Netherlands)	May—July	Jacqueline, Countess of Hainaut capitulates to duke Philip the Good of Burgundy.	
1428	Hundred Years' War	Siege of Orléans	(France)	12 Oct 1428—8 May 1429	English forces commanded by the Earl of Suffolk besiege French city and are driven off by Joan of Arc.	
1429	Hundred Years' War	Battle of Jargeau	(France)	11–12 June	Joan of Arc captures a bridge held by English over the Loire River. Her helmet saves her from a projectile.	
1429	Hundred Years' War	Battle of Meung-sur-Loire	(France)	11–12 June	The forces of Joan of Arc capture a second Loire River bridge.	
1429	Hundred Years' War	Battle of Beaugency	(France)	16–17 June	Joan of Arc's forces capture a third Loire River bridge.	
1429	Hundred Years' War	Battle of Patay	(France)	18 June	Major French field victory over the English, recognized as the war's turning point.	
1430	Hundred Years' War	Siege of Compiègne	(France)	23 May—early Nov	French victory but Joan of Arc is captured by Burgundians.	
1431	Wars in Lombardy	Battle of Soncino	(Italy)	17 May	Count of Carmagnola, for Venice, is defeated by the Visconti.	
1431	Wars in Lombardy	Battle of Pavia	(Italy)	22 May	The Venetian fleet is destroyed by the Milanese.	
1431	Armagnac–Burgundian Civil War and Hundred Years' War	Battle of Bulgnéville	(France)	2 July	Antoine, Count of Vaudémont, Burgundy and England defeat René of Anjou and the Armagnac party of France.	
1431	Hussite Wars	Battle of Domažlice	(Czech Republic)	14 Aug	Hussite army led by Prokop the Bald slaughters Crusaders.	
1431	Scottish clan wars	Battle of Inverlochy	(Scotland)	Sep	Royal English forces routed by Scottish Highlanders.	
1431		Siege of Angkor	(Cambodia)		Thai Ayutthaya Kingdom ends Khmer Empire and sacks their capital.	
1432	Wars in Lombardy	Battle of San Romano	(Italy)	1 June	Florence fought Siena. Disputed victory for Florence.	
1432	Wars in Lombardy	Battle of Delebio	(Italy)	18-19 Nov	Duchy of Milan and Valtellina defeats the Republic of Venice.	
1432	Lithuanian Civil War (1432–1438)	Battle of Murafa	(Ukraine)	30 Nov	The Duchy of Podolia under starosta Fedir Nesvizhsky of Kremenets defeats Poland under voivode Jan Mężyk of the Ruthenian Voivodeship and voivode Wincenty Szamotulski of Szamotuły.	
1434	Hussite Wars	Battle of Lipany	(Czech Republic)	30 May	Catholic Crusaders destroy Taborite army.	
1435	Hundred Years' War	Battle of Gerbevoy	(France)	9 May	French troops, under the command of La Hire, defeat English.	
1435	Aragonese conquest of Naples	Battle of Ponza	(Italy)	5 Aug	A Genoese fleet sent by Filippo Maria Visconti defeats the Aragonese of Alfonso V of Naples.	
1435	Lithuanian Civil War	Battle of Wiłkomierz	(Lithuania)	1 Sep	The forces of Grand Duke Sigismund Kęstutaitis of Lithuania with the help of Polish troops defeated Švitrigaila and his Livonian allies.	
1435	Anglo-Scottish Border Wars	Battle of Piperdean	(Scotland)	10 Sep	Scottish victory over the English on the Scottish Borders.	
1436	Janibak al-Sufi revolt, Aq Qoyunlu–Mamluk wars	Battle of Diyarbakır	(Turkey)		Mamluks defeat Aq Qoyunlu and annex Harput.	
1437	Moroccan–Portuguese conflicts	Battle of Tangier	(Morocco)	13 Sep - 19 Oct	Vizier Abu Zakariya Yahya al-Wattasi of Morocco defeats Prince Henry the Navigator of Portugal.	
1437	First Russo-Kazan war	Battle of Belyov	(Russia)	8 Dec	Tatars defeat Moscow.	
1438	Chanka-Inca War	Siege of Cusco	(Peru)		Kingdom of Cusco repels Chanka siege of their capital city.	
1438	Chanka-Inca War	Battle of Yahuar Pampa	(Peru)		Pachacuti of Cusco defeats and conquers the Chanka chiefdom and establishes the Inca Empire.	
1439	Post-Hussite Wars	Battle of Grotniki	(Poland)	4 or 6 May	Polish army defeats Hussite Protestants.	
1439	Eric of Pomerania's War against Sweden	Siege of Älvsborg	(Sweden)	Summer	Norwegian army is forced to retreat after a 10 week long siege by a Swedish relief force	
1440	Wars in Lombardy	Battle of Anghiari	(Italy)	29 June	Niccolò Piccinino, overlord of Bologna, defeats Milanese Filippo Maria Visconti and is then opposed by Cosimo de Medici.	
1440	Serbian–Ottoman Wars	Siege of Novo Brdo	(Kosovo)	Oct 1440—27 June 1441	Ottoman forces captured Novo Brdo, an important fortified mining town of Serbia.	
1440-1441		Battle of Mazandaran	(Iran)		Uzbek raiders defeat the Tumen emirs Haji Yusuf Jalil and Sheikh Haji of the Timurid Empire.	
1442	Hungarian–Ottoman Wars	Battle of the Ialomița	(Romania)	2 September	The Battle of the Ialomița was fought between the army of the Kingdom of Hungary and the Ottoman Empire in 1442, John Hunyadi defeated the army of Provincial Governor of Rumelia, Beylerbey Şehabeddin at the Ialomița River.	
1443	Old Zürich War	Battle of Freienbach	(Switzerland)	22 May	Switzerland under Ital Reding the Elder, Landammann of Schwyz defeats a German Habsburg Imperial army, Zürich and Rapperswil under Habsburg commander Albrecht von Landenberg.	
1443	Old Zürich War	Battle of Hirzel	(Switzerland)	24 May	Switzerland defeats Zürich and a German Habsburg Imperial army.	
1443	Old Zürich War	Battle of St. Jakob an der Sihl	(Switzerland)	22 July	Switzerland defeats Zürich and a German Habsburg Imperial army under Rudolf Stüssi, mayor of Zürich.	
1443	Crusade of Varna	Battle of Niš	(Serbia)	Early Nov	John Hunyadi defeated three Ottoman armies before retreating.	
1443	Crusade of Varna	Battle of Zlatica	(Bulgaria)	12 Dec	Crusader advance stopped by the Ottoman army.	
1444	Crusade of Varna	Battle of Kunovica	(Serbia)	2 or 5 Jan	Hungary, Poland, and Serbia defeated Ottoman forces.	
1444	Albanian–Ottoman Wars	Battle of Torvioll	(Albania)	29 June	Albanians under Skanderbeg defeat Ottomans.	
1444		Siege of Rhodes	(Greece)	10 Aug—18 Sep	Knights Hospitaller defeats Mamluk Sultanate.	
1444	Old Zürich War	Battle of St. Jakob an der Birs	(Switzerland)	26 Aug	French defeat Swiss.	
1444	War of the Guelderian Succession	Battle of Linnich	(Germany)	3 Nov	The army of Gerhard VII, Duke of Jülich-Berg defeats the army of Arnold, Duke of Guelders.	
1444	Crusade of Varna	Battle of Varna	(Bulgaria)	10 Nov	Ottoman Sultan Murad II defeats Hungarians, Poles, and Wallachians, King Władysław III of Poland killed.	
1445	Castilian Civil War of 1437–1445	First Battle of Olmedo	(Spain)	19 May	King John II of Castile defeats Aragon, king John II of Navarre and Castilian rebels.	
1445	Old Zürich War	Battle of Wolfhalden	(Switzerland)	11 June	The Swiss of Appenzell defeat king Frederick III of Germany.	
1445	Albanian–Ottoman Wars	Battle of Mokra	(North Macedonia)	10 Oct	Albanians under Skanderbeg defeat Ottomans.	
1445	Old Zürich War	Battle of Männedorf	(Switzerland)	29 Oct	The navy of Zürich under William, Margrave of Hachberg-Sausenberg defeats the Swiss of Schwyz.	
1445		Battle of Gomit	(Ethiopia)	25 Dec	Emperor Zara Yaqob of Ethiopia defeats and kills Sultan Arwe Badlay of Adal.	
1446	Old Zürich War	Battle of Ragaz	(Switzerland)	6 March	Switzerland under Landammann Jost Tschüdi the Elder of Glarus and Landammann Ital Reding the Younger of Schwyz defeat a German Imperial army under commander knight Hans von Rechberg.	
1446	Albanian–Ottoman Wars	Battle of Otonetë	(North Macedonia)	22 Sep	Skanderbeg defeats Ottomans.	
1446	Siege of Baghdad	(Iraq)	9 June	Jahan Shah captures Baghdad.		
1446	1447	Timurid Civil Wars	Battle of Damghan	(Iran)		Abdal-Latif Mirza captures Damghan.
1448	Albanian–Ottoman Wars	Siege of Svetigrad	(North Macedonia)	14 May—31 July	Ottomans under Murad II capture Albanian fortress.	
1448	Wars in Lombardy and Milanese War of Succession	Battle of Caravaggio	(Italy)	15 Sep	Ambrosian Republic (Milan's short-lived republic) fights the Republic of Venice.	
1448	Hungarian–Ottoman Wars and Ottoman–Wallachian wars	Battle of Kosovo	(Kosovo)	17-20 Oct	Roman Catholic coalition defeated by Ottoman Turkish forces.	
1448	Anglo-Scottish Wars	Battle of Sark	(Scotland)	23 Oct	Also known as Battle of Lochmabenstone – Anglo-Scottish conflicts.	
1448	Reconquista	Battle of Hellín	(Spain)	Dec	Sultan Muhammad IX of Granada defeats Castile under Alfonso Téllez-Girón, 1st Count of Ureña.	
1449		Battle of Alfarrobeira	(Portugal)	20 May	Afonso V of Portugal defeats rebels of Pedro, Duke of Coimbra.	
1449		Battle of Tumu Fortress	(China)	1 Sep	Conflict between the Mongols and the Chinese Ming Dynasty. Mongol victory.	
1449	War of the Cities	Battle of Waldstetten	(Germany)	1 Sep	Ulrich V, Count of Württemberg defeats the imperial free city of Schwäbisch Gmünd.	
c. 1450		Battle of the Reef of Niutao	(Tuvalu)		Natives of the Polynesian island of Niutao defeat attempted invasion by Tuʻi Tonga Empire.	
1450	Hundred Years' War	Battle of Formigny	(France)	15 April	Decisive French victory over English.	
1450	Albanian–Ottoman Wars	Siege of Krujë	(Albania)	14 May—23 Nov	Skanderbeg defends Albanian town from an army of around 100,000 men led by Murad I.	
1450		Battle of the Five Forts	(New Zealand)		Māori Ngāti Hotu tribe decisively defeated by the Whanganui Māori tribe.	

== Late 15th century (1451–1500) ==
Year	War	Battle	Loc.	Date(s)	Description
1451	Navarrese Civil War (1451–1455)	Battle of Aibar	(Spain)	25 Oct	King John II of Navarre defeats Charles, Prince of Viana.
1452	Reconquista	Battle of Los Alporchones	(Spain)	17 Mar	King John II of Castile defeats sultan Muhammad IX of Granada.
1452	Ghent War	Battle of Nevele	(Belgium)	25 May	A Burgundian army under John of Burgundy defeats a rebel army of Ghent.
1452	Ghent War	Battle of Bazel	(Belgium)	16 June	A Burgundian army under duke Philip the Good defeats a rebel army of Ghent under Wouter Leenknecht.
1452		Battle of Rafal Garcés	(Spain)	31 Aug	Aragon, under Francesc d'Erill i de Centelles defeats Forana rebels, commanded by Jaume Nicolau on the island of Mallorca.
1453	Byzantine–Ottoman wars	Battle of Constantinople	(Turkey)	6 April—29 May	Mehmet II of the Ottoman Turks captures Constantinople (Istanbul), ending the Byzantine Empire.
1453	Albanian–Ottoman Wars	Battle of Polog	(North Macedonia)	22 April	Skanderbeg defeats Ottomans.
1453	Hundred Years' War	Battle of Castillon	(France)	17 July	The Valois use cannon to defeat the Lancastrians, which ends the Hundred Years' War.
1453	Ghent War	Battle of Gavere	(Belgium)	23 July	A Burgundian army under duke Philip the Good defeats a rebel army of Ghent.
1454	Münster Diocesan Feud	Battle of Varlar	(Germany)	18 July	The Archbishopric of Cologne, Bishopric of Utrecht, County of Bentheim-Steinfurt and the County of Lippe fighting for Walram von Moers defeat the Duchy of Brunswick-Lüneburg and allies fighting for Erich von Hoya in the Münster Diocesan Feud.
1454	Thirteen Years' War	Battle of Chojnice	(Poland)	18 Sep	Polish defeated by Teutonic Knights.
1454	Serbian–Ottoman Wars	Battle of Leskovac	(Serbia)	24 Sep	Serbs under command of Nikola Skobaljić defeat a larger Ottoman army.
1454	Serbian–Ottoman Wars	Battle of Kruševac	(Serbia)	2 Oct	Serbian Despotate, allied with the Kingdom of Hungary, defeats invading Ottoman forces.
1454		Capture of Kondavidu	(India)		Hamvira Deva of the Gajapati Empire captures Kondavidu Fort, defeating both the Reddis and the Vijayanagara.
1455	Clan Douglas and Stewart royal family feud	Battle of Arkinholm	(Scotland)	1 May	Scottish Royal-Black Douglas civil war.
1455	Wars of the Roses	First Battle of St Albans	(England)	22 May	First battle of the English Wars of the Roses, a victory for the pretender Richard of York.
1455	Albanian–Ottoman Wars	Siege of Berat	(Albania)	July	Ottomans defeat Albanians under Skanderbeg.
1456	Hungarian–Ottoman Wars and Serbian–Ottoman Wars	Siege of Belgrade	(Serbia)	4–22 July	Hungarian forces lift Ottoman siege, Sultan Mehmet II wounded.
1456	Hook and Cod wars	Siege of Deventer	(Netherlands)	14 Aug—15 Sep	Duke Philip the Good of Burgundy captures Deventer in order to make his son David of Burgundy bishop of Utrecht during the Utrecht war.
1456	Siamese invasions of Malacca	Battle of Batu Pahat	(Malaysia)		Naval battle where the Malacca Sultanate defeated the Ayutthaya Kingdom.
1457		Battle of Direptatea	(Moldova)	April	Ştefan cel Mare, helped by Wallachian prince Vlad III the Impaler, defeated Petru Aron and became Voivod of Moldavia.
1457	Colonisation of Hokkaido	Koshamain's War	(Japan)		Koshamain and his followers sacked the Twelve Garrisons of Southern Hokkaido, before being overcome by Takeda Nobuhiro's forces.
1458	Bahmani-Gajapati conflicts	Battle of Devarakonda	(India)		Gajapati defeats a larger army of the Bahmani Sultanate.
1459	Wars of the Roses	Battle of Blore Heath	(England)	23 Sep	Yorkist knights defeat Lancastrians.
1459	Wars of the Roses	Battle of Ludford Bridge	(England)	12 Oct	King Henry routs Yorkists.
1459		Siege of Venlo	(Netherlands)		Adolf of Guelders surrenders to his father Arnold, Duke of Guelders, ending a rebellion.
1460	War of Roses	Battle of Sandwich	(England)	15 Jan	Yorkists land at Sandwich, rout Lancastrians.
1460	War of Neapolitan Succession	Battle of Nola	(Italy)	7 July	John of Anjou's victory over Ferdinand of Naples.
1460	War of Roses	Battle of Northampton	(England)	10 July	Warwick attacks royal camp and captures King Henry.
1460	War of Roses	Battle of Wakefield	(England)	30 Dec	Queen Margaret's Lancastrians defeat Duke of York, who is killed in the fight.
1461	War of Roses	Battle of Mortimer's Cross	(England)	2 Feb	Yorkists defeat Lancastrians in the west.
1461	War of Roses	Second Battle of St Albans	(England)	17 Feb	Lancastrians storm the town, chase out Yorkists.
1461	War of Roses	Battle of Ferrybridge	(England)	28 March	Lancastrians ambush the Earl of Warwick and kill his second-in-command.
1461	War of Roses	Battle of Towton	(England)	29 March	Edward IV of England defeats Lancastrian forces.
1461		Battle of Genoa	(Italy)	17 Jul	Doge Prospero Adorno of Genoa and commander Marco Pio of the Duchy of Milan defeat duke René of Anjou, commander for France.
1461	Byzantine–Ottoman Wars	Siege of Trebizond	(Turkey)	15 Aug	Ottoman Turks led by Mehmet II capture the capitol of the Empire of Trebizond, ending that empire.
1462	Ottoman–Wallachian wars	The Night Attack	(Romania)	17 June	Vlad III Dracula attacks Mehmet II.
1462	Bavarian War	Battle of Seckenheim	(Germany)	30 June	The Electoral Palatinate and the Electorate of Mainz defeat the Margraviate of Baden, the County of Württemberg, Palatine Zweibrücken and the Bishopric of Metz.
1462	Conspiracy of the Barons	Battle of Troia	(Italy)	18 Aug	King Ferdinand I of Naples defeats John II, Duke of Lorraine.
1462	Thirteen Years' War	Battle of Świecino	(Poland)	7 Sep	Poles defeat the Teutonic Order.
1462	Expansion of the Ottoman Empire	Siege of Mytilene	(Greece)	Sep	Ottoman Turks capture the capitol of Gattilusi Lesbos.
1463	Georgian civil war	Battle of Chikhori	(Georgia (country))	Aug	George VIII of Georgia is decisively defeated by nobles led by his Royal kinsmen Bagrat.
1463	Thirteen Years' War	Battle of Zatoka Świeża	(Poland)	15 Sep	Polish navy defeats Teutonic navy.
1463	Donia War	Battle of Aalsum	(Netherlands)	11 Oct	The army of Jancko Douwema defeats the army of the Donias. A feud in Frisia.
1463	Bosnian–Ottoman Wars	Battle of Ključ	(Bosnia and Herzegovina)		Pitched battle between Ottomans and Bosnians resulting in an Ottoman victory.
1464	Wars of the Roses	Battle of Hedgeley Moor	(England)	25 April	Lancastrian defeat Yorkist forces.
1464	Wars of the Roses	Battle of Hexham	(England)	15 May	Yorkists under Montagu annihilate Lancastrians in a surprise attack.
1464	Albanian–Ottoman Wars	Battle of Ohrid	(North Macedonia)	15 Sep	Albanians and Venetians defeat Ottomans.
1464		Siege of Mandaran	(India)		Bengal Sultanate retakes Mandaran Fort from Gajapati Kingdom.
1465	Catalan Civil War	Battle of Calaf	(Spain)	28 Feb	King John II of Aragon defeats the Generalitat de Catalunya, commanded by Peter, Constable of Portugal.
1465	Albanian–Ottoman Wars	Battle of Vaikal	(North Macedonia)	April	Albanian rebels under Skanderbeg defeat Ottomans.
1465	Albanian–Ottoman Wars	Battle of Meçad	(North Macedonia)	June	Skanderbeg defeats Ottomans under Ballaban Badera.
1465	War of the Public Weal	Battle of Montlhéry	(France)	16 July	Troops of King Louis XI of France fight inconclusively against an army of great nobles.
1465	First Liège War	Battle of Montenaken	(Belgium)	20 Oct	The Burgundian army under Charles the Bold defeats the army of the Prince-Bishopric of Liège.
1466	Albanian–Ottoman Wars	Siege of Krujë	(Albania)	June 1466—23 April 1467	Albanians under Skanderbeg repel siege by Sultan Mehmet II.
1466	First Liège War	Siege of Dinant	(Belgium)	18-29 Aug	The Burgundian army under Charles the Bold captures and destroys Dinant.
1467		Battle of Molinella	(Italy)	25 July	Bartolomeo Colleoni for Venice is defeated.
1467		Second Battle of Olmedo	(Spain)	20 Aug	King Henry IV of Castile defeats Alfonso, Prince of Asturias.
1467	Albanian–Ottoman Wars	Siege of Krujë	(Albania)	Summer	Skanderbeg repels another siege by Mehmet II.
1467	Second Liège War	Battle of Brustem	(Belgium)	28 Oct	The Burgundian army under Charles the Bold defeats the army of the Prince-Bishopric of Liège.
1467	Qara Qoyunlu-Aq Qoyunlu wars	Battle of Chapakchur	(Turkey)	October 30 or November 11	Aq Qoyunlu defeat and annex Qara Qoyunlu and kill Jahan Shah.
1467		Battle of Baia	(Romania)	15 Dec	Prince Ştefan cel Mare of Moldavia defeated king Mathias Corvinus of Hungary.
1468	War in Guelders	Battle of Straelen	(Germany)	26 June	An army of Adolf, Duke of Guelders defeats the army of John I, Duke of Cleves.
1469		Battle of Qarabagh	(Azerbaijan)	4 February	Aq Qoyunlu defeats Timurids of Samarkand and secures control over Azerbaijan.
1469	Bohemian–Hungarian War (1468–1478)	Battle of Vilémov	(Czech Republic)	26 Feb	George of Poděbrady, king of Bohemia, defeats king Matthias Corvinus of Hungary.
1469	Wars of the Roses	Battle of Edgecote Moor	(England)	26 July	Warwick the Kingmaker triumphs over Edward IV.
1470	Wars of the Roses	Battle of Lose-coat Field	(England)	12 March	Yorkists chase disrobing Lancastrians from the field.
1470	First Ottoman–Venetian War	Siege of Negroponte	(Greece)	14 June—12 July	Ottomans besiege and capture the Venetian fortress of Negroponte.
1470		Battle of Lipnic	(Moldova)	20 Aug	Prince Ştefan cel Mare of Moldavia defeats khan Ahmed Khan bin Küchük of the Great Horde.
1470	Muisca Confederation wars	Battle of Pasca	(Colombia)		Southern Muisca Confederation defeats alliance of the Sutagao and Panche.
1471	Champa–Đại Việt War	Siege of Vijaya	(Vietnam)	24 Feb—22 March	Đại Việt captures Vijaya, the capital of Champa.
1471	War of Roses	Battle of Ravenspur	(England)	14 March	Edward IV lands at Ravenspur and repulses token resistance.
1471	War of Roses	Battle of Barnet	(England)	14 April	Confusion in the fog, Earl of Warwick killed.
1471	War of Roses	Battle of Tewkesbury	(England)	4 May	Edward IV of England's final victory over the House of Lancaster.
1471	Muscovite-Novgorodian Wars	Battle of Shelon	(Russia)	14 July	Ivan the Great of Russia decisively defeats the Novgorod Republic, which is gradually absorbed by Muscovy.
1471	Moroccan–Portuguese conflicts	Battle of Asilah	(Morocco)	24 Aug	Portugal conquers Asilah from the Wattasids.
1471	Dano-Swedish War	Battle of Brunkeberg	(Sweden)	10 Oct	Denmark fights Sweden.
1472		Siege of Nesle	(France)	14 June	The army of duke Charles the Bold of Burgundy captures Nesle from France. The population is massacred.
1472		Siege of Beauvais	(France)		The army of duke Charles the Bold of Burgundy fails to captures Beauvais from France.
1473	Campaigns of Uzun Hassa	Battle of Otlukbeli	(Turkey)	11 Aug	Mehmet II of Ottoman Turks decisively defeats Uzun Hasan of Akkoyunlu Turkomans.
1473		Battle of Tlatelolco	(Mexico)		Aztec Empire defeats Tlatelolco.
1474	Burgundian Wars	Siege of Neuss	(Germany)	29 July 1474—27 June 1475	Charles the Bold leads unsuccessful siege.
1474	Burgundian Wars	Battle of Héricourt	(France)	13-14 Nov	Burgundy is defeated by the Swiss Confederation.
1474	First Ottoman–Venetian War	Siege of Shkodra	(Albania)	Spring—8 Aug	Venice and Zeta (Montenegro) defeat Ottoman besiegers.
1475	Moldavian–Ottoman Wars, Hungarian–Ottoman Wars and Polish-Ottoman Wars	Battle of Vaslui	(Romania)	10 Jan	Ştefan cel Mare defeats a huge Ottoman army.
1475	Burgundian Wars	Battle on the Planta	(Switzerland)	Nov	Switzerland defeats Savoy.
1475	War of the Castilian Succession	Siege of Burgos	(Spain)	1475—early 1476	Supporters of Joanna are driven out of the Castle of Burgos.
1476	War of the Castilian Succession	Battle of Toro	(Spain)	1 March	Indecisive: Prince John of Portugal defeated the Castilian right wing and remained in possession of the battlefield while his father Afonso V is defeated by the Castilian left-centre led by the Duke of Alba and Cardinal Mendoza. Both sides claimed victory.
1476	Burgundian Wars	Battle of Grandson	(Switzerland)	2 March	A Swiss army defeats the Burgundians under Charles the Bold.
1476	Burgundian Wars	Battle of Morat	(Switzerland)	22 June	The Swiss defeat Charles the Bold again.
1476	Moldavian–Ottoman Wars	Battle of Valea Albă	(Romania)	26 July	Mehmed II defeats Ştefan cel Mare.
1476	Turkoman invasions of Georgia	Siege of Tbilisi	(Georgia (country))		Georgia successfully repels Aq Qoyunlu invasion of their capital.
1477	War of the Burgundian Succession	Battle of Nancy	(France)	5 Jan	Swiss pikemen defeat cavalry of Burgundy's Charles the Bold, who is killed.
1477	Ottoman–Venetian War and Albanian–Ottoman Wars	Siege of Krujë	(Albania)	Spring 1477—June 1478	Ottomans under Mehmet II capture Krujë from the League of Lezhë.
1477	War of the Burgundian Succession	Battle of Émagny Bridge	(France)	25 June	France under Georges II de La Trémoille defeats Burgundy under Hugues III de Chalon-Arlay in an attempt to control the County of Burgundy.
1477	War of the Burgundian Succession	Siege of Dole	(France)	End of July—7 Oct	France fails to capture Dole from Burgundy. The French army is destroyed and has to leave the County of Burgundy.
1478	Aragonese conquest of Sardinia	Battle of Macomer	(Italy)	19 May	Sardinian rebels are defeated by the Aragonese.
1478	Ottoman–Venetian War and Albanian–Ottoman Wars	Siege of Shkodra	(Albania)	May 1478—25 April 1479	Ottomans take Shkodër.
1478	War of the Castilian Succession	Battle of Guinea	(Ghana)	Spring or summer	Castilian fleet is defeated and captured by the Portuguese.
1478		Battle of Khoy	(Iran)	14 August	Sultan Yaqub defeats his brother Sultan Khalil to secure his spot on the Aq Qoyunlu throne.
1478	Transalpine campaigns of the Old Swiss Confederacy	Battle of Giornico	(Switzerland)	28 Dec	Switzerland defeats the Duchy of Milan.
1478	Islamization of Indonesia	Battle of Trowulan	(Indonesia)	1478—1527	Majapahit rebels backed by the Demak Sultanate are defeated by Girindrawardhana.
1479	War of the Burgundian Succession	Battle of Guinegate	(France)	7 Aug	French troops are defeated by the Burgundians led by Maximilian of Habsburg.
1479		Battle of Poggio Imperiale	(Italy)	7 Sep	The Kingdom of Naples, the Republic of Siena and the Papal States under duke Alfonso of Calabria defeat the Republic of Florence and France under condottiero Galeotto I Pico.
1479	Vietnamese-Laotian War	Battle of the Plain of Jars	(Laos)	Fall	Đại Việt decisively defeats Lan Xang.
1479	Hungarian–Ottoman Wars	Battle of Breadfield	(Romania)	13 Oct	Pál Kinizsi, comite of Timișoara, defeated the Ottomans.
1480	Ottoman wars in Europe	Siege of Rhodes	(Greece)	May—28 July	Ottomans unsuccessfully besiege the Knights Hospitaller garrison on Rhodes.
1480	Hungarian–Ottoman Wars	Battle of Otranto	(Italy)	28 July 1840—10 Sep 1841	Gedik Ahmed Pasha of the Ottoman Turks captures Otranto in the Italian peninsula.
1480		Battle of Urfa	(Turkey)	August	Aq Qoyunlu repels attempted invasion by the Mamluks.
1480	Golden Horde conflicts	Great Stand on the Ugra River	(Russia)	8 Oct—28 Nov	Ivan the Great makes army of the Golden Horde retreat without bloodshed. End of vassalage of the Russian states to Golden Horde.
1480	Scottish clan wars	Battle of Skibo and Strathfleet	(Scotland)		Clan Sutherland and Murrays of Aberscross defeat Clan Donald.
1480	Clan MacDonald internal conflicts	Battle of Bloody Bay	(Scotland)		A naval battle fought near Tobermory, Scotland, between John of Islay, Earl of Ross, the Lord of the Isles and chief of Clan Donald; and his son, Angus Óg Macdonald.
1480	MacDonald-Mackenzie feud	Battle of Lagabraad	(Scotland)		Clan Donald defeats Clan Mackenzie.
1480	Vietnamese-Laotian War	Battle of Pāk Phūn	(Laos)		Lan Xang decisively defeats exhausted Viet army.
1481	Hook and Cod wars	Siege of Leiden	(Netherlands)	30 March—14 April	The Burgundian army under duke Maximilian captures rebel Leiden.
1481		Battle of Yenişehir	(Turkey)	22 June	The forces of Sultan Beyazit II of Ottoman Turks defeat the supporters of his brother and rival, Cem Sultan.
1481	Moldavian–Ottoman Wars	Battle of Râmnic	(Romania)	22 Jul	Prince Stephen the Great of Moldavia defeats prince Basarab the Young of Wallachia.
1481	Hook and Cod wars	Battle of Scherpenzeel	(Netherlands)	22 or 23 Sep	An army of the Prince-Bishopric of Utrecht in coalition with Burgundy defeats a rebel army.
1481	Hook and Cod wars	Battle of Vreeswijk	(Netherlands)	13 Oct	A rebel army under Jan III van Montfoort defeats an army of the Prince-Bishopric of Utrecht in coalition with Burgundy under governor Joost de Lalaing of Holland and Zeeland.
1481	Hook and Cod wars	Battle of Westbroek	(Netherlands)	13 Oct	An army of the Prince-Bishopric of Utrecht in coalition with Burgundy defeats a rebel army.
1482	War of Ferrara	Battle of Campomorto	(Italy)	21 Aug	Papal army under Roberto Malatesta defeats Neapolitan troops led by Alfonso, Duke of Calabria.
1482	Hook and Cod wars	Siege of IJsselstein	(Netherlands)	26 Aug—16 Sep	A rebel army from the Prince-Bishopric of Utrecht fails to capture Habsburg IJsselstein.
1483	Hook and Cod wars and Second Utrecht Civil War	Siege of Utrecht	(Netherlands)	23 June—31 Aug	A Habsburg army under regent Maximilian captures Utrecht.
1483	Hundred Years' Croatian–Ottoman War	Battle of Una	(Croatia)	29-30 Oct	Croatian army defeats forces of the invading Ottoman Empire.
1484	Austrian–Hungarian War (1477–1488)	Battle of Leitzersdorf	(Austria)	11 May	Hungary defeats an imperial German army.
1484	Clan Douglas and Stewart royal family feud	Battle of Lochmaben Fair	(Scotland)	22 July	Scottish Royal-Black Douglas civil war. Scottish royalists defeats Scottish rebels.
1485	Austrian-Hungarian War	Siege of Vienna	(Austria)	29 Jan—1 June	Decisive victory for Hungary over the Holy Roman Empire in the Austrian–Hungarian War (1477–1488).
1485	Ottoman–Mamluk War	First Battle of Adana	(Turkey)	9 Feb	Mamluks rout Ottoman army.
1485	Ottoman–Mamluk War	Second Battle of Adana	(Turkey)	15 March	Mamluks decisively defeat Ottomans, capturing their commander Hersek-Oglu.
1485		Sack of Fayium	(Egypt)		Hawwara tribe sack the city of Faiyum and solidate their position as the rulers of Upper Egypt
1485	Wars of the Roses	Battle of Bosworth Field	(England)	22 Aug	Richard III defeated by Henry Tudor, who becomes Henry VII of England. This battle marked the end of the Wars of the Roses and the beginning of the Tudor period in England.
1487	Wars of the Roses	Battle of Stoke	(England)	16 June	Henry VII of England finally defeats internal opposition.
1487	Scottish clan wars	Battle of Auldicharish	(United Kingdom)	11 July	Scottish clan battle
1487		Battle of Calliano	(Italy)	10 Aug	The Prince-Bishopric of Trent and the County of Tyrol defeat Venice.
1487	Polish–Ottoman War	Battle of Kopystrzyń	(Ukraine)	8 Sep	Polish under John I Albert decisively defeat the Tatars.
1487		Battle of Magari	(Japan)		Daimyo Rokkaku Takayori, helped by ninja from the Iga Confederacy and Kōka Confederacy, defeats Shogun Ashikaga Yoshihisa.
1488	Clan Cunningham – Clan Montgomery feud and Second rebellion against James III	Battle of Sauchieburn	(Scotland)	11 June	King James III defeated by Scottish nobles.
1488	Mad War	Battle of Saint-Aubin-du-Cormier	(France)	28 July	French commander Louis II de la Trémoille defeats rebel Brittany under Jean IV de Rieux. Brittany was supported by Germany, England and Castile.
1488	First Ottoman–Mamluk War	Battle of Aga-Cayiri	(Turkey)		Mamluks defeat Ottomans.
1488		Battle of Tabasaran	(Dagestan) (Russia)		Shirvanshahs and Ak Koyunlu defeat and kill Shaykh Haydar of the Safavid order.
1489	Hook and Cod wars and Squire Francis War	Battle on the Lek	(Netherlands)	4 June	A Habsburg fleet defeats a rebel fleet.
1490	Hook and Cod wars and Squire Francis War	Siege of Montfoort	(Netherlands)	2 May—8 Aug	A Habsburg army under Albert III, Duke of Saxony captures rebel Montfoort.
1490	Hook and Cod wars and Squire Francis War	Battle of Moordrecht	(Netherlands)	18 June	A Habsburg army defeats a rebel army.
1490		Battle of Bonefield	(Hungary)	4 Jul	Stephen V Báthory, Voivode of Transylvania and count Pál Kinizsi of Temes County, fighting for Beatrice of Naples, former queen of Hungary, defeat John Corvinus.
1490	Hook and Cod wars and Squire Francis War	Battle of Brouwershaven	(Netherlands)	23 July	A Habsburg fleet defeats a rebel fleet.
1490	Muisca Confederation wars	Battle of Chocontá	(Colombia)		The Southern Muisca defeat the Northern Muisca, though both leaders die in the battle.
1491	Hundred Years' Croatian–Ottoman War	Battle of Vrpile	(Croatia)	Early Sep	Forces of the Kingdom of Croatia defeat Ottoman Turks.
1492	Reconquista	Battle of Granada	(Spain)	2 Jan	Ferdinand II of Aragon defeats the last Muslim kingdom in al-Andalus, the Emirate of Granada of Sultan Boabdil.
1493		Battle of Anfao	(Mali)	12 April	Rebel General Muhammad Askia gains rulership of the Songhai Empire after defeating the forces of Sonni Baru, ending the Sonni dynasty.
1493	Hundred Years' Croatian-Ottoman War	Battle of Krbava field	(Croatia)	9 Sep	Ottoman Turks defeat Croatians.
1493	Mapuche-Inca War	Battle of the Maule	(Chile)		Inca Empire under Emperor Túpac Yupanqui fights coalition led by the Mapuche with a disputed outcome.
1493	Voyages of Christopher Columbus	Battle of La Navidad	(Haiti)		The Taino chieftain Caonabo razes Spanish fort La Navidad in Haiti and kills the Spanish garrison of 39 Spaniards.
1494	Spanish Conquest of the Canary Islands	First Battle of Acentejo	(Spain)	31 May	Guanches defeat Spaniards on island of Tenerife.
1494	First Italian War	Battle of Rapallo	(Italy)	5 Sep	France, Milan and Genoa defeat Naples.
1494	Spanish Conquest of the Canary Islands	Battle of Aguere	(Spain)	14-15 Nov	Spanish defeat Guanches.
1494	Spanish Conquest of the Canary Islands	Second Battle of Acentejo	(Spain)	25 Dec	Spanish decisively defeat Guanches and annex the Canary Islands.
1495		Battle of Vega Real	(Dominican Republic)	24 March	Christopher Columbus leading a Spanish army along with their allies in the tribe of Marién defeats the other Hispaniolan chiefdoms, suppressing the Hispaniolan rebellion and capturing their leader Caonabo.
1495	First Italian War	Battle of Rapallo	(Italy)	2 May	Genoa defeats France.
1495	First Italian War	Battle of Seminara	(Italy)	28 June	France defeats Spain and Naples.
1495	First Italian War	Battle of Fornovo	(Italy)	6 July	Francesco II Gonzaga of the Italian Holy League fights against Charles VIII of France. French victory.
1497	Polish–Ottoman War	Battle of Codrii Cosminului	(Ukraine)	26 Oct	Prince Ştefan cel Mare of Moldavia defeated king John I of Poland.
1497	Timurid–Uzbek wars	Siege of Samarkand	(Uzbekistan)	May—Nov	Babur of the Timurids takes city from Muhammad Shaybani.
1497	Rebellion of Domhnall Dubh	Battle of Drumchatt	(Scotland)		Scottish clan battle. Royalists of Clan Mackenzie and Clan Munro under chieftain Hector Roy Mackenzie defeat rebel Alexander MacDonald of the Clan MacDonald of Lochalsh, supporting John of Islay, Earl of Ross.
1499	Swabian War	Battle of Hard	(Austria)	20 Feb	Switzerland defeats king Maximilian I of Germany and the Swabian League.
1499	Swabian War	Battle of Schwaderloh	(Switzerland)	11 April	Switzerland defeats the Swabian League.
1499	Swabian War	Battle of Frastanz	(Austria)	20 April	Switzerland defeats king Maximilian I of Germany and the Swabian League.
1499	Swabian War	Battle of Calven	(Switzerland)	22 May	The Three Leagues defeat king Maximilian I of Germany and the Swabian League.
1499	Swabian War	Battle of Dornach	(Switzerland)	22 July	Switzerland defeats king Maximilian I of Germany and the Swabian League.
1499	Ottoman–Venetian War	Battle of Zonchio	(Greece)	25 Aug	the Ottoman fleet defeats the Venetian fleet. Also called the Battle of Sapienza or the First Battle of Lepanto.
1500		Battle of Hemmingstedt	(Germany)	17 Feb	A peasant rebellion defeats a much larger ducal army by opening dykes and drowning them.
1500	Second Italian War	Battle of Novara	(Italy)	8–10 April	France defeats Milan
1500	Muscovite–Lithuanian Wars	Battle of Vedrosha	(Russia)	14 July	Russians beat the Lithuanians.
1500	Safavid conquest of Shirvan	Battle of Jabani	(Azerbaijan)	December	Safavid order under Ismail I decisively defeats the Shirvanshahs and kills their King Farrukh Yasar.
1500	Ottoman–Venetian War	Battle of Lepanto	(Greece)		Ottoman fleet defeats Venetian fleet.

== Early 16th century (1501–50) ==
Year	War	Battle	Loc.	Date(s)	Description
1501	Safavid–Aq Qoyunlu Wars	Battle of Sharur	(Azerbaijan)	17 July	Safavid Iran defeats Aq Qoyunlu
1501	Safavid–Aq Qoyunlu Wars	Siege of Tabriz	(Iran)		Safavids take Tabriz from the Aq Qoyunlu.
1501	Portuguese Colonial Campaigns	Battle of Mers-el-Kébir	(Algeria)	Late Jul	Sultan Abu Abdallah IV of the Kingdom of Tlemcen defeats Portugal under John of Meneses, 1st Count of Tarouca.
1501	First Luso-Malabarese War	First Battle of Cannanore	(India)	31 Dec 1501—2 Jan 1502	Portugal wins a naval battle against forces from Calicut.
1501	Campaigns of Babur	Siege of Samarkand	(Uzbekistan)		Babur loses Samarkand for the final time to the Uzbeks.
1502	Moldavian–Horde Wars	Battle of the Samara River	(Ukraine)	Jun	Moldavia and the Crimean Khanate defeat the Great Horde.
1503	First Luso-Malabarese War	Battle of Calicut	(India)	5-6 Jan	Portuguese under Vasco da Gama take city of Calicut.
1503	Safavid–Aq Qoyunlu Wars	Battle of Hamadan	(Iran)	21 June	Safavids annex western Iran from the Aq Qoyunlu.
1503	Second Italian War	Battle of Ruvo	(Italy)	23 Feb	Spain defeats France.
1503	Second Italian War	Battle of Cerignola	(Italy)	21 April	Spain defeats France.
1503	Second Italian War	Battle of Garigliano	(Italy)	27 Dec	Spain defeats France.
1503	Flower war	Battle of Atlixco	(Mexico)		Huejotzingo Pyrrhic victory
1504	Portuguese colonial campaigns	Battle of Cochin	(India)	16 March—3 July	Portuguese fend off attack from larger army led by the Zamorin of Calicut.
1504	War of the Succession of Landshut	Battle of Wenzenbach	(Germany)	12 Sep	King Maximilian I of Germany defeats king Vladislaus II of Hungary and Bohemia.
1504	Campaigns of Babur	Siege of Kabul	(Afghanistan)	Oct	Babur defeats Arghun dynasty.
1504		Battle of Pandarane	(India)	Autumn	The Portuguese navy under Lopo Soares de Albergaria defeats the Mamluk Sultanate.
1505	Portuguese colonial campaigns	Sack of Kilwa	(Tanzania)	24 July	With 8 ships and 500 soldiers, Portuguese conquer harbor capital of the Kilwa Sultanate.
1505	Portuguese colonial campaigns	Battle of Mombasa	(Kenya)	15 Aug	Portugal under Francisco de Almeida sacks Mombasa.
1506	First Luso-Malabarese War	Battle of Cannanore	(India)	March	The Portuguese defeat an Indian fleet.
1506		Battle of Mbanza Kongo	(Angola)		Catholic Kongolese King Afonso I defeats his animist half-brother Mpanzu a Kitima for control of his throne.
1507	Somali–Portuguese conflicts	Battle of Barawa	(Somalia)	April	Portuguese defeat Ajuran Sultanate, sack city but don't hold it.
1507	First Luso-Malabarese War	Siege of Cannanore	(India)	April—Aug	Portugal successfully defends Kannur.
1507	Portuguese–Safavid wars	Battle of Ormuz	(Iran)	Oct	Portugal captures Ormuz.
1507		Battle of Mers-el-Kébir	(Algeria)		Sultan Abu Abdallah V of Tlemcen defeats Spain.
1507		Battle of Socotra	(Yemen)		Portugal under Tristão da Cunha captures Suq from the Mahra Sultanate.
1507	Ottoman–Persian War (1505–1517)	Battle of Erzincan	(Turkey)		Ottomans under future Sultan Selim I defeat Safavids.
1508	Mamluk–Portuguese conflicts and Gujarati–Portuguese conflicts	Battle of Chaul	(India)	March	The Portuguese lose their first Indian Ocean naval battle against the Mamluks.
1508	Adil Shahi–Portuguese conflicts	Battle of Dabul	(India)	29 Dec	Viceroy Francisco de Almeida of Portuguese India defeats the Sultanate of Bijapur.
1508		Capture of Baghdad	(Iraq)		Safavids conquer the last Aq Qoyunlu territory in Mesopotamia.
1509	Mamluk–Portuguese conflicts and Gujarati–Portuguese conflicts	Battle of Diu	(India)	3 Feb	Portuguese Viceroy destroys Mamluk Sultanate fleet off the coast of India, wrests control of spice trade.
1509	War of the League of Cambrai	Battle of Agnadello	(Italy)	14 May	French defeat Venetians. Also called the Battle of Vaila.
1509	War of the League of Cambrai	Siege of Padua	(Italy)	15-30 Sep	Venice captures Padua.
1509	War of the League of Cambrai	Battle of Polesella	(Italy)	22 Dec	A fleet of the Republic of Venice is destroyed on the Po River by the Ferrarese artillery.
1510	Adil Shahi–Portuguese conflicts and Bahmani–Vijayanagar War	Conquest of Goa	(India)	25 Nov	Afonso de Albuquerque conquers Goa from the Bijapur Sultanate.
1510	Safavid–Uzbek Wars (1502–1510)	Battle of Merv	(Turkmenistan)	2 Dec	Safavid Iran annexes Greater Khorasan from Bukhara.
1511	War of the League of Cambrai	Siege of Mirandola	(Italy)	Jan	City captured by Pope Julius II.
1511	Şahkulu rebellion	Battle of Çubukova	(Turkey)	July	Ottomans suppress Qizilbash pro-Shia, pro Safavid rebellion.
1511	Ottoman Civil War (1509–1513)	Battle of Tekirdag	(Turkey)	3 Aug	Sultan Bayezid II defeats his son prince Selim.
1511	Malay–Portuguese conflicts	Capture of Malacca	(Malaysia)	15 Aug	Portuguese under Afonso de Albuquerque conquer the Sultanate of Malacca.
1511	Ryō–Hosokawa War	Battle of Funaokayama	(Japan)	25-26 Sept	Hosokawa Takakuni and Ōuchi Yoshioki’s forces defeat Hosokawa Sumimoto’s, Shogun Ashikaga Yoshitane restored as ruler over Kyoto.
1511	Timurid-Uzbek Wars	Battle of Ab Darrah Pass	(Afghanistan)		Babur retakes Transoxiana from the Khanate of Bukhara.
1511	Taíno Rebellion of 1511	Battle of Yaguecas	(Puerto Rico)		Spanish under Juan Ponce de León put down rebellion by the Taino of Puerto Rico, their chief Agueybana II killed in battle.
1512	War of the League of Cambrai	Sack of Brescia	(Italy)	18 Feb	French troops overrun the Italian town of Brescia.
1512	War of the League of Cambrai	Battle of Ravenna	(Italy)	11 April	Gaston de Foix, although killed in the battle, defeats the Spanish.
1512	Persian-Uzbek Wars and Timurid-Uzbek Wars	Battle of Ghazdewan	(Uzbekistan)	12 Nov	Khanate of Bukhara defeat Timurids and Safavids. Afterwards, Babur gives up on retaking Central Asia.
1513		Siege of Aden	(Yemen)	26 March	Portuguese under Afonso de Albuquerque try to capture city from the Tahirid Sultanate but are defeated.
1513	Ottoman Civil War (1509–1513)	Battle of Yenişehir	(Turkey)	24 Apr	Sultan Selim I defeats his brother prince Ahmed.
1513	War of the League of Cambrai	Battle of Novara	(Italy)	6 June	Holy League defeats France.
1513	Hundred Years' Croatian–Ottoman War	Battle of Dubica	(Croatia)	16 Aug	Croatian army defeats forces of the Ottoman Empire.
1513	War of the League of Cambrai	Battle of Guinegate	(France)	16 Aug	Henry VIII and Emperor Maximilian I crush French. Also called the Battle of the Spurs
1513	Moroccan–Portuguese conflicts	Battle of Azemmour	(Morocco)	28-29 Aug	Portugal defeats Morocco's Wattasid dynasty.
1513	War of the League of Cambrai	Battle of Flodden Field	(England)	9 Sep	Henry VIII's army under the Earl of Surrey heavily defeats the Scots and kills James IV of Scotland.
1513	War of the League of Cambrai	Siege of Dijon	(France)	8-13 Sep	Dijon was besieged by Switzerland and a Germany. France ends the siege by signing a treaty with the Swiss.
1513	War of the League of Cambrai	Battle of La Motta	(Italy)	7 Oct	Spain defeats Venice.
1514		Battle of Hartwarder Landwehr	(Germany)	21 Jan	John V, Count of Oldenburg, Henry IV, Duke of Brunswick-Lüneburg, Henry I, Duke of Brunswick and Eric I, Duke of Brunswick-Lüneburg defeat the last Free Frisians, from Butjadingen and Stadland, during the Saxon feud.
1514	Ottoman–Persian Wars	Battle of Chaldiran	(Azerbaijan)	23 Aug	Selim I of Ottoman Turks decisively defeats Persian Safavids and annexes eastern Anatolia and northern Iraq in the aftermath.
1514	Lithuanian–Muscovite War	Battle of Orsha	(Belarus)	8 Sep	Polish–Lithuanian army defeated the army of the Grand Principality of Moscow.
1514	Muisca Civil War	Battle of the Arroyo de las Vueltas	(Colombia)		Bacatá defeated by Hunza in Muisca Civil War, Nemequene killed in battle.
1515		Battle of Turnadağ	(Turkey)	13 Jun	The Ottoman Empire defeats and annexes the Beylik of Dulkadir.
1515	War of the League of Cambrai	Battle of Marignano	(Italy)	13-14 Sep	France defeats Milan.
1515	Frisian peasant rebellion	Arumer Zwarte Hoop	(Netherlands)	1515—1523	Army of peasant rebels in Friesland fights the Dutch authorities.
1516	Italian Wars	War of Urbino	(Italy)	Jan—Sep	Francesco Maria I della Rovere quickly reconquers Urbino.
1516	Campaigns of the Hōjō clan	Siege of Arai	(Japan)	11 July	The Hōjō Clan captures Arai castle.
1516	Ottoman–Mamluk War	Battle of Marj Dabiq	(Syria)	24 Aug	Selim I of Ottoman Turks defeats the Mamelukes and captures Syria.
1516	Spanish-Ottoman Wars	Capture of Algiers	(Algeria)	September-October	Aruj and Hayreddin Barbarossa capture Algiers from the Spanish.
1516	Ottoman–Mamluk War	Battle of Yaunis Khan	(Palestine)	28 Oct	Ottoman Empire defeats the Mamelukes.
1517	Ottoman–Mamluk War	Battle of Ridaniya	(Egypt)	22 Jan	Ottoman Turks under Selim I defeat Mamelukes and capture Egypt.
1517	Somali–Portuguese conflicts	Battle of Zeila	(Somaliland)	Jul	Portugal captures Zeila from the Adal Sultanate.
1517		Battle of Arita-Nakaide	(Japan)	October	Mōri Motonari leading the Mōri clan and Yoshikawa Clans defeats Takeda clan and captures Arita Castle.
1517	Portuguese–Mamluk naval war and Ottoman–Portuguese confrontations	Siege of Jeddah	(Saudi Arabia)	16 Dec	Ottomans finish the conquest of Mamelukes by annexing a city in the Hejaz, then defeat Portuguese fleets going across the Red Sea to attempt to take advantage of the conflict.
1517	Spanish colonization of the Americas	Battle of Catoche	(Mexico)		Spanish expedition under Francisco Hernández de Córdoba beats back Mayan ambush long enough to retreat by sea.
1518		Battle of Kondavidu Fort	(India)		Vijayanagara Empire defeats Golconda Sultanate.
1519	Campaigns of Babur	Battle of Bajaur	(Pakistan)	6-7 Jan	Babur defeats the tribes of the Bajaur region and massacres 3,000 Bajauris.
1519		Battle of Pianosa	(Italy)	25 April	The Genoese admiral Andrew Doria defeats the flotilla of the Barbary corsair Kaid Ali in the Tyrrhenian Sea.
1519	Hildesheim Diocesan Feud	Battle of Soltau	(Germany)	28 June	Henry I, Duke of Brunswick-Lüneburg and John IV of Saxe-Lauenburg, bishop of Hildesheim defeat Henry V, Duke of Brunswick-Lüneburg, duke of Brunswick Wolffenbüttel and Eric I, Duke of Brunswick-Lüneburg, duke of Brunswick-Calenberg-Göttingen.
1519	Spanish colonization of the Americas	Battle of Centla	(Mexico)	25 March	After arriving in the New World, Hernán Cortés defeats the Mayan state of Tabasco in battle.
1520	Spanish colonization of the Americas	Battle of Cempoala	(Mexico)	27 May	Hernán Cortés defeats Pánfilo de Narváez.
1520	Deccani–Vijayanagar wars	Battle of Raichur	(India)	May	Vijayanagara Empire defeats Sultanate of Bijapur.
1520	Spanish colonization of the Americas	Battle of the Night of Sorrows	(Mexico)	30 June—1 July	The Aztec Empire defeats the Spanish troops of Hernán Cortés.
1520	Revolt of the Comuneros	Siege of Segovia	(Spain)	June—Aug	The Spanish royalist army under Rodrigo Ronquillo, fighting for Charles V, Holy Roman Emperor, fails to capture Segovia from the rebel Comuneros.
1520	Spanish colonization of the Americas	Battle of Otumba	(Mexico)	7 July	Spain under Hernán Cortés and Tlaxcala defeat the Aztecs.
1520	Revolt of the Comuneros	Battle of Tordesillas	(Spain)	5 Dec	The Spanish royalist army defeats the Comuneros.
1520	Malay–Portuguese conflicts	Battle of Pago	(Malaysia)		Portugal defeats the Sultanate of Bintan.
1521	Canberdi Ghazâlî Revolt	Battle of Mastaba	(Syria)	27 Jan	The Ottoman Empire defeats rebel governor Janbirdi al-Ghazali of Damascus.
1521		Battle of El Romeral	(Spain)	12 March	A royalist army defeats the Comuneros.
1521		Battle of Miñano Mayor	(Spain)	19 April	The royalist army defeats the Comuneros.
1521		Battle of Villalar	(Spain)	23 April	The royalist army defeats the Comuneros.
1521	Magellan expedition	Battle of Mactan	(Philippines)	27 April	Mactan chieftain Lapulapu overwhelms and decisively defeats Magellan's expedition and allied natives, killing Ferdinand Magellan.
1521	War of the League of Cambrai	Battle of Pampeluna	(Spain)	20 May	French take city from Spanish, Ignatius of Loyola wounded.
1521	Spanish colonization of the Americas	Siege of Tenochtitlan	(Mexico)	26 May—13 Aug	Fall of the Aztec Empire.
1521	Italian War of 1521–1526	Siege of Logroño	(Spain)	4 or 6—10 June	France fails to capture Logroño from Spain.
1521	Italian War of 1521–1526	Battle of Noáin	(Spain)	30 June	Spanish defeat the Franco-Navarrese army.
1521	Acehnese–Portuguese conflicts	Battle of Aceh	(Indonesia)	Jun	The Aceh Sultanate defeats Portugal.
1521	Hungarian–Ottoman Wars	Siege of Belgrade	(Serbia)	July—Aug	Suleiman I of the Ottoman Turks captures Belgrade.
1521	Ming–European conflicts	Battle of Tunmen	(China)	Aug—Sep	Ming Chinese Navy defeated Portuguese Navy.
1521	Italian War of 1521–1526	Battle of Vaprio d'Adda	(Italy)	13-14 Nov	The Holy Roman Empire defeats France.
1521	Italian War of 1521–1526	Siege of Tournai	(Belgium)	Nov	The Holy Roman Empire captures Tournai from France.
1521	Italian War of 1521–1526	Siege of Mézières	(France)		The Holy Roman Empire fails to capture Mézières from France.
1522	Italian War of 1521–1526	Siege of Genoa	(Italy)	20–30 March	Spain captures Genoa for Charles V, Holy Roman Emperor from France.
1522	Italian War of 1521–1526	Siege of Pavia	(Italy)	March—23 April	France and Venice lifts the siege of Pavia after the advance of the armies of the Holy Roman Empire and the Papal States.
1522	Italian War of 1521–1526	Battle of Bicocca	(Italy)	27 April	Spanish victory during the Habsburg-Valois Wars.
1522	Hundred Years' Croatian–Ottoman War	Siege of Knin	(Croatia)	May	Ottomans defeat Croatia and annex the city of Knin.
1522	Ottoman wars in Europe	Siege of Rhodes	(Greece)	26 June—22 Dec	The Ottoman Empire expels the Knights of Rhodes.
1522	Post-War of the League of Cambrai	Battle of San Marcial	(Spain)	30 June	Spain defeats France and Navarre.
1522	Ming–European conflicts	Battle of Xicaowan	(China)	7-20 Aug	Ming Chinese Navy defeated Portuguese Navy.
1523		Battle of Ash-Shihr	(Yemen)	28 Feb - 2 Mar	Portugal captures Al-Shihr from Kathiri.
1523	Malay–Portuguese conflicts	Battle of Muar River	(Malaysia)	Apr	A fleet of the Sultanate of Bintan and the Pahang Sultanate defeats Portugal.
1523	Italian War of 1521–1526	Siege of Fuenterrabía	(Spain)	1523—27 Feb 1524	Spain recaptures Hondarribia from France.
1524	Campaigns of Babur	Sack of Lahore	(Pakistan)	15 Jan	Babur burns Lahore for two days.
1524	Campaigns of the Hōjō clan	Siege of Edo	(Japan)	Jan	Edo Castle falls from Uesugi control to Hōjō control.
1524	Guelders Wars	Siege of Zwolle	(Netherlands)	5–29 April	Charles II, Duke of Guelders fails to conquer Zwolle of the Prince-Bishopric of Utrecht.
1524	Italian War of 1521–1526	Battle of the Sesia	(Italy)	30 April	Spanish and Holy Roman Empire forces beat French.
1524	Spanish colonization of the Americas	Battle of Acajutla	(El Salvador)	8 June	Spanish led by Pedro de Alvarado defeat the army of the Pipils of Cuzcatlan. Pedro de Alvarado wounded.
1524	Italian War of 1521–1526	Siege of Marseille	(France)	Aug—Sep	The Holy Roman Empire fails to take Marseille from France.
1524	Spanish colonization of the Americas	Battle of Tacuzcalco	(El Salvador)	1524—1539	Spanish again defeat Pipils.
1525	Spanish colonization of the Americas	Battle of Punta Quemada	(Colombia)	Jan	Pizarro defeats the Quitians, but is wounded seven times.
1525	Musso War	Battle of Dubino	(Italy)	2 Feb	The Three Leagues defeat the Duchy of Milan.
1525	Italian War of 1521–1526	Battle of Pavia	(Italy)	24 Feb	Spain and Holy Roman Empire defeat France; Francis I of France is captured.
1525	Janissary revolts	Janissary revolt (1525)	(Turkey)	25 March	Suleiman the Magnificent suppresses the Revolt .
1525	German Peasants' War	Battle of Frankenhausen	(Germany)	14–15 May	End of the German Peasants' War.
1525	German Peasants' War	Battle of Meiningen	(Germany)	3 June	German nobles defeat the Bildhäuser Haufen farmers.
1525	German Peasants' War	Battle of Pfeddersheim	(Germany)	23/24 June	Louis V, Elector Palatine defeats the rebel farmers of the Palatinate.
1525	Spanish colonization of the Americas	Siege of Zaculeu	(Guatemala)	Oct	Spanish capture Mayan city of Zaculeu.
1525	Malay–Portuguese conflicts	Battle of Lingga	(Indonesia)		A Portuguese fleet defeats the Sultanate of Bintan and the Sultanate of Indragiri.
1526	Campaigns of Babur	First battle of Panipat	(India)	21 April	The Mughal king Babur defeats Sultan Ibrahim Lodhi.
1526	War of the League of Cognac	Battle of Camollia	(Italy)	25 July	Siena defeats Florence.
1526	Hungarian–Ottoman Wars	Battle of Mohács	(Hungary)	29 Aug	Suleiman I of Ottoman Turks defeats the kingdom of Hungary; King Louis II killed.
1526	Celali rebellions	Baba Zünnun Rebellion	(Turkey)	Aug-Sep	Baba Zünnun who was an Alevi revolted with his troops against the ottomans ,Revolt suppressed.
1526	War of the League of Cognac	Battle of Governolo	(Italy)	25 Nov	The Holy Roman Empire defeats Venice and France.
1526	Campaigns of the Hōjō clan	Siege of Kamakura	(Japan)	Dec	Uesugi clan defeats Hōjō clan, inflicting a major psychological blow.
1527		Battle of Khanwa	(India)	16 March	Babur consolidates Mughal rule in northern India by defeating a united rajput coalition led by Rana Sanga of Mewar.
1527	Celali rebellions	Kalender Çelebi rebellion	(Turkey)		Kalender Çelebi who was an Alevi leader revolted against the ottomans , revolt suppressed .
1527	Habsburg–Ottoman wars in Hungary	Battle of Szőlős	(Romania)	1 May	Serbia defeats Hungary.
1527	War of the League of Cognac	Sack of Rome	(Italy)	6 May	Unpaid Spanish and Imperial troops attack the city in protest.
1527	Habsburg–Ottoman wars in Hungary	Battle of Sződfalva	(Hungary)	25 July	Hungary defeats Serbia.
1527	War of the League of Cognac	Siege of Pavia	(Italy)	1-5 Oct	France captures Pavia from the Holy Roman Empire.
1527		Battle of Sunda Kelepa	(Indonesia)		Demak Sultanate takes port and defeats the Portuguese and Sunda.
1528	Campaigns of Babur	Battle of Chanderi	(India)	20 Jan	Babur defeats and conquers the Malwa.
1528	Habsburg–Ottoman wars in Hungary	Battle of Szina	(Slovakia)	20 March	Habsburgs secure Hungary from claimant to the Hungarian throne John Zápolya.
1528	War of the League of Cognac	Siege of Melfi	(Italy)	22-23 March	France captures Melfi from the Holy Roman Empire and Spain.
1528	War of the League of Cognac	Siege of Cantazaro	(Italy)	March—8 Aug	France fails to capture Catanzaro from the Holy Roman Empire and Spain.
1528	War of the League of Cognac	Battle of Capo d'Orso	(Italy)	28–29 April	French navy defeats Spanish navy trying to break blockade.
1528	War of the League of Cognac	Siege of Naples	(Italy)	April—Aug	Spanish beat back French siege of Italian city.
1528	Spanish colonization of the Americas	Battle of Cinactan	(El Salvador)		Spanish put down native rebellion.
1528		Battle of Mombasa	(Kenya)		Portugal and the Malindi Kingdom defeat the Sultanate of Mombasa.
1528	Persian-Uzbek wars	Battle of Jam	(Iran)		Safavids defeat Uzbeks.
1529	Ethiopian–Adal War	Battle of Shimbra Kure	(Ethiopia)	7 or 9 March	Imam Ahmad Gragn withstands the assault of the numerically superior army of Lebna Dengel, Emperor of Ethiopia.
1529	War of the League of Cognac	Siege of Monopoli	(Italy)	15 March—28 May	The Holy Roman Empire fails to take Monopoli from Venice
1529	Campaigns of Babur	Battle of Ghaghra	(India)	6 May	Babur annexes Bihar for the Mughal Empire and defeats the combined forces of the Eastern Afghan Confederates and the Sultanate of Bengal.
1529	Spanish–Ottoman wars	Capture of Peñón of Algiers	(Algeria)	29 May	The Ottoman Empire captures Peñón of Algiers from Spain.
1529	War of the League of Cognac	Battle of Landriano	(Italy)	21 June	Spanish and Holy Roman Empire troops defeat French.
1529	Habsburg–Ottoman wars in Hungary	Siege of Vienna	(Austria)	27 Sep—15 Oct	Ottomans reach limit of empire, can't capture Vienna and settle in Buda.
1529	Habsburg–Ottoman wars in Hungary	Battle of Formentera	(Spain)	28 Oct	The Ottoman Empire defeated Spain.
1529	War of the League of Cognac	Siege of Florence	(Italy)	24 Oct 1529—10 Aug 1530	Spanish and Holy Roman Empire troops capture Florence.
1530	War of the League of Cognac	Battle of Gavinana	(Italy)	3 Aug	Florence crushed by the Holy Roman Empire.
1530	Little War in Hungary	Siege of Buda	(Hungary)	31 Oct—20 Dec	The Holy Roman Empire fails to capture Buda from the Ottoman Empire.
1530	Inca Civil War	Battle of Chillopampa	(Peru)	1529, 1530 or 1531	Huáscarans defeat the Atahualpans. Atahualpa is taken prisoner.
1530	Inca Civil War	Battle of Mullihambato	(Ecuador)	1529, 1530 or 1531	Atahualpans defeat the Huáscarans.
1531	Ethiopian–Adal War	Battle of Antukyah	(Ethiopia)	Feb or March	The Ethiopian army panics and flees before Imam Ahmad Gragn's seven cannons and matchlockmen.
1531	Spanish colonization of the Americas	Battle of Puná	(Ecuador)	April	Pizarro's forces defeat much larger forces of natives on the island of Puná.
1531	Moldavian–Polish War	Battle of Obertyn	(Ukraine)	22 Aug	Polish army defeats the Moldavians.
1531	European wars of religion	Battle of Kappel	(Switzerland)	11 Oct	Victory of Swiss Catholics over the followers of Zwingli.
1531	Ethiopian–Adal War	Battle of Amba Sel	(Ethiopia)	28 Oct	Imam Ahmad Gragn again defeats Emperor Lebna Dengel, and crosses the Walaqa River unchecked into Bet Amhara.
1532	Inca Civil War	Battle of Huanucopampa	(Peru)	Early 1532	Inconclusive battle between the Atahualpans and the Huáscarans.
1532	Inca Civil War	Battle of Quipaipan	(Peru)	April	Decisive battle with Atahualpa defeating his brother Huáscar.
1532	Inca Civil War	Battle of Chimborazo	(Ecuador)	Spring	Among the first confrontations in the Inca Civil War, with Atahualpa defeating his brother Huáscar.
1532	Little War in Hungary	Siege of Güns	(Hungary)	5-30 Aug	The Ottoman Empire fails to take Kőszeg from the Holy Roman Empire.
1532	Spanish colonization of the Americas	Battle of Cajamarca	(Peru)	16 Nov	Pizarro captures king Atahuallpa during the Spanish conquest of the Inca Empire.
1533	Ottoman–Habsburg wars	Siege of Coron	(Greece)	Spring 1533—1 April 1534	The Ottoman Empire captures Koroni from the Holy Roman Empire.
1533	Ahom–Bengal Sultanate war	Battle of Duimunisila	(India)	October	Kingdom of Ahom defeats Sultanate of Bengal in a naval battle in Assam.
1533	Ahom–Bengal Sultanate war	Battle of Bharali	(India)	October	Ahom decisively repels Bengal invasion.
1533	Guelders Wars	Battle of Jemgum	(Germany)	14 Oct	The army of Guelders defeats the army of East Frisia. Lord Balthasar Oomkens von Esens of Harlingerland becomes a vasal of Guelders.
1533	Spanish colonization of the Americas	Battle of Cuzco	(Peru)	Shortly before 15 Nov	Capital of the Inca Empire taken by the Spanish.
1534		Battle at Bae de Bic	(Canada)	Spring	Iroquois defeat Miꞌkmaq.
1534		Battle at Bouabouscache River	(Canada)	Spring	Mi'kmaq with aid from the Maliseet win a skirmish against the Iroquois, then kill many wounded and retreating on the battlefield the next day.
1534		Battle at Riviere Trois Pistoles	(Canada)	Spring	Mi'kmaq and Maliseet ambush the remaining Iroquois that were searching for their hunting party they'd previously killed. Most Iroquois killed, the rest that were captured were killed later after being taken back to camp.
1534		Battle of Surajgarh	(India)	March	Sher Shah Suri decisively defeats the combined forces of the Sultanate of Bengal and the Lohari chiefs of Bihar.
1534		Battle of Lauffen	(Germany)	13 May	Philip I, Landgrave of Hesse defeats an imperial German army under Philip, Duke of Palatinate-Neuburg and Dietrich Spät, in support of Ulrich, Duke of Württemberg, who regains his duchy.
1534	Spanish colonization of the Americas	Battle of Maraycalla	(Peru)	May	Spain defeats the northern Inca Empire.
1534		Siege of Mediaș	(Romania)	27 Aug—29 Sep	The combined forces of John Zápolya and the Holy Roman Empire capture Mediaș from Alvise Gritti, who was killed during the siege.
1534	Ottoman–Safavid War (1532–1555)	Capture of Baghdad	(Iraq)	December	Ottomans capture Baghdad from the Safavids.
1535	Spanish–Ottoman wars, Ottoman–Habsburg wars and Ottoman–Portuguese conflicts	Conquest of Tunis	(Tunisia)	1 June	The Spanish fleet of Charles V, Holy Roman Emperor, conquers Tunis from the Ottomans.
1535		Battle of Murjakheti	(Georgia (country))	12 Aug	The Kingdom of Imereti, the Principality of Mingrelia and the Principality of Guria defeat Samtskhe-Saatabago.
1535	Spanish–Ottoman wars	Sack of Mahón	(Spain)	1-4 Sep	The Ottoman Empire captures Mahón from Spain.
1535	Malay–Portuguese conflicts	Battle of Ugentana	(Malaysia)		Portugal defeats the Johor Sultanate.
1536	Spanish colonization of the Americas	Battle of Sacsayhuamán	(Peru)	April—May	Spain defeats Manco Inca.
1536	Spanish colonization of the Americas	Siege of Cuzco	(Peru)	6 May 1536—March 1537	Siege of the city of Cuzco by the army of Inca Emperor Manco Inca Yupanqui, Manco Inca is defeated.
1536	Spanish colonization of the Americas	Battle of Reynogüelén	(Chile)	Summer	Spanish defeat Mapuche tribes.
1536	Guelders Wars and Count's Feud	Battle of Heiligerlee	(Netherlands)	5 Aug	The Habsburg army under Georg Schenck van Toutenburg defeats the army of Guelders under Meindert van Ham. Groningen and Drenthe are annexed to the Habsburg imperial domain.
1536	Spanish colonization of the Americas	Siege of Lima	(Peru)	10-26 Aug	Manco Inca fails to capture Lima from Spain.
1536	Croatian–Ottoman wars and Ottoman–Habsburg wars	Siege of Klis	(Croatia)	31 Aug 1536—12 March 1537	The Ottoman Empire captures Klis Fortress.
1536		Battle of Sendanno	(Japan)	Dec	Ikkō-ikki defeat Nagao clan led by Nagao Tamekage.
1536		Battle of Tidore	(Indonesia)	21 Dec	Portugal and Hairun defeat Dayal, the Sultanate of Tidore, the Sultanate of Bacan, the Sultanate of Jailolo, Vaigama, Vaigue, Quibibi and Mincibo.
1536	Malay–Portuguese conflicts	Battle of Ugentana	(Malaysia)		A Portuguese fleet defeats the Johor Sultanate.
1536	Campaigns of the Takeda	Battle of Un no Kuchi	(Japan)		Takeda family forces defeat Hiraga Genshin.
1537	Spanish colonization of the Americas	Battle of Ollantaytambo	(Peru)	Jan	The forces of the Inca emperor Manco Inca defeat the Spanish troops of Hernando Pizarro.
1537	Spanish colonization of the Americas	Battle of Funza	(Colombia)	20 April	Spanish decisively defeat the Muisca.
1537	Spanish colonization of the Americas	Battle of Abancay	(Peru)	12 July	Diego de Almagro defeats and captures Alonso de Alvarado.
1537	Third Ottoman–Venetian War	Siege of Corfu	(Greece)	Aug—Sep	Venetians defeat Ottoman attempt to take island.
1537	Little War in Hungary and Hundred Years' Croatian–Ottoman War	Battle of Gorjani	(Croatia)	9 Oct	The Ottoman Empire defeats the Holy Roman Empire.
1538	Spanish colonization of the Americas	Battle of Las Salinas	(Peru)	26 April	Pizarro brothers defeat Diego de Almagro.
1538	Ottoman–Portuguese confrontations and Gujarati–Portuguese conflicts	Siege of Diu	(India)	26 June—6 Nov	Portuguese defeat Ottomans and Gujarat Sultanate who attempted to siege city.
1538	Spanish colonization of the Americas	Battle of Tocarema	(Colombia)	19-20 Aug	With assistance from the Muisca, the Spanish defeat and partly subjugate the Panche.
1538	Third Ottoman–Venetian War	Battle of Preveza	(Greece)	28 Sep	Ottoman fleet defeats Spanish-Venetian fleet.
1538	Toungoo–Hanthawaddy War	Battle of Naungyo	(Myanmar)	Nov/Dec	Toungoo Kingdom led by their General and future King Bayinnaung decisively defeats a numerically larger force of the Hanthawaddy kingdom in Myanmar.
1539	Afghan-Mughal Wars	Battle of Chausa	(India)	26 June	Defeat for Afghan Mughal loyalists by Sur Empire.
1539	Third Ottoman–Venetian War	Siege of Castelnuovo	(Montenegro)	18 July—6 Aug	The Ottoman Empire captures Herceg Novi from the Holy Roman Empire.
1540		Battle of Kannauj	(India)	17 May	Defeat for Afghan Mughal loyalists. Also known as the Battle of Bilgram.
1540	Spanish–Ottoman wars	Battle of Girolata	(France)	15 June	Spain and Genoa defeat the Ottoman navy.
1540	Ottoman–Habsburg wars	Battle of Alborán	(Spain)	1 Oct	Spain defeats the Ottoman navy.
1540	Spanish colonization of the Americas	Battle of Mabila	(United States)	18 Oct	Spanish conquistador Hernando de Soto's forces destroy the fortress town of Mabila in present-day Alabama, killing Tuskaloosa.
1540	Toungoo–Hanthawaddy War	Siege of Martaban	(Myanmar)	Nov 1540—May 1541	Toungoo under King Tabinshwehti conquers the last remnant of the Hanthawaddy kingdom after taking the city of Martaban.
1541	Ethiopian–Adal war and Ottoman–Portuguese conflicts	Battle of Sahart	(Ethiopia)	24 April	Ethiopian Emperor Gelawdewos defeats an attack by Garad Emar, a lieutenant of Imam Ahmad Gragn. However, the Emperor is forced south into Shewa and away from the advancing troops of Portuguese commander Christovão da Gama.
1541	Ottoman–Portuguese conflicts (1538–1560)	Battle of Suez	(Egypt)	26 Apr	The Ottoman Empire defeats Portugal.
1541	Somali–Portuguese conflicts	Battle of Massawa (1541)	(Eritrea)	Apr	Adal Sultanate victory.
1541	Little War in Hungary	Siege of Buda	(Hungary)	4 May—21 Aug	The Holy Roman Empire fails to take Buda from the Ottoman Empire.
1541	Arauco War	Destruction of Santiago	(Chile)	11 Sept	Mapuche burn and severely damage Santiago, but are repelled.
1542	Ethiopian–Adal War and Somali-Portuguese conflicts	Battle of Baçente	(Ethiopia)	2 Feb	Portuguese under Christovão da Gama capture a Moslem-occupied hillfort in northern Ethiopia.
1542	Campaigns of the Takeda	Battle of Sezawa	(Japan)	9 March	Takeda Shingen defeats four enemy forces to begin his conquest Shinano Province.
1542	Ethiopian–Adal War, Ottoman–Portuguese conflicts and Somali–Portuguese conflicts	Battle of Jarte	(Ethiopia)	4–16 April	The Portuguese under Christovão da Gama encounter the army of Imam Ahmad Gragn in two successive victories.
1542	Toungoo–Ava War	Battle of Northern Prome	(Myanmar)	April	Toungoo led by Tabinshwehti and Bayinnaung defeats armies of Prome, Ava, and the Confederation of Shan States outside the city of Prome.
1542	Toungoo–Ava War	Battle of Padaung Pass	(Myanmar)	April	Toungoo led by Bayinnaung trap and defeat the Arakan Kingdom of Mrauk U. Tabinshwehti is so pleased with this victory he appoints Bayinnaung his heir apparent. Prome eventually surrenders after this battle.
1542	Ethiopian–Adal War and Somali-Portuguese conflicts	Battle of the Hill of the Jews	(Ethiopia)	Aug	During the rainy season, Christovão da Gama captures a strategic position and many badly needed horses.
1542	Anglo-Scottish Wars	Battle of Haddon Rig	(Scotland)	24 Aug	Scottish victory over the English.
1542	Ethiopian–Adal War and Somali-Portuguese conflicts	Battle of Wofla	(Ethiopia)	28 Aug	Reinforced with at least 600 arquebusiers and cavalry, Imam Ahmad Gragn attacks the Portuguese camp. The Portuguese are scattered, Christovão da Gama captured and executed.
1542	Spanish colonization of the Americas	Battle of Chupas	(Peru)	16 Sep	Spanish in Peru defeat rogue army of Diego de Almagro II and execute him.
1542	Anglo-Scottish Wars	Battle of Solway Moss	(England)	25 Nov	English victory over Scotland.
1542	Campaigns of Oda Nobuhide	Battle of Azukizaka	(Japan)		Oda Nobuhide defeats Imagawa Yoshimoto.
1542	Campaigns of the Takeda	Siege of Uehara	(Japan)		Takeda Shingen captures Uehara Castle from Suwa Yorishige.
1542	Campaigns of the Takeda	Siege of Kuwabara	(Japan)		One day after Uehara, Shingen defeats Yorishige again. Yorishige then commits suicide.
1542	Campaigns of the Takeda	Siege of Fukuyo	(Japan)		Takeda Shingen captures Fukuyo fortress. Battle of Ankokuji follows, Takato Yoritsugu defeated.
1542	Scottish clan wars	Battle of Alltan-Beath	(Scotland)		Scottish clan battle.
1542	Italian War of 1542–1546	Siege of Perpignan	(France)		French siege raised by Spanish army.
1542	Ottoman–Habsburg War of 1540–1547	Siege of Pest	(Hungary)		The Holy Roman Empire fails to take Pest from the Ottoman Empire.
1542	Somali–Portuguese conflicts	Battle of Benadir	(Somalia)		Naval battle between Portuguese and Ajuran Sultanate.
1543	Ethiopian–Adal War, Ottoman–Portuguese conflicts and Somali–Portuguese conflicts	Battle of Wayna Daga	(Ethiopia)	11 Feb	Ethiopian/Portuguese troops decisively defeat their Muslim opponent; Imam Ahmad Gragn killed.
1543	Italian War of 1542–1546	Siege of Landrecies	(France)	May—Nov	The Holy Roman Empire fails to capture Landrecies from France.
1543	Italian War of 1542–1546	Battle of Muros Bay	(Spain)	25 July	Spanish fleet defeats French fleet.
1543	Ottoman–Habsburg War of 1540–1547	Siege of Esztergom	(Hungary)	25 July—10 Aug	The Ottoman Empire captures Esztergom from the Holy Roman Empire.
1543	Italian War of 1542–1546	Siege of Nice	(France)	5-22 Aug	Ottomans and French sack Nice.
1543	Croatian–Ottoman wars and Ottoman–Habsburg wars	Battle of Otočac	(Croatia)	24 Aug (?)	Croatian troops defeat Ottoman Turks.
1543	Toungoo-Ava War	Battle of Prome	(Myanmar)	7 Dec	Confederation unsuccessfully attempts to retake Prome from Toungoo.
1543	Campaigns of the Takeda	Siege of Nagakubo	(Japan)		Shingen defeats Oi Sadataka
1544	Italian War of 1542–1546	Battle of Ceresole	(Italy)	11 April	French forces defeat Holy Roman Empire in Italy.
1544	Italian War of 1542–1546	Battle of Serravalle	(Italy)	2–4 June	Spanish and Holy Roman Empire defeat Italian mercenaries.
1544	Italian War of 1542–1546	Siege of Saint-Dizier	(France)	10 July—17 Aug	The Holy Roman Empire captures Saint-Dizier from France.
1544	Italian War of 1542–1546	First Siege of Boulogne	(France)	19 July—18 Sep	English forces capture Boulogne.
1544	Scottish clan wars	Battle of the Shirts	(Scotland)	July	Scottish clan battle.
1544	Italian War of 1542–1546	Second Siege of Boulogne	(France)	Oct	French forces unsuccessfully besiege the town.
1544		Battle of Sammel	(India)		Victory for the Sur Empire against the Kingdom of Marwar.
1544	Toungoo–Ava War	Battle of Salin	(Myanmar)		Tabinshwehti and Bayinnaung take Confederation of Shan States city in three days deep into their territory.
1544	Campaigns of the Takeda	Siege of Kojinyama	(Japan)		Takeda Shingen continues his conquest of Ima Valley, Shinano Province.
1545	War of the Rough Wooing	Battle of Ancrum Moor	(Scotland)	27 Feb	Scottish victory over the English.
1545	Italian War of 1542–1546	Battle of the Solent	(England)	18–19 July	Indecisive naval battle between France and England, English flagship Mary Rose sinks.
1545	Italian War of 1542–1546	Battle of Bonchurch	(England)	July	French invade Isle of Wight and are repulsed.
1545	Campaigns of the Hōjō clan	Battle of Kawagoe	(Japan)	Oct 1545—19 May 1546	Hōjō forces defeat the Uesugi, foiling a siege.
1545	Campaigns of the Takeda	Siege of Takatō	(Japan)		Takeda Shingen defeats Takatō Yoritsugu, taking his castle.
1545	Campaigns of the Takeda	Siege of Ryūgasaki	(Japan)		The Takeda family defeats Tozawa Yorichika.
1545		Battle of Sokhoista	(Turkey)		The Ottoman Empire defeats the Kingdom of Imereti, the Kingdom of Kartli and the Principality of Guria.
1546	Spanish colonization of the Americas	Battle of Iñaquito	(Ecuador)	18 Jan	The army of Gonzalo Pizarro defeats the army of the hated viceroy Blasco Núñez Vela, who was killed.
1546	Arauco War	Battle of Quilacura	(Chile)	11 Feb	Spain defeats the Mapuche.
1546		Battle of Periș	(Romania)	24 Aug	Voivode Mircea the Shepherd of Wallachia defeats rebel boyars.
1547	Taungoo–Mrauk-U War	Battle of Mrauk U	(Myanmar)	23 Jan	Taongoo led by Tabinshwehti fail to take capital of the Kingdom of Mrauk U.
1547	Schmalkaldic War	Battle of Mühlberg	(Germany)	24 April	Emperor Charles V captures elector of Saxony and lays siege to Wittenberg.
1547	Schmalkaldic War	Battle of Drakenburg	(Germany)	23 May	The German Protestant Schmalkaldic League defeats the German imperial and German Roman Catholic forces.
1547	Rough Wooing	Battle of Pinkie	(Scotland)	10 Sep	Earl of Hertford guardian of Edward VI crushes Scottish resistance.
1547	Spanish colonization of the Americas	Battle of Huarina	(Bolivia)	20 Oct	The army of Gonzalo Pizarro defeats the army of viceroy Diego Centeno, newly appointed by Charles V, Holy Roman Emperor.
1547	Acehnese–Portuguese conflicts	Battle of Perlis River	(Malaysia)	6 Dec	A Portuguese fleet defeats the Aceh Sultanate.
1547	Gujarati–Portuguese conflicts	Battle of Bharuch	(India)		Portugal defeats the Gujarat Sultanate.
1548	Campaigns of the Takeda	Battle of Uedahara	(Japan)	14 Feb	Takeda Shingen defeats Murakami Yoshikiyo.
1548		Battle of al-Shihr	(Yemen)	7 Apr	Portugal and the Mahra Sultanate defeat Kathiri.
1548		Battle of Shuangyu	(China)	June	Ming dynasty destroys the pirate haven Shuangyu.
1548	Spanish colonization of the Americas	Battle of Jaquijahuana	(Peru)	9 April	Loyalists sent by the Crown of Spain to depose Gonzalo Pizarro as governor of Peru defeat and capture him.
1548	Campaigns of the Takeda	Battle of Shirojiritoge	(Japan)	22 Aug	Takeda Shingen surprises and defeats Ogasawara Nagatoki in a dawn attack.
1549	Campaigns of the Shimazu	Siege of Kajiki	(Japan)	May	Shimazu clan captures Kajiki castle.
1549	Kett's Rebellion	Battle of Dussindale	(England)	27 Aug	Final battle putting an end of Kett's Rebellion, took place outside Norwich.
1549	Campaigns of the Takeda	Siege of Fukashi	(Japan)		Takeda Shingen captures several of Nagatoki's castles, forcing him to flee to Kyoto.
1549	Burmese–Siamese wars	Battle of Ayutthaya	(Thailand)		Tabinshwehti withdraws from attack on the Siamese capital.
1549	Burmese–Siamese wars	Battle of Kamphaeng Phet	(Thailand)		Tabinshwehti takes advantage of Siam's eagerness to crush Toungoo's retreat to trap and defeat the Siamese. Prince Ramesuan and Maha Thammaracha captured.
1549		Battle of Vedalai	(India)		The Vijayanagara Empire captures Vedalai from Portugal.
1549		Battle of Danki	(Senegal)		Cayor defeats its overlord the Jolof Empire, killing Burba Leele Fuli Fak, disentagrating the Jolof as an empire where they survived as a rump kingdom and gaining independence for all its vassals.
1550	Arauco War	Battle of Andalien	(Chile)	6 Feb	The Mapuche are defeated by the Spanish.
1550	Arauco War	Battle of Penco	(Chile)	12 March	The Mapuche are defeated by the Spanish.
1550	Spanish–Ottoman wars	Capture of Mahdia	(Tunisia)	28 June—Sep	Spain captures Mahdia.
1550	Protestant Reformation	Battle of Sauðafell	(Iceland)	2 Oct	Jón Arason, the last Catholic Bishop of Iceland, is defeated and captured.

== Late 16th century (1551–1600) ==
Year	War	Battle	Loc.	Date(s)	Description
1551	Italian War of 1551–1559	Siege of Mirandola	(Italy)	July 1551—March 1552	Pope Julius III besieges town then withdraws.
1551	Ottoman-Habsburg wars and Italian War of 1551–1559	Siege of Tripoli	(Libya)	15 Aug	The garrison of the Knights of Malta in the fortress of Tripoli surrender to Ottoman besiegers after a bombardment lasting six days.
1551	Campaigns of the Takeda	Sieges of Toishi	(Japan)		Takeda Shingen takes the castle of Toishi after besieging it multiple times starting in 1550.
1552	Ottoman–Habsburg War	Siege of Temesvár	(Romania)	24 June—27 July	Ottoman Empire captures town
1552	Ottoman–Habsburg War	Battle of Palást	(Slovakia)	5 Aug	The Ottoman Empire defeats the Holy Roman Empire.
1552	Italian War of 1551–1559	Battle of Ponza	(Italy)	10–11 Aug	Franco-Ottoman fleet defeats Genoese fleet.
1552	Ottoman–Portuguese conflicts	Capture of Muscat	(Oman)	Aug	Muscat captured from Portuguese by Ottoman fleet.
1552	Russo-Kazan Wars	Siege of Kazan	(Russia)	2 Sep—13 Oct	Ivan the Terrible defeats the Kazan Khanate.
1552	Ottoman–Habsburg War	Siege of Eger	(Hungary)	9 Sep—17 Oct	Hungarian victory over Ottoman Turks.
1552	Italian War of 1551–1559	Siege of Metz	(France)	Oct 1552—Jan 1553	Unsuccessful siege by Holy Roman Empire.
1552	Ottoman–Safavid War (1532–1555)	Battle of Erzurum	(Turkey)	1552 or 1553	Safavid Iran defeats the Ottoman Empire.
1553	Campaigns of the Takeda and of Uesugi Kenshin	First Battle of Kawanakajima	(Japan)	June	indecisive battle between Takeda Shingen and Uesugi Kenshin.
1553	Ottoman–Portuguese conflicts (1538–1560)	Battle of the Bay of Velez	(Spain)	5 Jul	A fleet of the Regency of Algiers defeats Portugal.
1553	Second Margrave War	Battle of Sievershausen	(Germany)	9 July	Maurice, Elector of Saxony and Duke Henry V, Duke of Brunswick-Lüneburg defeat Albert Alcibiades, Margrave of Brandenburg-Kulmbach.
1553	Second Margrave War	Siege of Kulmbach and Plassenburg	(Germany)	22 Nov 1553—22 June 1554	A German imperial army captures Kulmbach on 26 November and massacres the population. The castle Plassenburg surrenders with Albert Alcibiades, Margrave of Brandenburg-Kulmbach.
1553	Arauco War	Battle of Tucapel	(Chile)	25 Dec	Mapuche defeat Spanish conquistadors.
1553	Second Margrave War	Siege of Hof	(Germany)		A German imperial army captures Hof from Albert Alcibiades, Margrave of Brandenburg-Kulmbach.
1553	Campaigns of the Takeda	Siege of Katsurao	(Japan)		Takeda Shingen captures fortress.
1554	Arauco War	Battle of Marihueñu	(Chile)	23 Feb	Mapuche defeat Spanish conquistador Francisco de Villagra.
1554	Second Margrave War	Battle of Schwarzach	(Germany)	13 June	A German imperial army defeats Albert Alcibiades, Margrave of Brandenburg-Kulmbach.
1554	Italian War of 1551–1559	Battle of Marciano	(Italy)	2 Aug	Florence finally defeats Siena.
1554	Ottoman–Portuguese conflicts	Battle of the Gulf of Oman	(Oman)	10-25 Aug	Portuguese destroy Ottoman fleet.
1554	Italian War of 1551–1559	Battle of Renty	(France)	12 Aug	Francis, Duke of Guise repels an Imperial invasion of Picardy.
1554	Conflicts between the Regency of Algiers and Morocco	Battle of Tadla	(Morocco)	Sep	Saadi dynasty defeat Wattasids.
1554	Campaigns of the Mōri clan	Battle of Oshikibata	(Japan)		Mōri clan defeat Sue Harukata.
1555	Russo-Swedish War	Battle of Kivinebb	(Russia)	11 March	Swedish victory over Russians
1555	Humayun Campaign	Battle at Machhiwara	(India)	15 May	Mughal Empire defeats Suri Empire
1555	Humayun Campaign	Battle of Sirhind	(India)	22 June	Mughal Empire has decisive victory over the Suri Empire
1555	Campaigns of the Takeda and of Uesugi Kenshin	Second Battle of Kawanakajima	(Japan)	Aug—Nov	Takeda Shingen defeats Uesugi Kenshin
1555	Spanish–Ottoman wars	Capture of Bougie	(Algeria)	16-28 Sep	Ottomans capture Béjaïa from Spain
1555	Campaigns of the Mōri clan	Battle of Miyajima	(Japan)	16 Oct	Mōri clan defeat Ōuchi clan on sacred island of Miyajima
1555		Battle of Chapar Ghata	(India)	December	Bengal Sultan Muhammad Khan Sur killed in battle against Sur Empire.
1555	Scottish clan wars	Battle of Garbharry	(Scotland)		Battle fought between Clan MacKay and Clan Sutherland
1556	Muromachi period	Battle of Nagara-gawa	(Japan)	April	Saitō Yoshitatsu defeats father Saitō Dōsan
1556	Arauco War	Battle of Peteroa	(Chile)	June—July	Spanish victory over Mapuche
1556	Spanish–Ottoman wars	Siege of Oran	(Algeria)	Aug	Ottoman troops besiege the Spanish garrison in Oran
1556		Battle of Inō	(Japan)	27 Sept	Oda Nobunaga defeats his brother Oda Nobuyuki.
1556	Humayun Campaign	Battle of Tughlaqabad	(India)	7 Oct	Hemu defeats Mughal forces and occupies Delhi
1556	Humayun Campaign	Second battle of Panipat	(India)	5 Nov	Akbar the Great defeats Hemu
1556	Georgian-Safavid wars	Battle of Garisi	(Georgia (country))		Georgia defeats Safavid Empire, King Luarsab I falls in battle
1557	Campaigns of the Takeda and of Uesugi Kenshin	Third Battle of Kawanakajima	(Japan)		Takeda Shingen repelled by Uesugi Kenshin.
1557	Conflicts between the Regency of Algiers and Morocco	Campaign of Tlemcen	(Algeria)		Ottoman vassal the Regency of Algiers defeats the Moroccan Saadi dynasty.
1557	Italian War of 1551–1559	Battle of St. Quentin	(France)	10 Aug	Emmanuel Philibert of Savoy defeats Anne de Montmorency.
1557	Arauco War	Battle of Lagunillas	(Chile)	8 Nov	Spanish defeat Mapuche.
1557	Arauco War	Battle of Millarapue	(Chile)	30 Nov	Spanish defeat Mapuche.
1557	Sinhalese–Portuguese War	Siege of Kotte	(Sri Lanka)	Nov 1557—Nov 1558	Sitawaka besiege Portuguese. Portuguese break out.
1558	Italian War of 1551–1559	Siege of Calais	(France)	7 Jan	France capture the city from the English.
1558	Conflicts between the Regency of Algiers and Morocco	Battle of Wadi al-Laban	(Morocco)	March—April	Between Moroccos and Ottomans. Ottomans retreat.
1558	Italian War of 1551–1559	Siege of Thionville	(France)	27 April—23 June	France conquers Thionville from Spain.
1558	Livonian War	Siege of Narva	(Estonia)	April—May	Russians besiege Narva.
1558		Siege of Terabe	(Japan)	May-June	Oda clan led by Oda Nobunaga defeats Matsudaira clan. Tokugawa Ieyasu's first battle.
1558	Italian War of 1551–1559	Battle of Gravelines	(France)	13 July	Spain defeats France.
1558	Italian War of 1551–1559	Ottoman invasion of the Balearic Islands	(Spain)	July	Ottomans capture Balearic Islands during the Ottoman–Habsburg wars.
1558		Battle of Ukino	(Japan)	24 Aug	Oda Nobunaga defeats his cousin Oda Nobukata and unites all of Owari province.
1558	Spanish–Ottoman wars	Mostaganem Expedition	(Algeria)	Aug—Sep	Spanish forces fail to capture Mostaganem from the Ottomans.
1558	Arauco War	Battle of Quiapo	(Chile)	13 Dec	Spanish defeat Mapuche.
1558		Battle of Rio de Janeiro	(Brazil)		Portuguese destroy French settlement of Henriville.
1559		Battle of the Princes	(Turkey)	30 May - 1 Jun	Prince Selim defeats his brother, prince Şehzade Bayezid. Civil war in the Ottoman Empire.
1559	Ottoman–Portuguese conflicts	Siege of Bahrain	(Bahrain)	July—Nov	Portuguese successfully defend island from Ottoman siege.
1559		Battle of Spancel Hill	(Republic of Ireland)		Sir Donnell O'Brien defeats Connor O'Brien, 3rd Earl of Thomond and his ally Richard Burke, 2nd Earl of Clanricarde in County Clare.
1559	Sinhalese–Portuguese War	Battle of Mulleriyawa	(Sri Lanka)		Kingdom of Sitawaka defeats Portuguese.
1560	The Reformation	Battle of Glasgow	(Scotland)	18 March	Lords of the Congregation defeat French.
1560	Spanish–Ottoman wars	Battle of Djerba	(Tunisia)	9–14 May	Ottoman fleet defeats Holy League.
1560	Campaigns of Oda Nobunaga and of Tokugawa Ieyasu	Battle of Okehazama	(Japan)	12 June	Oda Nobunaga's small forces ambush and slay warlord Imagawa Yoshimoto.
1560	Campaigns of Oda Nobunaga and of Tokugawa Ieyasu	Siege of Marune	(Japan)		Forces of Imagawa Yoshimoto defeat forces of Oda Nobunaga. Led to the Battle of Okehazama.
1560	Campaigns of Azai Nagamasa	Battle of Norada	(Japan)		In Japan, the Azai clan gains its independence from the Rokkaku.
1560	Livonian War	Battle of Ērģeme	(Latvia)		Russian Tsardom defeats Livonian Confederacy so decisively that the Livonian Order was disbanded.
1560	Portuguese colonial campaigns	Invasion of Jaffna	(Sri Lanka)		Portuguese invade Kingdom of Jaffna.
1561	Campaigns of the Takeda and of Uesugi Kenshin	Fourth Battle of Kawanakajima	(Japan)	18 Oct	Takeda Shingen defeats Uesugi Kenshin in the climax of their ongoing conflicts.
1561		Battle of Verbia	(Romania)	18 Nov	Moldavian rebels under Iacob Heraclid, with the support of Poland-Lithuania, the Austrian Habsburgs, the Knights Hospitaller and the Zaporozhian Sich defeat prince Alexandru Lăpușneanu of Moldavia, with the support of the Ottoman Empire and Wallachia.
1561	Campaigns of the Mōri clan	Siege of Moji	(Japan)		Mōri clan break siege by Ōtomo Sōrin and Portuguese traders.
1561	Campaigns of the Hōjō clan and of Uesugi Kenshin	Siege of Odawara	(Japan)		Hōjō clan resist siege by Uesugi Kenshin.
1562	Livonian War	Battle of Nevel	(Russia)	19 Aug	Tactical Polish victory over Russia.
1562	First French War of Religion	Battle of Vergt	(France)	9 Oct	French Royalists and Spain defeat French Huguenots.
1562	Mary, Queen of Scots Civil Wars	Battle of Corrichie	(Scotland)	28 Oct	Victory for Queen Mary's forces.
1562	First French War of Religion	Battle of Dreux	(France)	19 Dec	Catholics versus Huguenots in France. Both leaders captured.
1562	Sinhalese–Portuguese War	Battle of Mulleriyawa	(Sri Lanka)		Sitawaka forces defeat Portuguese near Colombo.
1563		Battle of Lincoya Fortress	(Chile)	16 Jan	Mapuche capture Lincoya Fortress from Spain.
1563	First French War of Religion	Siege of Orléans	(France)	5-19 Feb	Catholics besiege Protestants.
1563	Ottoman–Habsburg wars	Sieges of Oran and Mers El Kébir	(Algeria)	April—June	Spanish victory.
1563	Northern Seven Years' War	Battle of Bornholm	(Denmark)	30 May	Naval battle between Denmark and Sweden.
1563	Northern Seven Years' War	Capture of Älvsborg	(Sweden)	4 Sep	Danes capture Älvsborg.
1563	Northern Seven Years' War	Battle of Öland	(Sweden)	11 Sep	Naval battle between Denmark and Sweden.
1563	Northern Seven Years' War	Battle of Mared	(Sweden)	9 Nov	Danes beat Swedes.
1563	Campaigns of the Takeda and of the Hōjō clan	Siege of Musashi-Matsuyama	(Japan)		Combined Takeda clan-Hōjō clan army regain Musashi-Matsuyama castle
1564	Campaigns of Tokugawa Ieyasu	Battle of Azukizaka	(Japan)	15 Jan	Tokugawa Ieyasu defeats the Ikkō-ikki.
1564	Livonian War	Battle of Ula	(Belarus)	26 Jan	Lithuanians defeat Russians.
1564	Arauco War	Siege of Concepción	(Chile)	1 Feb—1 April	Mapuche besiege Spanish.
1564	Burmese–Siamese War	Siege of Ayutthaya	(Thailand)	Feb	Toungoo dynasty under Bayinnaung decisively defeats Siam and their Portuguese mercenaries. Ayutthaya Kingdom becomes vassal state of Toungoo.
1564	Northern Seven Years' War	First battle of Öland	(Sweden)	30–31 May	Danish fleet beat Swedish fleet.
1564	Arauco War	Battle of Angol	(Chile)	25 March	Spain defeats the Mapuche.
1564		Battle of Vescovato	(France)	5 July	Corsican rebels under Sampiero Corso defeat Genoa.
1564	Campaigns of the Takeda and of Uesugi Kenshin	Fifth Battle of Kawanakajima	(Japan)	Sep—Nov	Indecisive battle between Takeda Shingen and Uesugi Kenshin.
1564	Campaigns of the Hōjō clan	Battle of Kōnodai	(Japan)		Hōjō clan forces defeat the forces of Satomi Yoshihiro.
1565	Deccani–Vijayanagar wars	Battle of Talikota	(India)	26 Jan	Deccan sultanates defeat Vijayanagara Empire.
1565	Private war between Fitzgeralds and Butlers	Battle of Affane	(Republic of Ireland)	Feb	Butlers beat the Geraldines.
1565	Irish Clan Wars	Battle of Glentaisie	(Northern Ireland)	2 May	O'Neills defeat Clan MacDonald of Dunnyveg.
1565	Spanish–Ottoman wars and Ottoman–Habsburg wars	Siege of Malta	(Malta)	18 May—8 Sep	Knights of Malta defeat Turkish forces.
1565	Northern Seven Years' War	Battle of Rügen	(Germany)	21 May	Swedish Fleet beats Danish fleet.
1565	Portuguese colonial campaigns	Battle of Fukuda Bay	(Japan)	18 Oct	Two Portuguese trade vessels repel attack by forces of Matsura Takanobu.
1565	Northern Seven Years' War	Battle of Axtorna	(Sweden)	20 Oct	Danes beat the Swedes.
1566	Habsburg–Ottoman war of 1565–1568	Battle of Szigetvár	(Hungary)	6 Aug—8 Sep	2,300 Hungarian defenders are annihilated by an army of 90,000 soldiers of the Ottoman Empire.
1566	Northern Seven Years' War	Battle of Brobacka	(Sweden)	9 Aug	Swedish army ambushes and defeats Danish army.
1566	Eighty Years’ War	Siege of Valenciennes	(France)	14 Dec 1566—23 March 1567	Spain captures Valenciennes from Calvinist rebels.
1566	Eighty Years’ War	Battle of Wattrelos	(France)	27 Dec	Spain defeats rebel Calvinists.
1566	Eighty Years’ War	Battle of Lannoy	(France)	29 Dec	Spain defeats rebel Calvinists.
1566	Campaigns of the Takeda	Siege of Minowa	(Japan)		Takeda Shingen captures Minowa castle from Uesugi clan.
1567	Portuguese colonial campaigns	Battle of Rio de Janeiro	(Brazil)	20 Jan	Portuguese finally defeat French colony.
1567	Eighty Years' War	Battle of Oosterweel	(Belgium)	13 March	Traditionally seen as the beginning of the Eighty Years' War. Spain defeats Dutch rebels.
1567	Irish Clan Wars	Battle of Farsetmore	(Republic of Ireland)	8 May	Part of the Clan war between the O'Neills and the O'Donnells.
1567	Marian civil war	Battle of Carberry Hill	(United Kingdom)	15 June	Mary, Queen of Scots forces defeated by James Douglas, 4th Earl of Morton and James Stewart, 1st Earl of Moray.
1567	Campaigns of Oda Nobunaga	Siege of Inabayama Castle	(Japan)	13-27 Sep	Oda Nobunaga defeats the Saito clan and takes control of Inabayama Castle and Mino province.
1567	Mughal-Rajput War	Siege of Chittorgarh	(India)	Oct	Mughal forces successfully besiege Rajputs in Chittor Fort.
1567	Second French War of Religion	Battle of Saint-Denis	(France)	10 Nov	16,000 Royalists defeat 5,000 Huguenots near Paris.
1567	Georgian–Safavid wars	Battle of Digomi	(Georgia (country))		Georgian king Simon I of Kartli repulses Persian attack near Tbilisi.
1567	Spanish colonization of the Americas	Battle of Maracapana	(Venezuela)		Spanish defeat coalition of tribes led by Guaicaipuro.
1568	Second French War of Religion	Siege of Chartres	(France)	28 Feb—15 March	Huguenots besiege Royalists.
1568	Eighty Years War	Battle of Dahlen	(Germany)	25 April	Dutch attempt to conquer Roermond.
1568	Marian civil war	Battle of Langside	(Scotland)	13 May	James Stewart, 1st Earl of Moray defeats the forces of his half-sister, Mary, Queen of Scots, forcing her to flee to England.
1568	Eighty Years War	Battle of Heiligerlee	(Netherlands)	23 May	Dutch army ambushes Spanish army.
1568	Eighty Years War	Battle on the Ems	(Netherlands)	23 May	A fleet of the Geuzen defeats Spain.
1568	Eighty Years War	Siege of Groningen	(Netherlands)	June—15 July	Dutch army fails to take Groningen from Spain.
1568	Eighty Years War	Battle of Jemmingen	(Germany)	21 July	Spanish army under the Duke of Alva defeats the Dutch army.
1568	Second Anglo-Spanish trade war	Battle of San Juan de Ulúa	(Mexico)	23 Sep	Spanish fleet defeats English privateers.
1568	Dutch Revolt	Battle of Jodoigne	(Belgium)	20 Oct	Spain defeats Dutch army.
1568	Campaigns of the Hōjō clan and of the Takeda	Siege of Hachigata	(Japan)		Takeda Shingen is unable to take a Hōjō fortress.
1568	Acehnese–Portuguese conflicts	Siege of Malacca	(Malaysia)		Sultan of Aceh attacks Portuguese-held Malacca and is defeated.
1569	Arauco War	Battle of Catirai	(Chile)	7 Jan	Mapuche defeat Spanish.
1569	Mughal-Rajput War	Siege of Ranthambore	(India)	8 Feb—21 March	Mughal forces capture Ranthambore Fort.
1569	Second French War of Religion	Battle of Jarnac	(France)	13 March	French Catholic forces defeat French Huguenots.
1569	Second French War of Religion	Battle of La Roche-l'Abeille	(France)	25 June	French Huguenots defeat French Catholic forces.
1569	Second French War of Religion	Battle of Orthez	(France)	24 Aug	Huguenots defeat Royalist forces.
1569	Second French War of Religion	Battle of Moncontour	(France)	3 Oct	French Catholic forces defeat French Huguenots decisively.
1569	Campaigns of the Hōjō clan and of Uesugi Kenshin	Siege of Odawara	(Japan)		Takeda Shingen's forces burn the Hōjō clan controlled town.
1569	Campaigns of the Hōjō clan and of the Takeda	Battle of Mimasetoge	(Japan)		Takeda Shingen escapes a trap set for him by the Hōjō clan.
1569	Campaigns of the Hōjō clan and of the Takeda	Siege of Kanbara	(Japan)		Takeda Katsuyori successfully besieges and captures Kanbara castle.
1570	Spanish colonization of the Philippines	Battle of Manila	(Philippines)	24 May	Martin de Goiti decisively defeats the Rajahnate of Maynila and annexes the Philippines for the Spanish Empire.
1570	Campaigns of Azai Nagamasa, of Tokugawa Ieyasu, of Toyotomi Hideyoshi and of Oda Nobunaga	Battle of Anegawa	(Japan)	30 July	Nobunaga joins forces with Tokugawa Ieyasu to defeat the Asakura and Azai.
1570	Fourth Ottoman–Venetian War	Siege of Famagusta	(Cyprus)	17 Sep 1570—5 Aug 1571	Ottoman Turks besiege and capture Famagusta.
1570	Clan Cameron-Clan Mackintosh feud	Battle of Bun Garbhain	(Scotland)		Clan Cameron decisively defeat the Clan Mackintosh.
1570	Campaigns of Oda Nobunaga	Siege of Chōkō-ji	(Japan)		Unsuccessful attempt to retake a castle captured by Oda Nobunaga.
1570	Campaigns of Azai Nagamasa, of Tokugawa Ieyasu and of Oda Nobunaga	Siege of Kanegasaki	(Japan)		Forces of Oda Nobunaga capture Kanegasaki fortress.
1570	Campaigns of the Takeda	Siege of Hanazawa	(Japan)		Takeda clan captures Hanazawa castle from Imagawa clan.
1571	Arauco War	Battle of Purén	(Chile)	28 Jan	The Mapuche defeat Spain.
1571	Russo-Crimean Wars and Russo-Turkish wars	Fire of Moscow	(Russia)	24 May	Crimean Tatars burn Moscow.
1571	Campaigns of Oda Nobunaga	First siege of Nagashima	(Japan)	May	Unsuccessful attempt by Nobunaga to take the fortress.
1571	Spanish colonization of the Philippines	Battle of Bangkusay Channel	(Philippines)	3 June	Spanish settler fleet defeats local Kapampangan fleet.
1571	Campaigns of Oda Nobunaga and of Azai Nagamasa	Siege of Mount Hiei	(Japan)	30 Sep	Nobunaga defeats the Tendai Warrior Monks and razes their temple complex.
1571	Fourth Ottoman–Venetian War	Battle of Lepanto	(Greece)	7 Oct	Spain and Venice's fleets defeat the Ottoman fleet.
1571	Clan Gordon – Clan Forbes feud and Marian civil war	Battle of Tillieangus	(Scotland)	10 Oct	Clan Gordon overcomes Clan Forbes.
1571	Clan Gordon – Clan Forbes feud and Marian civil war	Battle of Craibstone	(Scotland)	20 Nov	Clan Gordon overcomes Clan Forbes again.
1571	Campaigns of the Hōjō clan and of the Takeda	Siege of Fukazawa	(Japan)		Takeda Shingen captures Fukazawa from Hōjō clan.
1571	Campaigns of Uesugi Kenshin	Battle of Tonegawa	(Japan)		Unresolved conflict between Uesugi forces and Takeda forces.
1572	Eighty Years' War	Capture of Brielle	(Netherlands)	1 April	Marked a turning point in the uprising of the Low Countries against Spain in the Eighty Years' War.
1572	Campaigns of the Shimazu clan	Battle of Kizaki	(Japan)	June	Forces of Shimazu Takahisa defeated the larger army of Itō Yoshisuke in Japan.
1572	Eighty Years' War	Siege of Mons	(Belgium)	June—Sep	Successful Spanish siege of Dutch held town.
1572	Eighty Years' War	Battle of Saint-Ghislain	(Belgium)	June—Sep	Spanish army defeats a Dutch army.
1572	Russo-Crimean Wars and Russo-Turkish wars	Battle of Molodi	(Russia)	29 July—2 Aug	The Crimean Tatars and Ottoman Janissaries are routed by Russians near Moscow.
1572	Eighty Years' War	Siege of Kampen	(Netherlands)	9-11 Aug	Dutch rebels under Willem IV van den Bergh capture Kampen from Spain.
1572	Eighty Years' War	Relief of Goes	(Netherlands)	20 Oct	Spanish raise the Dutch siege of Goes.
1572		Battle of Hitokotosaka	(Japan)	Oct	Takeda Shingen defeats Tokugawa Ieyasu.
1572	Fourth French War of Religion	Siege of La Rochelle	(France)	Nov 1572—July 1573	Catholic troops besiege Protestant Huguenots. Negotiated settlement.
1572	Fourth French War of Religion	Siege of Sancerre	(France)	Nov 1572—Aug 1573	Catholic forces besieged Protestant Huguenots. Siege abandoned.
1572	Eighty Years' War	Siege of Middelburg	(Netherlands)	Nov 1572—Feb 1574	Dutch rebel army successfully besieged Middelburg, held by Spanish forces under Cristóbal de Mondragón.
1572	Eighty Years' War	Siege of Haarlem	(Netherlands)	11 Dec 1572—13 July 1573	Spanish successfully besiege Protestant garrison at Haarlem.
1572	Campaigns of the Takeda and of Tokugawa Ieyasu	Siege of Futamata	(Japan)		Takeda Shingen captures one of Tokugawa Ieyasu's fortresses.
1573	Campaigns of the Takeda	Siege of Iwamura	(Japan)	Early 1573	Takeda Shingen's forces led by Akiyama Nobutomo capture Iwamura castle
1573	Campaigns of Tokugawa Ieyasu and of Oda Nobunaga	Battle of Mikatagahara	(Japan)	25 Jan	Tokugawa Ieyasu is forced to retreat from Takeda Shingen.
1573	Livonian War	Battle of Lode	(Estonia)	Jan	Swedes defeat Russians.
1573	Croatian–Slovene Peasant Revolt	Battle of Stubica	(Croatia)	9 Feb	Habsburg Imperial forces defeat Peasant rebels.
1573	Eighty Years' War	Battle of Flushing	(Netherlands)	17 April	Dutch rebels manage to capture 5 Spanish ships.
1573	Eighty Years' War	Battle of Borsele	(Netherlands)	22 April	A Spanish fleet under Sancho d'Avila is forced to retreat by a Dutch fleet under Admiral Worst.
1573	Eighty Years' War	Battle of Haarlemmermeer	(Netherlands)	26 May	The Dutch failed in an attempt to break the siege of Haarlem.
1573	Campaigns of the Takeda	Siege of Noda	(Japan)	May	Takeda Shingen is killed.
1573	Eighty Years' War	Capture of Geertruidenberg	(Netherlands)	28 Aug	English, French Huguenot and Fleming forces capture Geertruidenberg from Franco-Spanish Catholic garrison.
1573	Eighty Years' War	Siege of Alkmaar	(Netherlands)	Aug—Oct	Dutch garrison fight off Spanish force under Don Fadrique.
1573	Campaigns of Oda Nobunaga and of Azai Nagamasa	Siege of Ichijo ga dani	(Japan)	Sep	Nobunaga effectively destroys the Asakura.
1573	Eighty Years' War	Battle on the Zuiderzee	(Netherlands)	11 Oct	Dutch fleet destroyed a larger and better-equipped Spanish fleet on the Zuiderzee.
1573	Campaigns of Oda Nobunaga, of Azai Nagamasa and of Toyotomi Hideyoshi	Siege of Odani	(Japan)	Oct	Nobunaga defeats Azai Nagamasa, effectively destroying the Azai family.
1573	Eighty Years' War	Battle of Delft	(Netherlands)	Oct	Anglo-Dutch force under Thomas Morgan repels Spanish force under Francisco de Valdez.
1573	Eighty Years' War	Siege of Leiden	(Netherlands)	Oct 1573—3 Oct 1574	Spanish under Francisco de Valdez unsuccessfully besiege Leiden.
1574	Eighty Years' War	Battle of Reimerswaal	(Netherlands)	29 Jan	Sancho d'Avila's attempt to resupply his troops ends up in the destruction of his fleet by Anglo-Dutch forces.
1574	Eighty Years' War	Capture of Valkenburg	(Netherlands)	Feb	English troops surrender Valkenburg Castle in Holland to Spanish forces.
1574	Eighty Years' War	Battle of Mookerheyde	(Netherlands)	14 April	Spanish army decisively beats the Dutch Army.
1574	Eighty Years' War	Battle of Lillo	(Belgium)	30 May	Lodewijk van Boisot with 64 Dutch ships destroys the Spanish fleet near Antwerp.
1574	Moldavian campaign (1574)	Battle of the Cahul	(Ukraine) / (Moldova)	9 Jun	The Ottoman Empire and the Crimean Khanate defeat Moldavia and the Zaporozhian Cossacks.
1574	Campaigns of Oda Nobunaga	Second siege of Nagashima	(Japan)	July	Nobunaga's second attempt is foiled by a counter-attack.
1574	Eighty Years' War	Siege of Zaltbommel	(Netherlands)	July—14 Oct	Spain fails to capture Zaltbommel from the Dutch.
1574	Spanish–Ottoman wars	Conquest of Tunis	(Tunisia)	13 Sep	Ottoman Empire finally defeats Spanish Empire for control of North Africa.
1574	Eighty Years' War	Battle of Zoetermeer	(Netherlands)	17 Sep	The Dutch defeat Spain.
1574	Spanish colonization of the Philippines	Battle of Manila	(Philippines)	29 Nov	Spanish under Juan de Salcedo and Don Galo decisively defeat Chinese pirates.
1574	Campaigns of Tokugawa Ieyasu	Battle of Takatenjin	(Japan)		Takeda Katsuyori, son of Takeda Shingen, captures Tokugawa Ieyasu's fortress of Takatenjin.
1574	Campaigns of Oda Nobunaga	Siege of Itami	(Japan)		Nobunaga defeats Araki Murashige who had rebelled.
1575	Mughal invasion of Bengal	Battle of Tukaroi	(India)	3 March	Mughals defeat Sultanate of Bengal.
1575	Eighty Years' War	Siege of Buren	(Netherlands)	28 June	Spain captures Buren from the Dutch.
1575	Campaigns of Oda Nobunaga, of Tokugawa Ieyasu and of the Takeda	Battle of Nagashino	(Japan)	28 June	Nobunaga repels the forces of Takeda Katsuyori.
1575		Battle of Kerelőszentpál	(Romania)	9 Jul	Prince Stephen Báthory of Transylvania, the Ottoman Empire and Wallachia defeat Gáspár Bekes, the Austrian Habsburgs and the Székelys.
1575	Eighty Years' War	Siege of Oudewater	(Netherlands)	19 July—7 Aug	Spain captures Oudewater from the Dutch.
1575	Eighty Years' War	Siege of Schoonhoven	(Netherlands)	11-24 Aug	Spain captures Schoonhoven from the Dutch.
1575	Eighty Years' War	Siege of Bommenede	(Netherlands)	11-24 Aug	Spain captures Bommenede from the Dutch.
1575	Eighty Years' War	Siege of Woerden	(Netherlands)	8 Sep 1575—10 Sep 1576	Spain fails to capture Woerden from the Dutch.
1575	Fourth French War of Religion	Battle of Dormans	(France)	10 Oct	French Royalists defeat French Malcontents.
1575	Eighty Years' War	Siege of Zierikzee	(Netherlands)	Oct 1575—29 July 1576	Spain captures Zierikzee from the Dutch.
1575	Campaigns of Oda Nobunaga	Third siege of Nagashima	(Japan)		Nobunaga finally captures Nagashima fortress.
1576	Eighty Years' War	Siege of Krimpen aan de Lek	(Netherlands)	30 Jan—21 Feb	The Dutch capture Krimpen aan de Lek from Spain.
1576	Eighty Years' War	Siege of Muiden	(Netherlands)	9 May	The Dutch fail to capture Muiden from Spain.
1576	Campaigns of Oda Nobunaga	Siege of Mitsuji	(Japan)	May	Honganji forces defeat Nobunaga's army, killing Harada Naomasa.
1576	Mughal–Rajput wars	Battle of Haldighati	(India)	18 June	Mughals defeat Mewar.
1576	Mughal invasion of Bengal	Battle of Rajmahal	(India)	12 July	Mughals led by Akbar decisively defeat the Bengal Sultanate, capture and later execute their last sultan Daud Khan Karrani.
1576	Campaigns of Oda Nobunaga and of the Mōri clan	First Battle of Kizugawaguchi	(Japan)	Aug	Unsuccessful naval blockade by Nobunaga.
1576	Eighty Years' War	Battle of Vissenaken	(Belgium)	14 Sep	Spain defeats a rebel army of the Netherlands.
1576	Eighty Years' War	Siege of Spanjaardenkasteel	(Belgium)	15 Sep—11 Nov	The Netherlands capture Spanjaardenkasteel from Spain.
1576	Eighty Years' War	Siege of Vredenburg Castle	(Netherlands)	21 Dec 1576—11 Feb 1577	The Union of Brussels captures Vredenburg Castle from Spain.
1577	War of the Gdańsk Rebellion	Battle of Lubieszów	(Poland)	17 April	Polish army defeats Danzig Rebellion army
1577	Eighty Years' War	Siege of Breda	(Netherlands)	4 Aug—4 Oct	The Dutch capture Breda from Spain.
1577	Campaigns of Oda Nobunaga, of Toyotomi Hideyoshi and of Uesugi Kenshin	Battle of Tedorigawa	(Japan)	3 Nov	Nobunaga launches an unsuccessful attack on the forces of Uesugi Kenshin
1577		Siege of Penukonda	(India)		Sultanate of Bijapur unsuccessfully attempts to take Vijayanagara capital of Penukonda.
1578	Eighty Years' War	Battle of Gembloux	(Belgium)	31 Jan	Don John of Austria crushes Protestant army.
1578	Eighty Years' War	Siege of Zhichem	(Belgium)	20-24 Feb	Spain captures Zichem from the Union of Brussels.
1578	Eighty Years' War	Siege of Nivelles	(Belgium)	8–12 March	Spain captures Nivelles from the Union of Brussels.
1578	Eighty Years' War	Siege of Limbourg	(Belgium)	10–15 June	Spain captures Limbourg from the Union of Brussels.
1578	Eighty Years' War	Siege of Kampen	(Netherlands)	25 June-20 July	The Union of Brussels captures Kampen from Spain.
1578	Eighty Years' War	Battle of Rijmenam	(Belgium)	31 July	The Spanish forces were dealt a strategic defeat by the Dutch.
1578	Moroccan–Portuguese conflicts	Battle of Alcazarquivir	(Morocco)	4 Aug	Moors defeat Portuguese army, kill King Sebastian of Portugal.
1578	Ottoman–Safavid War	Battle of Çıldır	(Turkey)	9 Aug	Ottoman Turks defeat Safavid Persia and conquer the Caucasus.
1578	Eighty Years' War	Siege of Deventer	(Netherlands)	3 Aug—19 Nov	The Union of Brussels captures Deventer from Spain.
1578	Eighty Years' War	Siege of Binche	(Belgium)	22 Sep—7 Oct	The Union of Brussels captures Binche from Spain.
1578	Campaigns of Toyotomi Hideyoshi	Siege of Miki	(Japan)	1578—1580	Hideyoshi captures Miki castle from Nagaharu
1578	Campaigns of Oda Nobunaga and of the Mōri clan	Second Battle of Kizugawaguchi	(Japan)		Nobunaga defeats the naval forces of the Mōri clan.
1578	Campaigns of Oda Nobunaga, Toyotomi Hideyoshi and of the Mōri clan	Siege of Kozuki	(Japan)		Hideyoshi is defeated by the Mōri clan.
1579	Battle of Ahobilam		(India)		A military conflict fought between the Vijayanagara Empire and the Golconda Sultanate.
1579	Eighty Years' War	Siege of Kerpen	(Germany)	7-15 Jan	Spain captures Kerpen from the Dutch.
1579	Eighty Years' War	Battle of Borgerhout	(Belgium)	7-15 Jan	Spain defeats the Union of Utrecht.
1579	Eighty Years' War	Siege of Maastricht	(Netherlands)	12 March—1 July	20,000 Spanish troops under Farnese captures the city defended by 2,000 Dutch soldiers and civilians.
1579	Eighty Years' War	Battle of Baasrode	(Belgium)	14 Aug	Spain defeats the Union of Utrecht. William of Orange is nearly captured.
1579	Campaigns of Toyotomi Hideyoshi	Siege of Itami	(Japan)		Hideyoshi captures Itami castle from Araki Murashige.
1580	Eighty Years' War	Siege of Groningen	(Netherlands)	3 March—18 June	The Union of Utrecht fails to capture Groningen from Spain.
1580	Eighty Years' War	Battle of Hardenbergerheide	(Netherlands)	17 June	Spain defeats the Union of Utrecht.
1580	War of the Portuguese Succession	Battle of Alcântara	(Portugal)	25 Aug	Spanish candidate to the Portuguese throne defeats national candidate
1580	Campaigns of Oda Nobunaga	Siege of Ishiyama Honganji	(Japan)	Aug	Kōsa surrenders to Nobunaga after a ten-year siege
1580	Eighty Years' War	Siege of Cambrai	(France)	Sep 1580—17 Aug 1581	Spain fails to capture Cambrai from the Union of Utrecht and France.
1580	Eighty Years' War	Siege of Steenwijk	(Netherlands)	18 Oct 1580—23 Feb 1581	Spain fails to capture Steenwijk from the Union of Utrecht.
1580	War of the Portuguese Succession	Capture of Porto	(Portugal)	24 Oct	Mainland Portugal is secured by the Spanish
1580	Second Desmond Rebellion	Siege of Smerwick	(Republic of Ireland)	7-10 Nov	English forces defeat freelance Papal States army that captured the Irish village and massacre most of the soldiers afterwards.
1580	Campaigns of Oda Nobunaga and of the Takeda	Siege of Takatenjin	(Japan)	1580—22 March 1581	Oda Nobunaga captures Takeda controlled castle
1581	Campaigns of Oda	Siege of Tottori	(Japan)	May	Hideyoshi captures Tottori Castle. The castle's lord commits suicide.
1581	War of the Portuguese Succession	Battle of Salga	(Portugal)	25 July	The Azores successfully resist a personal union with Spain.
1581	Eighty Years' War	Siege of Breda	(Netherlands)	26–27 July	Spanish troops took the Dutch city by surprise.
1581	Eighty Years' War	Battle of Goor	(Netherlands)	23 July—1 Aug	The Union of Utrecht fails to capture Goor from Spain.
1581	Eighty Years' War	Battle of Noordhorn	(Netherlands)	30 Sep	Spain defeats the Union of Utrecht and England.
1581	Eighty Years' War	Siege of Niezijl	(Netherlands)	3-24 Oct	Spain fails to capture Niezijl from the Union of Utrecht.
1581	Eighty Years' War	Siege of Tournai	(Belgium)	10 Oct—30 Nov	Spain captures Tournai from the Union of Utrecht.
1581		Battle of Jilkua	(Bangladesh)		Taraf annexed by Twipra Kingdom assisted by the Baro-Bhuiyan confederation.
1582	Campaigns of Oda Nobunaga, of Tokugawa Ieyasu and of the Takeda	Battle of Temmokuzan	(Japan)	11 March	Tokugawa Ieyasu and Oda Nobunaga destroy the forces of Takeda Katsuyori, who commits suicide.
1582	Ghent War	Siege of Oudenaarde	(Belgium)	19 April—5 July	Spain captures Oudenaarde from the Union of Utrecht.
1582	Campaigns of Oda Nobunaga, of Toyotomi Hideyoshi and of the Mōri clan	Siege of Takamatsu	(Japan)	April—June	Hideyoshi captures Takamatsu Castle. The lord of this castle also commits suicide.
1582	Campaigns of Oda Nobunaga	Battle of Honnō-ji	(Japan)	21 June	Nobunaga is defeated by Akechi Mitsuhide, who forces him to commit suicide.
1582	Campaigns of Toyotomi Hideyoshi	Battle of Yamazaki	(Japan)	2 July	Hideyoshi defeats Akechi Mitsuhide, the murderer of his master Oda Nobunaga.
1582	Eighty Years' War	Siege of Lochem	(Netherlands)	22 July—15 Sep	Spain fails to capture Lochem from the Union of Utrecht.
1582	War of the Portuguese Succession	Battle of Ponta Delgada	(Portugal)	26 July	Spain wins a naval battle in the War of the Portuguese Succession.
1582	Eighty Years' War	Keppel Castle	(Netherlands)	26-30 Sep	The Union of Utrecht captures Keppel Castle from Spain.
1582	Russian conquest of Siberia	Battle of Chuvash Cape	(Russia)	4 Nov	Russians decisively defeat and conquer the Khanate of Sibir in Siberia.
1582	Campaigns of Toyotomi Hideyoshi	Battle of Uchide-hama	(Japan)		Hideyoshi again defeats Nobunaga's murderer, Akechi Mitsuhide.
1583	Pre-Anglo-Spanish War	Battle of São Vicente	(Brazil)	3 Feb	Skirmish where three English ships defeated three Spanish galleons.
1583	Eighty Years' War	Siege of Eindhoven	(Netherlands)	7 Feb—23 April	Spain captures Eindhoven from the Union of Utrecht.
1583	Ottoman–Safavid War	Battle of Torches	(Dagestan) (Russia)	9–11 May	Ottoman Turks defeat Safavid Persians at the end of three days of battle.
1583	Campaigns of Toyotomi Hideyoshi	Battle of Shizugatake	(Japan)	May	Hideyoshi relieves one of his allies who was under siege.
1583	Eighty Years' War	Battle of Steenbergen	(Netherlands)	17 June	Spain defeats the Union of Utrecht.
1583	War of the Portuguese Succession	Conquest of the Azores	(Portugal)	2 Aug	Spain integrates the Habsburg dynasty as the rulers of Portugal.
1583	Eighty Years' War	Siege of Ghent	(Belgium)	Oct 1583—17 Sep 1584	Spain captures Ghent from the Union of Utrecht.
1583	Cologne War	Battle of Hüls	(Germany)	19 Nov	German Calvinists defeat German Catholics.
1584	Eighty Years' War and Cologne War	Battle of Terborg	(Netherlands)	31 March	Spain defeats the Electorate of Cologne, ally of the Union of Utrecht.
1584	Eighty Years' War and Cologne War	Siege of Zutphen	(Netherlands)	May—July	The Union of Utrecht fails to capture Zutphen from Spain.
1584	Eighty Years' War	Siege of Antwerp	(Belgium)	July 1584—17 Aug 1585	Spain captures Antwerp from the Union of Utrecht.
1584	Eighty Years' War	Siege of Brussels	(Belgium)	Aug 1584—10 March 1585	Spain captures Brussels from the Union of Utrecht.
1584		Siege of Suemori	(Japan)	9 Oct	Toyotomi clan forces defend castle from Tokugawa clan.
1584	Hundred Years' Croatian–Ottoman War	Battle of Slunj	(Croatia)	26 Oct	Croatian army defeats forces of the invading Ottoman Empire.
1584	Campaigns of Toyotomi Hideyoshi and of Tokugawa Ieyasu	Battle of Komaki and Nagakute	(Japan)		Hideyoshi is defeated by Tokugawa Ieyasu
1585	Eighty Years' War	Battle on the Kouwensteinsedijk	(Belgium)	May	The Union of Utrecht fails to relieve Antwerp, and end the siege by the Spanish army.
1585	Eighty Years' War	Battle of Amerongen	(Netherlands)	23 June	Spain defeats the Union of Utrecht.
1585	Campaigns of Toyotomi Hideyoshi, of the Chōsokabe clan and of the Mōri clan	Invasion of Shikoku	(Japan)	June—Aug	Hideyoshi conquers the island
1585	Campaigns of Toyotomi Hideyoshi, of the Chōsokabe clan and of the Mōri clan	Siege of Ichinomiya	(Japan)		Hideyoshi captures Ichinomiya Castle from the Chōsokabe clan.
1585	Eighty Years' War and Anglo-Spanish War	Siege of IJsseloord	(Netherlands)	6-15 Oct	Dutch and English defeat Spain.
1586	Anglo-Spanish War	Battle of Santo Domingo	(Dominican Republic)	1 Jan	English under Francis Drake defeat and raid Spanish colony.
1586	Eighty Years' War	Battle of Boksum	(Netherlands)	17 Jan	Spain defeats The Netherlands.
1586	Anglo-Spanish War	Battle of Cartagena de Indias	(Colombia)	9-11 Feb	Francis Drake defeats Spanish and plunders city.
1586	Eighty Years' War and Anglo-Spanish War	Siege of Grave	(Netherlands)	Early April—7 June	Spain captures Grave after a treaty with the English and Dutch troops.
1586	Anglo-Spanish War	Raid on St. Augustine	(United States)	27–29 May	Francis Drake devastates Spanish colony.
1586	Eighty Years' War and Anglo-Spanish War	Siege of Venlo	(Netherlands)	28 June	Spain captures Venlo from The Netherlands.
1586		Battle of Leitao Coast	(Iran)	June	Arab Niquilus defeat Portugal
1586	Anglo-Spanish War	Battle of Pantelleria	(Italy)	13 July	The English navy defeats Spain and Malta.
1586	Eighty Years' War and Cologne War	Siege of Rheinberg	(Germany)	13 Aug 1586—3 Feb 1590	Spain captures Rheinberg, a rebel Protestant stronghold in the Electorate of Cologne defended by Dutch and English troops.
1586	Eighty Years' War	Battle of Zutphen	(Netherlands)	22 Sep	Spanish defeat Dutch rebels.
1586	Eighty Years' War	Siege of Zutphen	(Netherlands)	Sep—Oct	The Netherlands and England fail to capture Zutphen from Spain.
1587	Eighty Years' War and Anglo-Spanish War	Siege of Sluis	(Netherlands)	12 June—4 Aug	Spain captures Sluis from The Netherlands.
1587	War of the Three Henrys	Battle of Coutras	(France)	20 Oct	Huguenot forces defeat the French Royal Army.
1587	War of the Three Henrys	Battle of Vimory	(France)	26 Oct	French Royalist forces defeat foreign Huguenot forces.
1588	War of the Polish Succession	Battle of Byczyna	(Poland)	24 Jan	Polish faction supporting King Sigismund III Vasa defeats an Austrian Habsburg faction led by Archduke Maximilian III of Austria trying to claim the Polish throne.
1588	Eighty Years' War	Siege of Medemblik	(Netherlands)	27 Feb—29 April	The Netherlands capture Medemblik from rebel commander Diederik Sonoy and English soldiers.
1588	Cologne War	Siege of Bonn	(Germany)	March—24 Sep	Spain captures Bonn, capital of the Electorate of Cologne, for the Catholic archbishop Ernest of Bavaria from German Calvinists, supporting Gebhard Truchsess von Waldburg, the former archbishop, who had converted to Calvinism.
1588		Battle of Gravelines	(France)	29 July	Spanish Armada beaten decisively in battle against the English and Dutch fleet.
1588	Eighty Years' War and Anglo-Spanish War	Siege of Bergen op Zoom	(Netherlands)	23 Sep—13 Nov	Spain fails to capture Bergen op Zoom from The Netherlands.
1589	Eighty Years' War	Siege of Heusden	(Netherlands)	Summer—Oct	Spain fails to capture Heusden from The Netherlands.
1589	Janissary revolts	Beylerbeyi event	(Turkey)	April	janissary demands met , chief treasurer and beylerbey excuted, sipahis also revolted but were ambushed by palace guards, killing 400 of them and ending their rebellion.
1589	Succession of Henry IV of France and Anglo-Spanish War	Battle of Arques	(France)	15-29 Sep	King Henry IV of France and England defeat the French Catholic League.
1589	Eighty Years' War	Battle of Zoutkamp	(Netherlands)	5-9 Oct	The Netherlands capture Zoutkamp from Spain.
1590	Eighty Years' War	Capture of Breda	(Netherlands)	4 March	The Netherlands and England capture Breda from Spain.
1590		Battle of Tondibi	(Mali)	13 March	Saadi dynasty of Morocco decisively defeats the Songhai Empire, leading to its collapse.
1590	Succession of Henry IV of France and Anglo-Spanish War	Battle of Ivry	(France)	14 March	Henri IV of Navarre defeats Catholic League.
1590	Anglo-Spanish War	Battle of the Strait of Gibraltar	(Spain)	24 April	English secure passage of company ships after defeating Spain.
1590	Succession of Henry IV of France	Siege of Paris	(France)	7 May—30 Aug	King Henry IV of France, England and French Huguenots fail to capture Paris from the French Catholic League, aided by Spain. Paris was a staunch supporter of the Catholic cause.
1590	Campaigns of Toyotomi Hideyoshi, of Tokugawa Ieyasu, of the Mōri clan, of the Chōsokabe clan, of the Shimazu clan and of the Hōjō clan	Siege of Odawara	(Japan)	May—4 Aug	the Go-Hōjō clan surrendered to Toyotomi Hideyoshi, and Japan was unified (1590).
1590	Campaigns of Toyotomi Hideyoshi, of the Mōri clan, of the Chōsokabe clan and of the Hōjō clan	Siege of Shimoda	(Japan)	May—Aug	Hideyoshi's forces successfully besiege Hōjō clan.
1590	Campaigns of Toyotomi Hideyoshi and of the Hōjō clan	Siege of Hachigata	(Japan)		Hideyoshi again defeats Hōjō clan.
1591	Anglo-Spanish War	Battle of the Strait of Gibraltar	(Spain)	24 April	The English navy defeats Spain.
1591	Eighty Years' War and Anglo-Spanish War	Siege of Zutphen	(Netherlands)	19–30 May	The Netherlands and England capture Zutphen from Spain.
1591	Eighty Years' War	Siege of Deventer	(Netherlands)	1–10 June	The Netherlands and England capture Deventer from Spain.
1591	Anglo-Spanish War	Battle of the Berlengas	(Portugal)	15 July	The Spanish navy defeats England.
1591	Eighty Years' War and Anglo-Spanish War	Siege of Knodsenburg	(Netherlands)	21–25 July	The Netherlands and England capture Knodsenburg from Spain.
1591	Mughal conquest of Gujarat	Battle of Bhuchar Mori	(India)	July	Mughal Empire defeated combined Kathiawar forces led by Nawanagar State
1591	Anglo-Spanish War	Battle of Flores	(Portugal)	30 Aug—1 Sep	Spain defeats England.
1591	Eighty Years' War and Anglo-Spanish War	Battle of the Gulf of Almería	(Spain)	Late Aug	The Spanish navy defeats The Netherlands and England.
1591	Campaigns of Toyotomi Hideyoshi	Siege of Kunohe Castle	(Japan)	13 Mar-4 Sept	Full unification of Japan under Toyotomi Hideyoshi after rebellion is suppressed.
1591	War of the Three Henrys	Battle of Pontcharra	(France)	17 Sep	France defeats Savoy
1591	Eighty Years' War and Anglo-Spanish War	Siege of Hulst	(Netherlands)	20-24 Sep	The Netherlands capture Hulst from Spain.
1591	Eighty Years' War and Anglo-Spanish War	Siege of Nijmegen	(Netherlands)	17-21 Oct	The Netherlands and England capture Nijmegen from Spain.
1591	Succession of Henry IV of France and Anglo-Spanish War	Siege of Rouen	(France)	11 Nov 1591—20 April 1592	King Henry IV of France, England and The Netherlands fail to capture Rouen from the French Catholic League. Spain helped defend the city.
1592	Anglo-Spanish War	Battle of Flores	(Portugal)	20 May—13 Aug	The English navy defeats Spain.
1592	Succession of Henry IV of France and Anglo-Spanish War	Battle of Craon	(France)	21–24 May	Spain and the French Catholic League defeat French royalists and England.
1592	Imjin War	Siege of Busan	(South Korea)	24–25 May	Japanese defeat Koreans. Occurred 13–14 April on the Lunar Calendar.
1592	Eighty Years' War and Anglo-Spanish War	Siege of Steenwijk	(Netherlands)	30 May—5 July	The Netherlands and England capture Steenwijk from Spain.
1592	Imjin War	Battle of Sangju	(South Korea)	3 June	Konishi Yukinaga defeats the Koreans under Yi Il. Occurred 25 April on the Lunar calendar.
1592	Imjin War	Battle of Ch'ungju	(South Korea)	7 June	Japanese forces decisively defeat the Koreans. Occurred 28 April on the Lunar calendar.
1592	Imjin War	Battle of Okpo	(South Korea)	16 June	The Korean Navy defeats a Japanese convoy. Occurred 7 May on the Lunar calendar.
1592	Hundred Years' Croatian–Ottoman War	Battle of Brest, Croatia	(Croatia)	19 July	Brest captured by the Ottomans.
1592	Eighty Years' War and Anglo-Spanish War	Siege of Coevorden	(Netherlands)	26 July—2 Sep	The Netherlands and England capture Coevorden from Spain.
1592	Imjin War	Battle of Hansan Island	(South Korea)	14 Aug	Korean Navy defeats Japanese Navy.
1592	Imjin War	Battle of Busan	(South Korea)	1 Nov	Korean Navy could not recapture Busan from Japan.
1592	Imjin War	Siege of Jinju	(South Korea)	8-13 Nov	Siege of Jinju Fortress. Commander Kim Si-min repulses the Japanese commander Hosokawa Tadaoki, due to the arrival of a Korean relief force led by Gwak Jae-u.
1592	Anglo-Spanish War	Battle of the Bay of Biscay	(France)	Nov	The Spanish navy defeats England.
1593	Imjin War	Battle of Byeokjegwan	(South Korea)	27 Jan	Battle between Japan and China in Seoul. The Japanese army led by Ukita Hideie and Kobayakawa Takakage defeated the Ming Chinese army under Li Rusong.
1593	Imjin War	Siege of Pyongyang	(North Korea)	6-8 Feb	Ming Chinese general Li Rusong aiding Joseon defeats Konishi Yukinaga. Japan is expelled from Pyongyang.
1593	Imjin War	Battle of Haengju	(South Korea)	14 March	The Korean army under commander Gwon Yul defenders were successful in repelling the Japanese forces.
1593	Eighty Years' War and Anglo-Spanish War	Siege of Geertruidenberg	(Netherlands)	27 March—24 June	The Netherlands and England capture Geertruidenberg from Spain.
1593	Anglo-Spanish War and Succession of Henry IV of France	Battle of Blaye	(France)	18 April	The Spanish navy defeats England and French royalists.
1593	Long Turkish War and Hundred Years' Croatian–Ottoman War	Battle of Sisak	(Croatia)	22 June	Forces of the Holy Roman Empire defeat forces of the Ottoman Empire.
1593	Imjin War	Siege of Jinju	(South Korea)	20–27 July	Japanese defeat Koreans.
1593	Eighty Years' War and Anglo-Spanish War	Siege of Coevorden	(Netherlands)	Oct 1593—7 May 1594	Spain fails to capture Coevorden from The Netherlands.
1593	Johnstone-Maxwell feud	Battle of Dryfe Sands	(Scotland)	6 Dec	A clash between Clan Maxwell and Clan Johnstone.
1593	Burmese–Siamese War	Battle of Nong Sa Rai	(Thailand)		Thai Ayutthaya Kingdom under Naresuan defeats final attempt to keep Siam subjugated by Nanda Bayin. Naresuan regains independence for the Ayutthaya Kingdom from Toungoo.
1594	Eighty Years' War and Anglo-Spanish War	Siege of Groningen	(Netherlands)	19 May—22 July	The Netherlands and England capture Groningen from Spain.
1594	Sinhalese–Portuguese conflicts	Campaign of Danture	(Sri Lanka)	5 July—9 Oct	Kingdom of Kandy stops Portuguese incursion into Sri Lanka.
1594	Siamese–Cambodian War (1591–1594)	Fall of Longvek	(Cambodia)		Ayutthaya Kingdom victory over Kingdom of Cambodia, sacking their capital of Longvek.
1594	Scottish clan feuds	Battle of Glenlivet	(Scotland)	3 Oct	Religious clan battle.
1594	Anglo-Spanish War and Succession of Henry IV of France	Siege of Fort Crozon	(France)	13 Oct—19 Nov	England and France capture a Spanish fort, used as an outpost for naval attacks on England.
1595	Battle of Rajahmundry		(India)		A battle fought during the reign of Muhammad Quli Qutub Shah.
1595	Franco-Spanish War	Battle of Fontaine-Française	(France)	5 June	King Henry IV of France defeats Spain and the French Catholic League.
1595	Eighty Years' War and Anglo-Spanish War	Siege of Groenlo	(Netherlands)	14–24 July	The Netherlands and England fail to capture Groenlo from Spain.
1595	Long Turkish War	Battle of Călugăreni	(Romania)	23 Aug	Wallachia defeats the Ottoman Empire.
1595	Eighty Years' War	Battle of the Lippe	(Germany)	3 Sep	Spain defeats The Netherlands and England.
1595	Long Turkish War	Battle of Giurgiu	(Romania)	27-30 Oct	Transylvania, Wallachia, Moldavia and the Holy Roman Empire defeat the Ottoman Empire.
1595	Anglo-Spanish War	Battle of Guadelupe Island	(France)	8 Nov	The Spanish navy defeats England.
1595	Anglo-Spanish War	Battle of San Juan	(United States)	8 Nov	The Spanish navy defeats England.
1596	Anglo-Spanish War	Battle of Pinos	(Cuba)	11 March	The Spanish navy defeats England.
1596	Franco-Spanish War and Anglo-Spanish War	Siege of Calais	(France)	8–24 April	Spain captures Calais from France.
1596	Anglo-Spanish War	Capture of Cádiz	(Spain)	30 June—15 July	Anglo-Dutch forces seize the Spanish city of Cádiz.
1596	Hundred Years' Croatian–Ottoman War	Battle of Brest, Croatia	(Croatia)	19 Sep	Croatian army defeats forces of the Ottoman Empire forcing the latter to lift the siege of Petrinja.
1596	Long Turkish War	Battle of Keresztes	(Hungary)	24-26 Oct	Ottoman Empire defeats Austria-Hungary and Germany.
1597	Eighty Years' War and Anglo-Spanish War	Battle of Turnhout	(Belgium)	24 Jan	Dutch troops defeat Spanish cavalry
1597	Franco-Spanish War and Anglo-Spanish War	Siege of Amiens	(France)	13 May—25 Sep	France and England defeat Spain.
1597	Eighty Years' War and Anglo-Spanish War	Siege of Rheinberg	(Germany)	9-19 Aug	The Netherlands and England capture Rheinberg from Spain.
1597	Imjin War	Battle of Chilcheollyang	(South Korea)	28 Aug	Japanese Navy decisively defeat Korean Navy
1597	Eighty Years' War	Siege of Groenlo	(Netherlands)	11–28 Sep	The Netherlands and England capture Groenlo from Spain.
1597	War against Sigismund	Siege of Turku Castle	(Finland)	11-30 Sep	Duke Charles IX of Sweden annexes castle from the Polish-Lithuanian Commonwealth.
1597	Imjin War	Siege of Namwon	(South Korea)	23-26 Sep	Japanese defeat Korean and Chinese alliance force
1597	Eighty Years' War	Siege of Bredevoort	(Netherlands)	1-10 Oct	The Netherlands and England capture Bredevoort from Spain.
1597	Imjin War	Battle of Jiksan	(South Korea)	Ming Chinese defeat Japan.	
1597	Imjin War	Battle of Myeongnyang	(South Korea)	26 Oct	Korean Navy defeats Japanese navy
1598	Imjin War	Siege of Ulsan	(South Korea)	29 Jan—19 Feb	Japanese defeat Korean and Chinese alliance force.
1598		Siege of Kojur	(Iran)		Abbas the Great besieges and captures the Baduspanid city of Kojur in retaliation for the death of two prominent Safavid nobles.
1598	Anglo-Spanish War	Battle of San Juan	(Puerto Rico)	15–30 June	England defeats Spain in Puerto Rico and takes their castle, they retreat 65 days later but burn San Juan to the ground.
1598	Persian-Uzbek Wars	Battle of Herat	(Afghanistan)	9 Aug	Safavids decisively defeat Khanate of Bukhara, retaking Khorosan.
1598	Nine Years' War	Battle of the Yellow Ford	(Northern Ireland)	14 Aug	Irish under Hugh O'Neill, earl of Tyrone, destroy English force.
1598	War against Sigismund	Battle of Stegeborg	(Sweden)	18 Sep	Sigismund III defeats his rebelling uncle, Duke Charles.
1598	War against Sigismund	Battle of Stångebro	(Sweden)	25 Sep	Sigismund III loses the Swedish crown to his uncle, Duke Charles.
1598		Siege of Rheinberg	(Germany)	2-14 Oct	Spain captures Rheinberg from the Netherlands.
1598	Imjin War	Battle of Sacheon	(South Korea)	6-11 Nov	Japanese army defeats Korean army.
1598	Imjin War	Battle of Noryang Point	(South Korea)	16 Dec	Ming Chinese and Korean Navy decisively defeat the Japanese army.
1598	Arauco War	Battle of Curalaba	(Chile)	23 Dec	The Mapuche defeat Spain.
1599		Battle of Jenné	(Mali)	26 April	Saadi dynasty of Morocco decisively defeats the Mali Empire, leading to its collapse.
1599	Eighty Years' War and Anglo-Spanish War	Siege of Schenckenschans	(Germany)	28 April—May	Spain fails to capture Schenkenschanz from The Netherlands.
1599	Eighty Years' War and Anglo-Spanish War	Siege of Zaltbommel	(Netherlands)	15 May—22 July	Spain fails to capture Zaltbommel from The Netherlands.
1599	Nine Years' War	Battle of Curlew Pass	(Republic of Ireland)	15 Aug	Irish forces defeat the English.
1599	War against Sigismund	Battle of S:t Mårtens	(Finland)	29 Aug	Charles IX of Sweden defeats the forces of Axel Kurck.
1599	Eighty Years' War and Anglo-Spanish War	Siege of Rees	(Germany)	10-12 Sep	A Protestant German army and a Dutch army fail to capture Rees from Spain.
1599	War against Sigismund	Siege of Viborg	(Russia)	21-23 Sep	Charles IX of Sweden annexes Vyborg from Poland-Lithuania.
1599	Long Turkish War	Battle of Șelimbăr	(Romania)	18 Oct	Michael the Brave, Prince of Wallachia, defeats the army of prince Andrew Báthory of Transylvania.
1599	Georgian–Ottoman Wars	Battle of Nakhiduri	(Georgia (country))		An invading Ottoman army defeats and captures the King Simon I of Kartli.
1600	War of the Straits	Battle of Castro	(Chile)	May	Spain defeats The Netherlands and Mapuche and reconquers Chiloé Island.
1600	Eighty Years' War	Battle of Nieuwpoort	(Belgium)	2 July	Battle between Dutch (led by Prince Maurits) and Spanish army, led by Albrecht, archduke of Austria. Dutch victory.
1600	Long Turkish War	Battle of Mirăslău	(Romania)	18 Sep	The Holy Roman Empire and Hungarian nobility defeat Wallachia.
1600	Moldavian Magnate Wars	Battle of Bucov	(Romania)	20 Oct	Poland-Lithuania and Moldavia defeat Wallachia.
1600	Sekigahara Campaign	Battle of Sekigahara	(Japan)	21 Oct	Japanese General Ieyasu defeats three regents of the son of Hideyoshi in the most important battle in Japanese history – he later establishes the Tokugawa Shogunate.
