= 1568 =

1568 in various calendars
- Gregorian calendar: 1568; MDLXVIII
- Ab urbe condita: 2321
- Armenian calendar: 1017; ԹՎ ՌԺԷ
- Assyrian calendar: 6318
- Balinese saka calendar: 1489–1490
- Bengali calendar: 974–975
- Berber calendar: 2518
- English Regnal year: 10 Eliz. 1 – 11 Eliz. 1
- Buddhist calendar: 2112
- Burmese calendar: 930
- Byzantine calendar: 7076–7077
- Chinese calendar: 丁卯年 (Fire Rabbit); 4265 or 4058 — to — 戊辰年 (Earth Dragon); 4266 or 4059
- Coptic calendar: 1284–1285
- Discordian calendar: 2734
- Ethiopian calendar: 1560–1561
- Hebrew calendar: 5328–5329
- Hindu calendars
- Vikram Samvat: 1624–1625
- Shaka Samvat: 1489–1490
- Kali Yuga: 4668–4669
- Holocene calendar: 11568
- Igbo calendar: 568–569
- Iranian calendar: 946–947
- Islamic calendar: 975–976
- Japanese calendar: Eiroku 11 (永禄１１年)
- Javanese calendar: 1487–1488
- Julian calendar: 1568; MDLXVIII
- Korean calendar: 3901
- Minguo calendar: 344 before ROC 民前344年
- Nanakshahi calendar: 100
- Thai solar calendar: 2110–2111
- Tibetan calendar: མེ་མོ་ཡོས་ལོ་ (female Fire-Hare); 1694 or 1313 or 541 — to — ས་ཕོ་འབྲུག་ལོ་ (male Earth-Dragon); 1695 or 1314 or 542

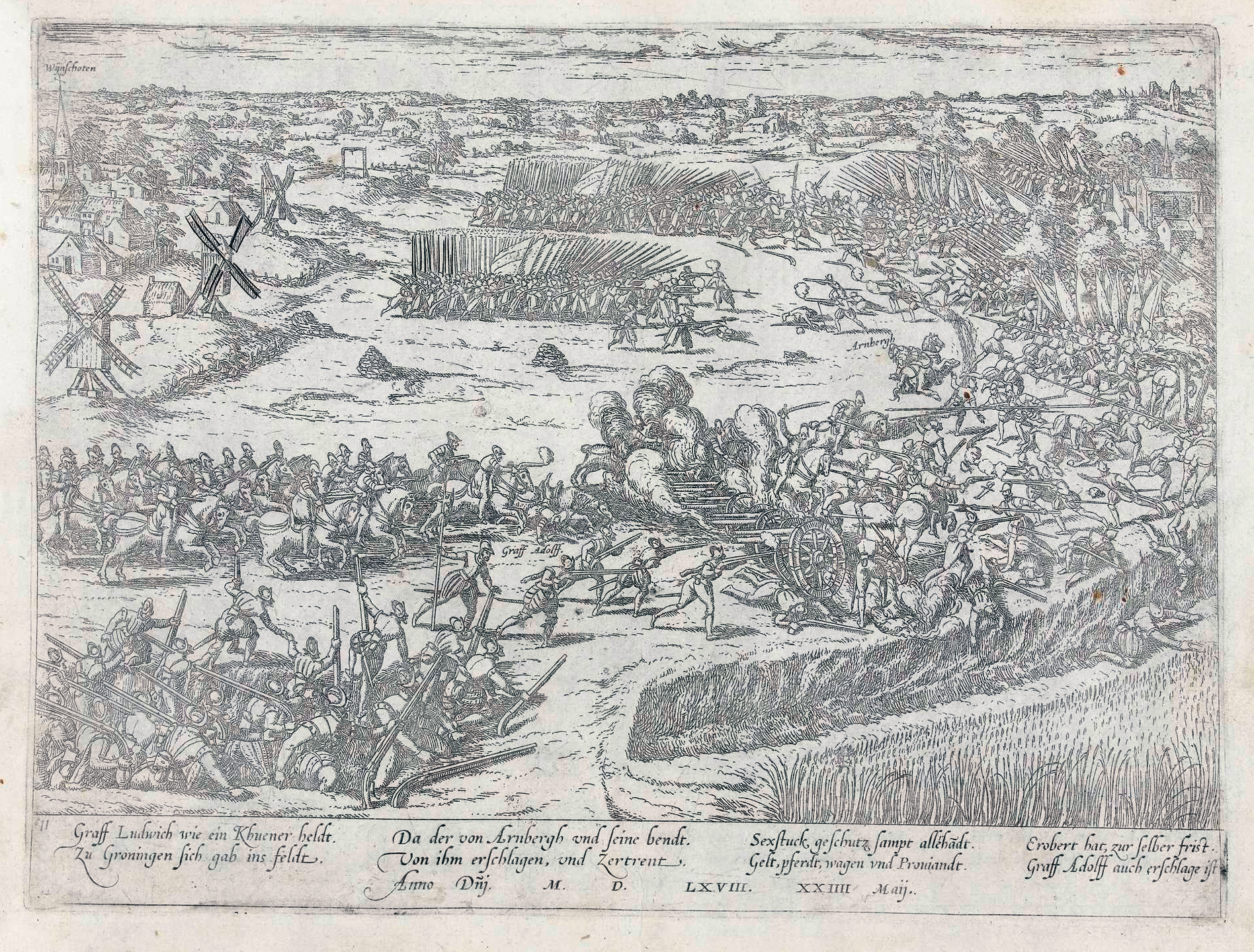
May 23: Battle of Heiligerlee

Year 1568 (MDLXVIII) was a leap year starting on Thursday of the Julian calendar.

== Events ==
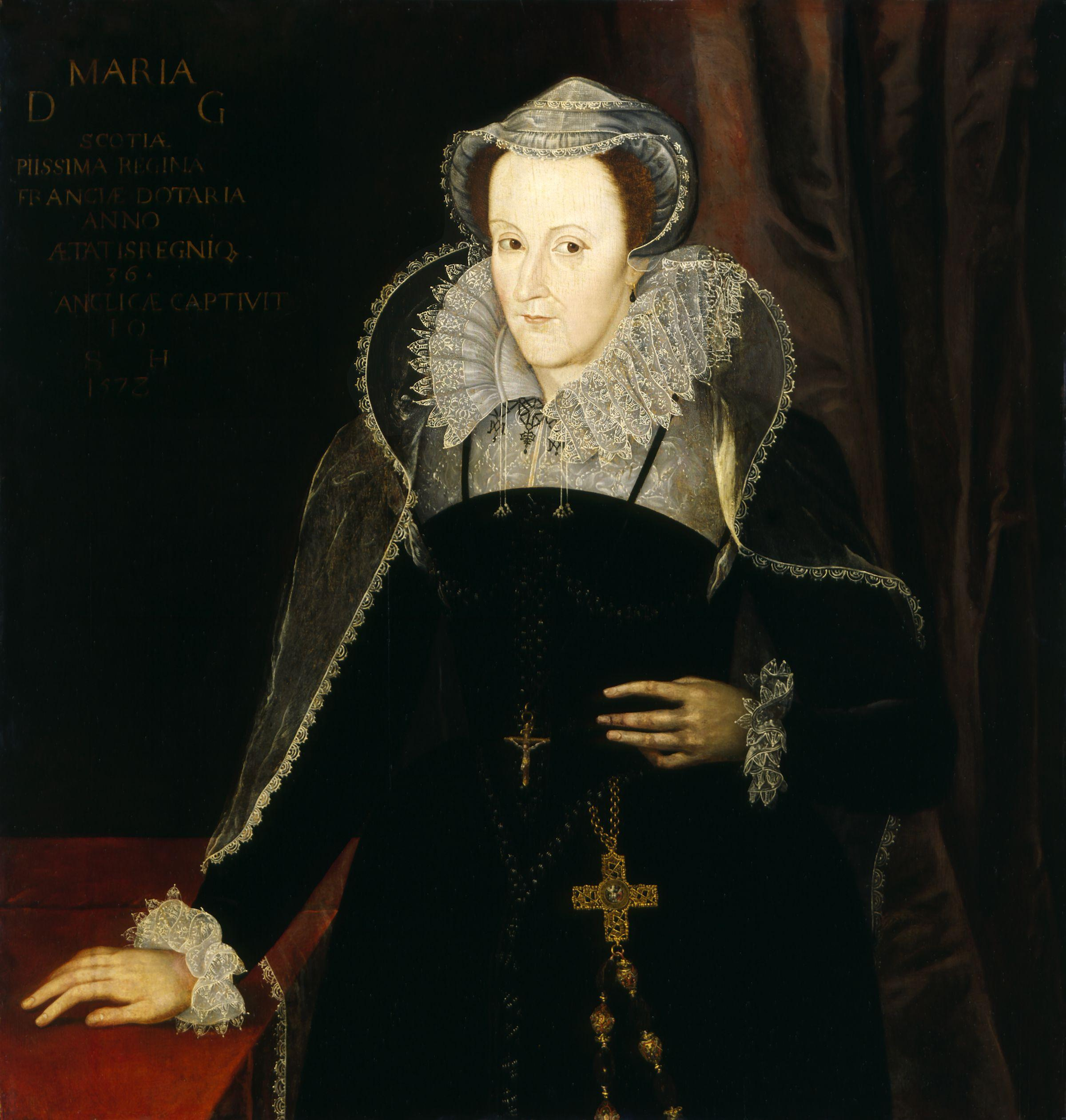
May: Mary, Queen of Scots, flees to England.

=== January–March ===
- January 6 – In the Eastern Hungarian Kingdom, the delegates of Unio Trium Nationum to the Diet of Torda convene in a session that ends on January 13, during which freedom of religion is debated.
- January 28 – The Edict of Torda, Europe's first declaration of religious freedom, is adopted by the Kingdom of Hungary.
- February 7 – Members of a Spanish expedition, commanded by Álvaro de Mendaña de Neira, become the first Europeans to see the Solomon Islands, landing at Santa Isabel Island.
- February 16 – Fernando Álvarez de Toledo, 3rd Duke of Alba, governor of the Spanish Netherlands issues an edict condemning to death those who rebel against Spanish authority to combat religious unrest.
- February 17 – Treaty of Adrianople (sometimes called the Peace of Adrianople): The Habsburgs agree to pay tribute to the Ottomans.
- February 23 – Akbar the Great of the Mughal Empire captures the massive Chittor Fort in northern India from the Kingdom of Mewar after the Siege of Chittorgarh that began on October 23, 1567.
- February 28 – French Huguenots begin the Siege of Chartres, but fail to take the walled city after 15 days.
- March 23 – The Peace of Longjumeau ends the Second War of Religion in France. Again Catherine de' Medici and Charles IX make substantial concessions to the Huguenots.

=== April–June ===
- April 23 – Eighty Years' War: The Battle of Dahlen takes place in the Duchy of Jülich near the modern-day Rheindahlen borough in the German city of Mönchengladbach, North Rhine-Westphalia. Spanish troops, commanded by Sancho d'Avila, overwhelm a larger force of Dutch rebels led by Jean de Montigny, Lord of Villers.
- May 2 – The deposed Mary, Queen of Scots, escapes from Lochleven Castle.
- May 13 – Marian civil war in Scotland: Battle of Langside – The forces of Mary, Queen of Scots, are defeated by a confederacy of Scottish Protestants under James Stewart, 1st Earl of Moray, regent of Scotland and her half-brother.
- May 16 – Mary, Queen of Scots, flees across the Solway Firth from Scotland to England but on May 19 is placed in custody in Carlisle Castle on the orders of Queen Elizabeth I, her cousin.
- May 23 – Battle of Heiligerlee: Troops under Louis of Nassau, brother of William the Silent, defeat a smaller loyalist force under Jean de Ligne, in an attempt to invade the Northern Netherlands. This effectively begins the Eighty Years' War.
- June 1 – A mass execution is carried out in the Spanish Netherlands at Sablon, near Brussels, as 18 persons who signed the Compromise of Nobles on April 5, 1566, are beheaded.
- June 13 – Thomas Lancaster is consecrated as the Archbishop of Armagh, spiritual leader of the Church of Ireland, succeeding Archbishop Adam Loftus.
- June 27 – Ottoman pirate Kılıç Ali Pasha, formerly Italian farmer Giovanni Dionigi Galeni, is appointed as the Ottoman Beylerbey of Ottoman Algeria by the Sultan Selim II.

=== July–September ===
- July 21 – Battle of Jemmingen: The main Spanish army of the Duke of Alba utterly defeats Louis of Nassau's invading army in the Northeastern Netherlands.
- August 18 – The Third War of Religion begins in France, after an unsuccessful attempt by the Royalists to capture Louis I, Prince of Condé and Gaspard II de Coligny, the Huguenot leaders.
- September 24 – Battle of San Juan de Ulúa (Anglo-Spanish War): In the Gulf of Mexico, a Spanish fleet forces English privateers under John Hawkins to end their campaign.
- September 29 – The Swedish king Eric XIV is deposed by his half-brothers John and Charles. John proclaims himself king John III the next day.

=== October–December ===
- October 5 – William the Silent invades the southeastern Netherlands.
- October 18 — Ashikaga Yoshiaki is installed as Shōgun, beginning the Azuchi–Momoyama period in Japan.
- October 20 – Battle of Jodoigne: Spanish forces under the Duke of Alba destroy William the Silent's rearguard and William abandons his offensive.
- November 12 – Dutch rebels commanded by William the Silent defeat Spanish Habsburg troops led by Sancho d'Avila in the battle of Le Quesnoy in northern France.
- November 22 – The second treaty of Roskilde is signed between representatives of the Kingdom of Denmark and the Kingdom of Sweden to end the Northern Seven Years' War. Sweden cedes the Duchy of Estonia (Estland) to Danish control.
- November 27 – Burmese–Siamese War: Dispatched by King Bayinnaung, 55,000 Burmese troops arrive at Phitsanulok (in modern-day Thailand) and drive back the attack by armies from the Ayutthaya Kingdom (Thailand) and Lan Xang (Laos), then prepare to invade Ayutthaya to put down the rebellion by Ayutthayan King Maha Chakkraphat
- December 24 – The Morisco Revolt against King Philip II of Spain begins as Aben Humeya (formerly Fernando de Válor) is proclaimed as King of the Granadan rebels.
- December 28 – Ludwig III becomes the Duke of Württemberg in German Bavaria after the death of his father, Christoph.

=== Date unknown ===
- The Russo-Turkish War begins in Astrakhan.
- Álvaro I succeeds his stepfather Henrique I as ruler of the Kingdom of Kongo forming the Kwilu dynasty that rules the kingdom without interruption until May 1622.
- Polybius' Histories are first translated into English, by Christopher Watson.

== Births ==
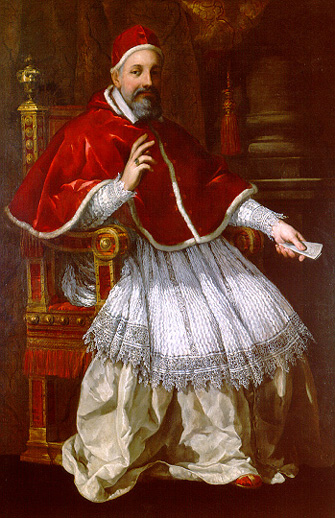
Pope Urban VIII

- January 6 – Henri Spondanus, French historian (d. 1643)
- January 14 – Johannes Hartmann, German chemist (d. 1631)
- January 20 – Daniel Cramer, German theologian (d. 1637)
- January 28 – Gustav of Sweden, Swedish prince (d. 1607)
- January 30 – Katharina of Hanau-Lichtenberg, countess (d. 1636)
- February 2 – Péter Révay, Hungarian historian (d. 1622)
- February 11 – Honoré d'Urfé, French writer (d. 1625)
- March 9 – Aloysius Gonzaga, Italian Jesuit and saint (d. 1591)
- March 16 – Juan Martínez Montañés, Spanish sculptor (d. 1649)
- March 28 – Johannes Polyander, Dutch theologian (d. 1646)
- March 30 – Henry Wotton, English author and diplomat (d. 1639)
- April 5 – Pope Urban VIII (d. 1644)
- April 17 – George Brooke, English aristocrat (d. 1603)
- April 21 – Frederick II, Duke of Holstein-Gottorp (d. 1587)
- April 28 – Teodósio II, Duke of Braganza, Portuguese nobleman and father of João IV of Portugal (d. 1630)
- May 9 – Guglielmo Caccia, Italian painter (d. 1625)
- May 11 – Christian I, Prince of Anhalt-Bernburg, German prince of the House of Ascania (d. 1630)
- May 17 – Anna Vasa of Sweden, Swedish princess (d. 1625)
- May 29 – Virginia de' Medici, Duchess of Modena and Reggio (d. 1615)
- June 6 – Sophie of Brandenburg, Regent of Saxony (1591–1601) (d. 1622)
- June 25 – Gunilla Bielke, Queen of Sweden (d. 1597)
- July 1 – Philip Sigismund of Brunswick-Wolfenbüttel, German Catholic bishop (d. 1623)
- August 27 – Hercule, Duke of Montbazon (d. 1654)
- September 3 – Adriano Banchieri, Italian composer (d. 1634)
- September 5 – Tommaso Campanella, Italian theologian and poet (d. 1639)
- October 2 – Marino Ghetaldi, Croatian mathematician and physicist (d. 1626)
- October 18 – Henry Wallop, English politician (d. 1642)
- November 18 – Augustus the Elder, Duke of Brunswick-Lüneburg, Lutheran Bishop of Ratzeburg (d. 1636)
- December 17 – Jonathan Trelawny, English politician (d. 1604)
- date unknown
  - Nikolaus Ager, French botanist (d. 1634)
  - John Welsh of Ayr, Scottish Presbyterian leader
  - Edward Chichester, 1st Viscount Chichester (d. 1648)
  - Nakagawa Hidemasa, Japanese military leader (d. 1592)
  - Fernando de Alva Cortés Ixtlilxóchitl, Mexican historian (d. 1648)
  - Gervase Markham, English poet and writer (d. 1637)
  - Robert Wintour, English conspirator (executed 1606)
  - Wei Zhongxian, Grand Secretary of China (d. 1627)
  - Ōtsu Ono, Japanese woman poet, koto, and writer (believed to have learned how to write from Nobutada Konoe) (d. 1631)

== Deaths ==
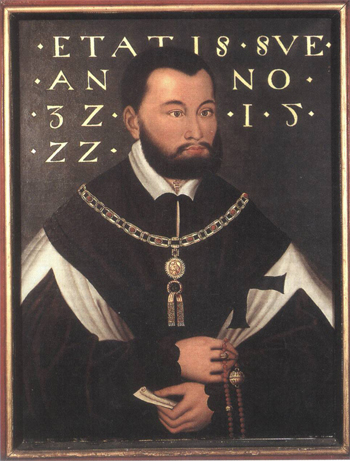
Albert, Duke of Prussia

- January 26 – Lady Catherine Grey, Countess of Hertford (b. 1540)
- February 15 – Hendrick van Brederode, Dutch reformer (b. 1531)
- March 19 – Elizabeth Seymour, Lady Cromwell, English noblewoman (b.c. 1518)
- March 20 (plague)
  - Albert, Duke of Prussia (b. 1490)
  - Anna Marie of Brunswick-Lüneburg, Duchess of Prussia (b. 1532)
- May 23 – Adolf of Nassau, Count of Nassau, Dutch soldier (b. 1540)
- April 7 – Onofrio Panvinio, Italian Augustinian historian (b. 1529)
- April 27 – Giovanni Michele Saraceni, Italian Catholic cardinal (b. 1498)
- May 6 – Bernardo Salviati, Italian Catholic cardinal (b. 1508)
- May 15 – Anna of Lorraine (b. 1522)
- May 23 – Jean de Ligne (b. 1528)
- June 3 – Andrés de Urdaneta, Spanish explorer (b. 1508)
- June 5
  - Lamoral, Count of Egmont, Flemish statesman (b. 1522)
  - Philip de Montmorency, Count of Horn (b. c. 1524)
- June 11 – Henry V, Duke of Brunswick-Lüneburg and Prince of Wolfenbüttel 1514–1568 (b. 1489)
- July 1 – Levinus Lemnius, Dutch writer (b. 1505)
- July 6 – Johannes Oporinus, Swiss printer (b. 1507)
- July 7 – William Turner, British ornithologist and botanist (b. 1508)
- July 24 – Carlos, Prince of Asturias, son of Philip II of Spain (b. 1545)
- August 15 – Stanislaus Kostka, Polish saint (b. 1550)
- August 21 – Jean Parisot de Valette, 49th Grandmaster of the Knights Hospitaller (b. 1495)
- August 23 – Thomas Wharton, 1st Baron Wharton (b. 1495)
- September 26 – Leonor de Cisneros, Spanish Protestant (b. 1536)
- September – Anna Pehrsönernas moder, influential Swedish courtier (b. year unknown)
- September 22 – Jöran Persson, Swedish politician (b. c. 1530) (executed)
- October 3 – Elisabeth of Valois, Queen of Philip II of Spain (b. 1545)
- October 14 – Jacques Arcadelt, Flemish composer (b. 1504)
- October 19 – Joannes Aurifaber Vratislaviensis, German theologian (b. 1517)
- October 28 – Ashikaga Yoshihide, Japanese shōgun (b. 1538)
- November 6 – Anna of Brunswick-Lüneburg, duchess consort of Pomerania (b. 1502)
- November 9 – John Radcliffe, English politician (b. 1539)
- December 23 – Roger Ascham, tutor of Elizabeth I of England (b. 1515)
- December 24 – Henry V, Burgrave of Plauen (b. 1533)
- December 28 – Christoph, Duke of Württemberg (b. 1515)
- December 31 – Shimazu Tadayoshi, Japanese warlord (b. 1493)
- date unknown
  - Garcia de Orta, Portuguese Jewish physician (b. 1501)
  - Dirk Philips, early Dutch Anabaptist writer and theologian (b. 1504)
  - Yan Song, Chinese prime minister (b. 1481)
  - Amato Lusitano, Portuguese physician (b. 1511)
