= Capture of Valkenburg (1574) =

1574 siege

- Part of the Eighty Years' War
Date	Early February 1574
Location	Valkenburg, South Holland, Low Countries (present-day the Netherlands) 52°10′47″N 4°25′54″E
Result	Spanish victory

Belligerents
Dutch rebels	Spain

Commanders and leaders
Edward Chester	(Spain) Francisco de Valdés

The Capture of Valkenburg of 1574, took place in early February 1574, at Valkenburg, South Holland (present-day the Netherlands), during the Eighty Years' War and the Anglo-Spanish War (1585–1604), in the context of the siege of Leiden. The fortress of Valkenburg (northwest of Leiden), garrisoned by five companies of English volunteers commanded by Colonel Edward Chester, was of strategic importance to facilitate (or complicate) the Spanish efforts at Leiden. In early February, when the Spanish troops (sent by Maestre de Campo Don Francisco de Valdés) advanced over Valkenburg Castle, the English troops surrendered the fortress to the Spaniards and fled towards Leiden. Then, the Spanish forces entered and took possession of the fortress. For the cowardice demonstrated at Valkenburg, the English troops were rejected by the Dutch rebel army at Leiden, and finally Chester's troops surrendered to the Spanish army.

Soon after, the English forces at Alphen (now called Alphen aan den Rijn, southwest Leiden), were defeated as well, and at Gouda, another English force was surprised and defeated by a contingent of Spanish troops, with the loss of 300 men and three colours for the English.

In April 1574, Francisco de Valdés halted the siege of Leiden, to face the invading rebel army led by Louis of Nassau and Henry of Nassau-Dillenburg (brothers of Prince William of Orange), but the Spanish forces commanded by General Don Sancho d'Avila reached them first, leading to the Battle of Mookerheyde. The Dutch suffered a disastrous defeat, losing at least 3,000 men, with both Louis and Henry killed. Finally, the rebel army dispersed due to lack of pay.

== See also ==
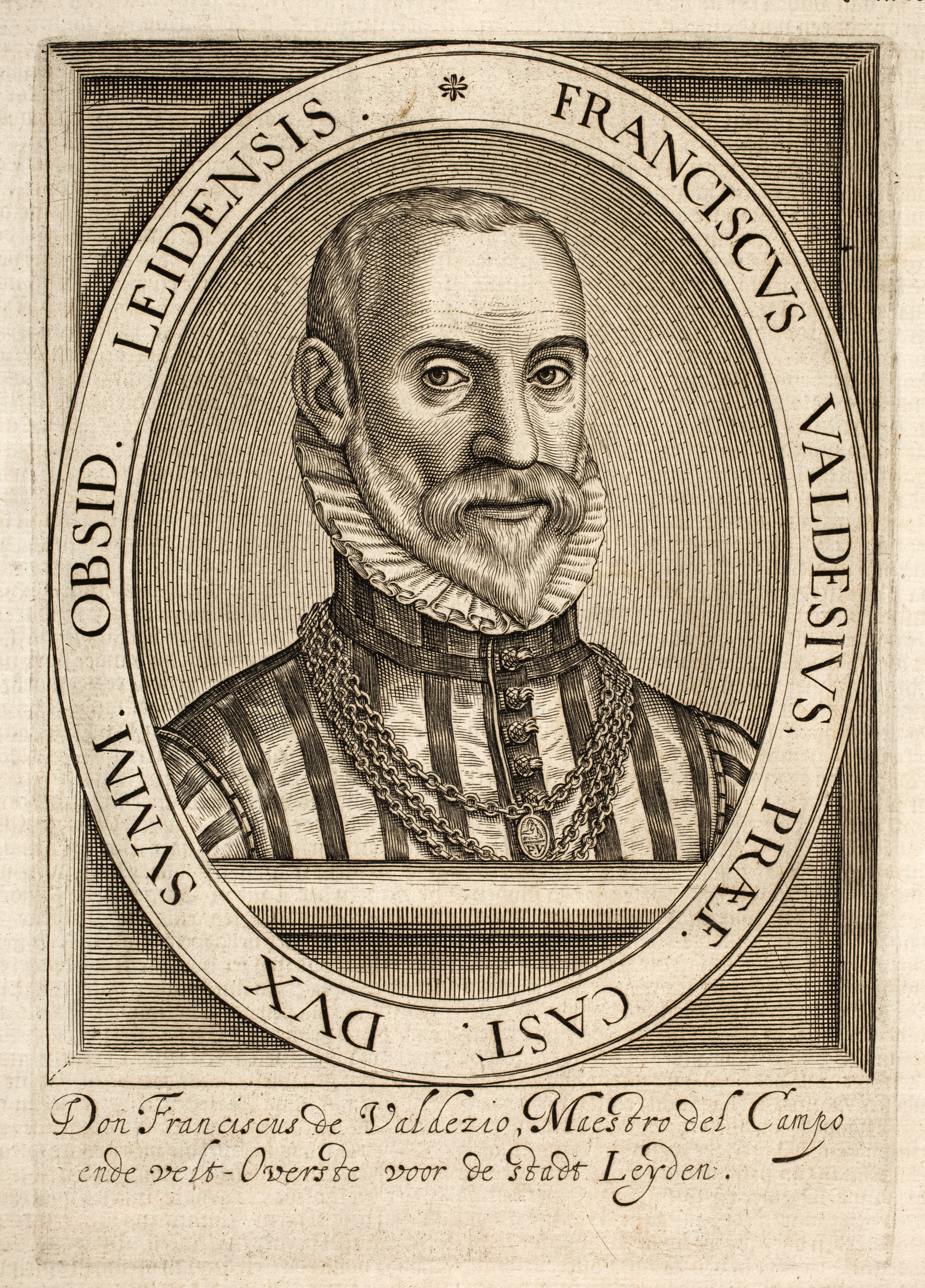
Portrait of Don Francisco de Valdés. Engraving by Emanuel van Meteren.

- Siege of Leiden
- Battle of Reimerswaal
- Battle of Mookerheyde
- States-General of the Netherlands
- List of governors of the Spanish Netherlands
