= Battle of Jodoigne =

1568 battle of the Dutch Revolt

Coordinates: 50°43′N 4°52′E

Battle of the River Guete or Battle of Jodoigne
- Part of the Dutch Revolt
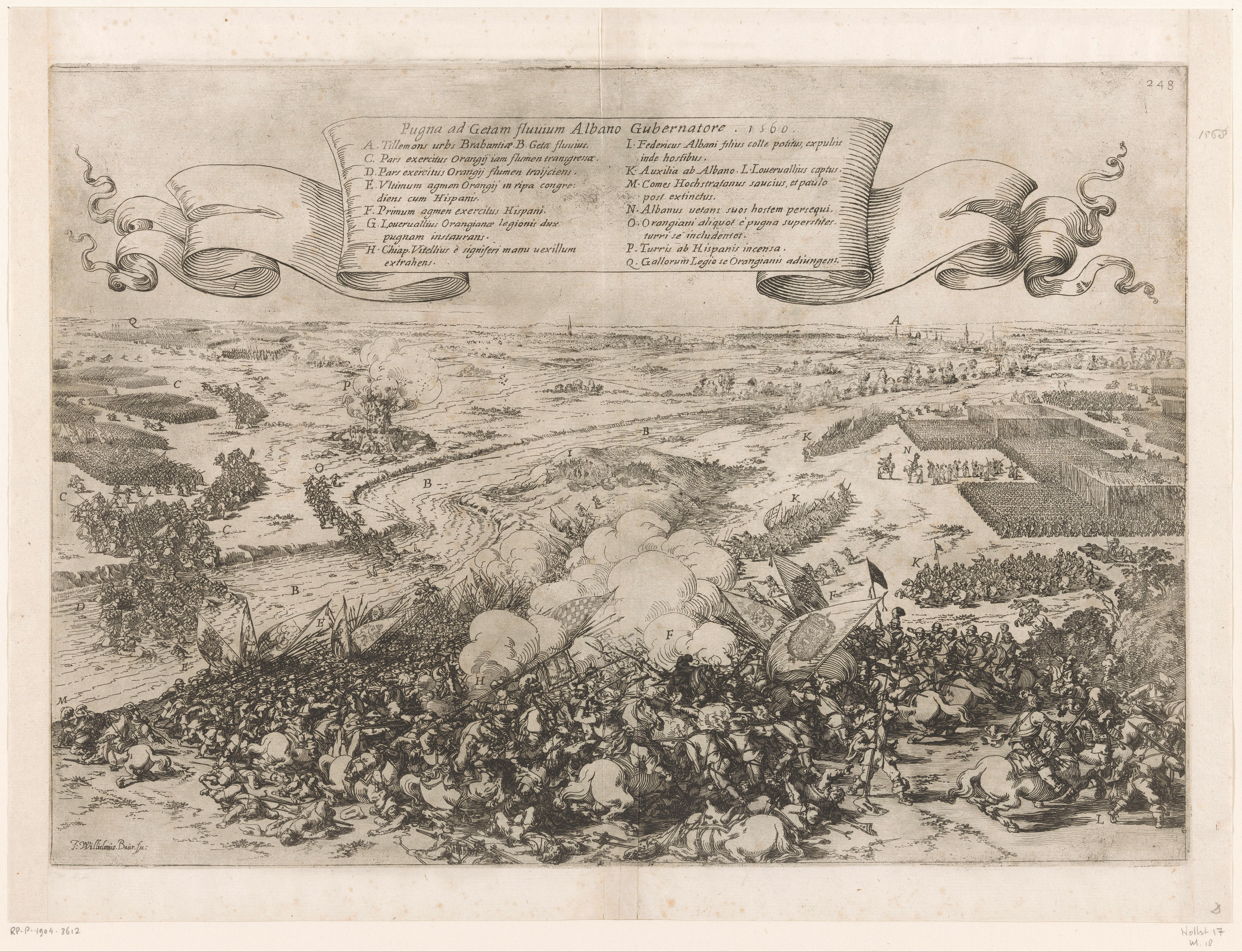
- Engraving of the Battle of the River Guete (Rome, 1632)
Date	20 October 1568
Location	Jodoigne, Spanish Netherlands (present-day Belgium)
Result	Spanish victory

Belligerents
Spanish Empire	Dutch rebels

Commanders and leaders
(Spanish Empire) Duke of Alba	William of Orange

Strength
16,000 infantry 5,500 cavalry Engaged; 2,000 infantry 1,000 cavalry 6 pieces artillery	21,000 infantry 9,000 cavalry Engaged; 2,000 infantry 500 cavalry

Casualties and losses
80 dead	More than 2,000 dead

The Battle of Jodoigne, also called Battle of the River Guete, was fought on 20 October 1568 between the royal Habsburg army led by the Duke of Alba and a Protestant rebel army led by William of Orange. It resulted in a defeat for William of Orange, who had to abandon his plans of invading the Habsburg Netherlands.

== Background ==
In 1568, the Dutch Revolt had developed into war. During the summer, Louis and Adolf of the House of Orange had fought the Spanish, won the Battle of Heiligerlee, and then lost the Battle of Jemmingen. Prince William of Orange set out to do better in the autumn, by raising a substantial army and invading the Spanish Netherlands. Since his victory in July at Jemmingen, the Spanish commander Fernando Alvarez de Toledo, Duke of Alba (or Alva) had enforced military discipline on the cities of the Netherlands, so even with Protestant leanings there would be little welcome for Orange's army.

== Campaign ==
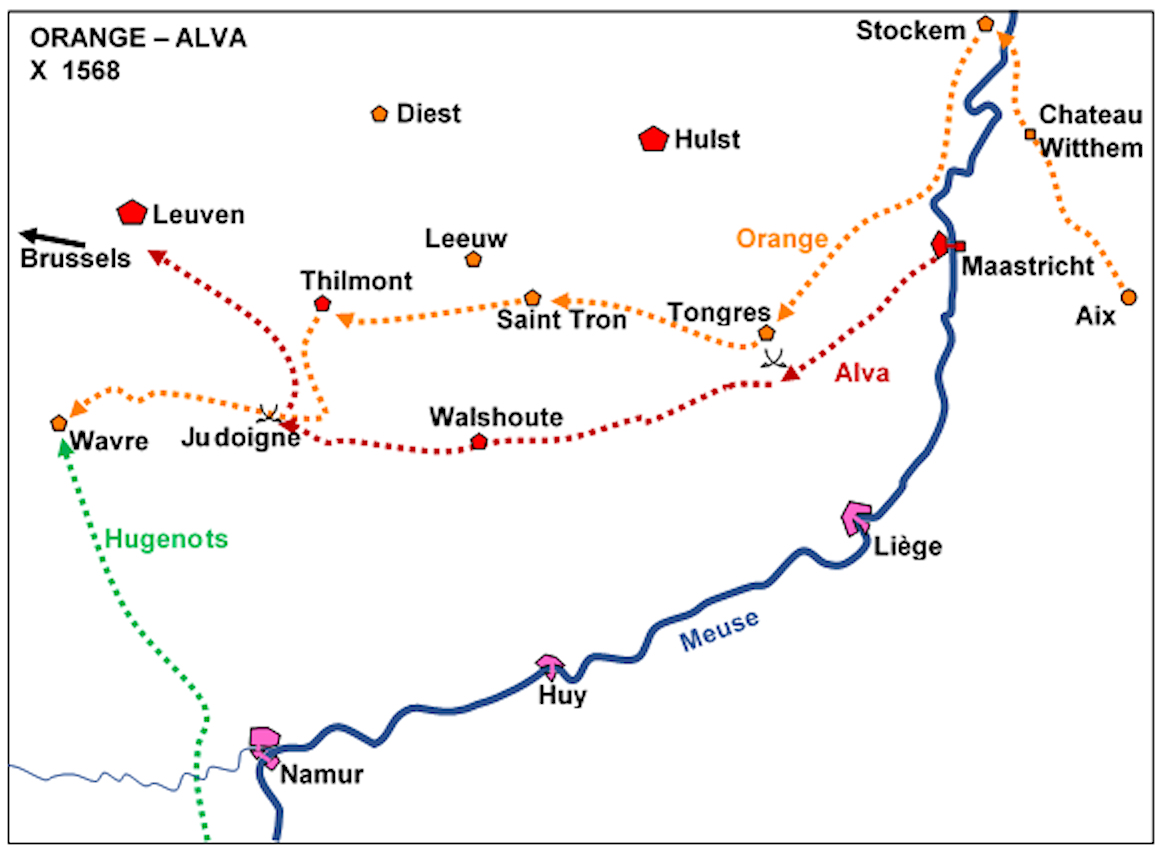
Campaign Map of Prince of Orange vs Duke of Alva October 1568

Prince William of Orange assembled his army at Aix (now Vaalserberg, French mont de Vaals) while the prince and his dignitaries met in Chateau Withem (Now Wittem, Dutch: Kasteel van Wittem). Setting off on 5 October, the army crossed the river Meuse during the night and on 6 October they occupied the fortified town of Stockem (or Stockheim, now part of Dilsen-Stokkem). The next day, the fortified town of Tongres (Now Tongeren, Walloon: Tongue, Dutch: Tongeren, German: Tongern) also opened the gates to Orange.
Orange's army included German 16,000 foot, 8,000 horse, and French and Low Dutch 2,000 foot and 2,000 horse. The commanders included Orange and his brother Louis, Casimire son of Palsgrame, Count Suarzemburg, two dukes of Saxony: Count Hochstrat and William Lume, and one of the Counts de Marca. Troops in his force include those of Canon Philippe de la Marek, brother of William II de la Marck, Baron of Lummen, Jean d'Haultepenne, Lord Barvéa, Baron of Brandenburg, the young Lord of Haneiïe, Seigneur de Lavaux-Sainte-Anne Everard de Merode, Seigneur du Val, the Lord of Bétho, master of his artillery Guillaume de Prez (also known as de Barchon), quarter-master André Bourlette, Philippe de Neuliorge, Érard Spirinck, Edmond de Marne, his brother Hubert, Bernard de Haccourt, and Guillaume de Crahain.

The problem for Orange was supplies. The small cities that did yield were insufficient to sustain the large army. He had hoped to support his army with supplies from Protestant Germany, that would pass through Liège. However, the Prince-Bishop of Liège, Gerard van Groesbeeck, opposed any help to Orange. The burgomasters of Liège also declined to allow raising of pioneers in the area. Orange had the audacity to write to the Prince Bishop of Liège extorting 100,000 ecus, which was also declined.

On 7 October, Alva set out from Maastricht with his army. His commanders included: Don Fadrique de Toledo (Alva's son), Don Fenand de Toledo (another son of Alva), Maitre de Camp Marquis de Cetenona Chiappin Vitelli, Berlaymont, Noircarmes, Conte de Meghem, Sre Francisco d’Yvarra (sent as an advisor by the Spanish King), and De La Cressionaire. Alva sent 10 ensigns ahead to reinforce Thilmont (Now Tienen, French: Tirlemont). His main army consisted of one squadron infantry under Conte de Meghem, one under Berlaymont, and one initially under Alva’s own command, later delegated to Conte de Lalaine. The cavalry units were under their own colonels.

On 9 October, the two armies exchanged fire near Tongres.

On 10 October, Orange moved on to the fortified town of Saint Tron (Now: Sint-Truiden, French: St Trond, Limburgs: Sintruin) which, despite the presence in the city of troops sent by Liege, opened its doors. Orange pillaged the abbey of St Tron and compelled the abbot to pay twenty thousand crowns for his ransom.

Alva had ordered nearby Leeuw (now Zoutleeuw or French Léau) to send its garrison to reinforce Thilmont. That left the Leeuw fortifications defenseless, so when a foraging party led by Orange's brother Louis arrived, it had to yield.

On 12 October, in a minor skirmish, Alva attacked some stragglers of Orange's force, killing 600 of Orange’s army and capturing about 100 wagons of baggage. On 14 October, Orange's troops plundered the small village of Konichsem (or Coninxheim, now Koninksem, part of Tongres). Alva further reinforced Tirlemont with Sr de Beauvoir, 6 companies of experienced Walloons, with 700 harquebuses, plus captain Monteros with his company of Spanish mounted harquebuses, to block the road to Brussels where the Conseil d’etat was located. Duc d’Arschot commanded the defense at Brussels. Alva also called up 10 companies of Walloons under Jean de Croy, le comte du Roeulx. 15, 16, and 17 October saw more skirmishing around Tongres.

Orange was running short of funds to pay the soldiers. The result was a mutiny in which Captain Malburg was killed and Orange himself was lucky to survive as a pistol bullet lodged in the scabbard of this sword. Moving camp 29 times, Orange sought to confront Alva in a decisive battle, but failed to maneuver the enemy into battle in a particularly unfavorable position.
Alva, on his side, focused on preventing Orange from getting supplies while avoiding a pitched battle. Meanwhile, an army of Huguenots, led by Francois de Hangest Sieur de Genlis & d'Abbecourt, had crossed the Meuse near the Fortress of Charlemont (French: Fort de Charlemont), near Givet. Orange and Genlis resolved to meet near Wavre.

== Battle ==
To get to Wavre, Orange had to move his army across the river Jaulche (Dutch: Grote Gete), which was the border between the Prince-Bishopric of Liège and the Habsburg-ruled Duchy of Brabant. Although only a small river, it had steep banks and was difficult to cross. To protect his crossing, Orange set a rear-guard, near Judoigne (Now French: Jodoigne, or Dutch: Geldenaken), under the command of Colonel Philip van Marbais Lord of Louverval, including 2,000 men with fire-lock weapons and 500 horse, most were Walloons or from Gascony, chosen to keep the Spanish occupied while the main army crossed the river.

Alva caught that rear-guard decisively. Although Alva's forces numbered 16,000 the Duke only allowed the van commanded by Vitelli to engage. That was the Mondragon regiment, the cavalry companies of counts Jean Batiste de Monte, de Sansecondo, and de Nugorala, one company of cavalry of George Machuca, and the company of mounted musketeers of de Montero.

Alva also sent his son, Fadrique, with six pieces of cannon to support the attack.
Orange lost over 2,000 men and some key commanders: Count Hochstrate received a mortal wound, and died not long after, and Colonel Philip van Marbais Lord of Louverval was captured, taken to Brussels, and beheaded.

Although many of the Spanish were wounded, only 80 died.

== Aftermath ==
When Orange met Genlis, he found the Huguenot army was disappointingly small, numbering about 2,000 infantry and 500 cavalry (estimates of the total vary between 2,000 and a probably exaggerated 5,800). That was not even enough to provide a decisive advantage over Alva. Seeking a way back to Germany before the winter, Orange would be refused passage through the Prince-Bishopric of Liège. Orange and Alva would fight again at the Battle of Le Quesnoy. Orange's army would pass through France to Strasbourg, where Orange paid off most of his army. Alva took revenge on the towns that supported Orange. For example, the burgomeisters of Leeuw were sentenced to death for yielding to Louis, even though they had sent their garrison as ordered to reinforce Thilmont. His generals managed to persuade Alva that was unjust, so he commuted the sentence to executing just one of them. To the north of the campaign, the town of Diest, owned by William of Orange, had sent provisions to support Orange's army. As punishment, the town had to fund a tercio of the Army of Flanders and some years later, in 1572, the Spanish King Philip II confiscated Diest, destroying its fortifications.
