= Battle of Dahlen =

1568 Spanish-Dutch battle

- Part of the Eighty Years' War
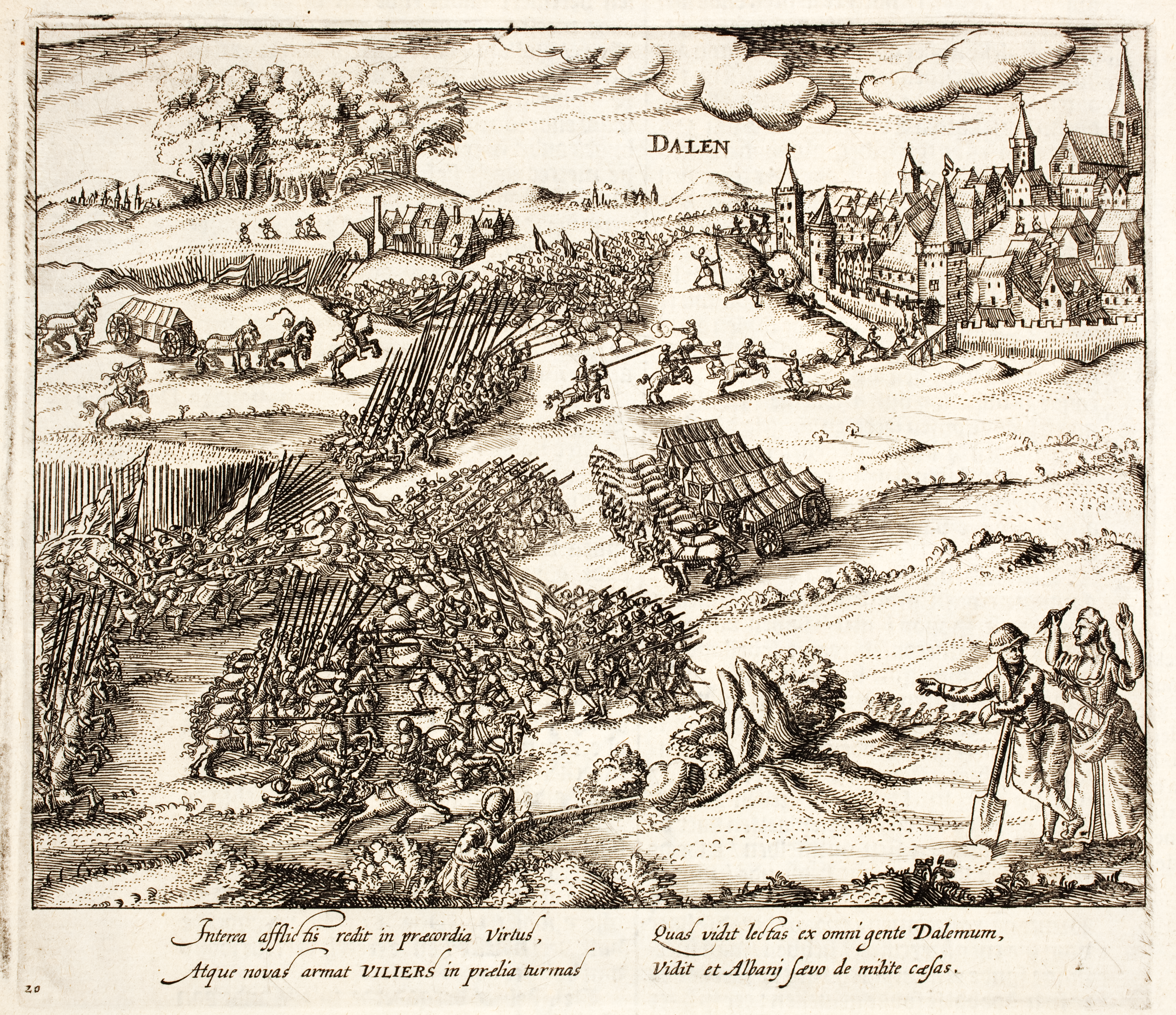
- The siege before Dalen, July 22 1568 (engraving) by Frans Hogenberg.
Date	April 25, 1568; 458 years ago
Location	Near Dahlen, Duchy of Jülich, Holy Roman Empire (present-day Germany) 51°8′N 6°22′E
Result	Spanish victory

Belligerents
Dutch rebels	(Spain) Spanish Empire

Commanders and leaders
Jean de Montigny	(Spain) Sancho d'Avila

Strength
3,000	1,600

Casualties and losses
~2,000 killed	Very few

The Battle of Dahlen was fought on April 23, 1568, between a Dutch rebel army led by Jean de Montigny, Lord of Villers, and a Spanish army commanded by Sancho Dávila y Daza. As a part of William of Orange's planned invasion, the Dutch rebels were trying to conquer the town of Roermond when the arrival of the Spanish force compelled them to withdraw. Dávila pursued the retreating force and inflicted a defeat upon Villers near the small town of Dahlen (today known as Rheindahlen). The survivors of this encounter sought refuge under the walls of Dahlen, where the Spanish infantry finally defeated them. This battle is sometimes considered the official start of the Eighty Years' War.

== Background ==
In 1568, William I of Orange, stadtholder of Holland, Zeeland, and Utrecht, and other noblemen dissatisfied with the Spanish rule in the Netherlands, the Geuzen, were determined to expel Fernando Álvarez de Toledo, 3rd Duke of Alba, and his Spanish troops from the country. William, based in Dillenburg, designed a triple attack upon the Netherlands by his rebel followers and foreign mercenary forces. An army of Huguenots and Netherlander refugees would attack Artois across the French border; another, under William's brother Louis, would try to raise the province of Friesland in arms against the Spanish; and a third one, under Antoine II de Lalaing, Count of Hoogstraten, would operate in the Meuse-Rhin area.

The first force to be put in arms was that of Hoogstraten, though he had to be replaced by Jean de Montigny, Lord of Villers, who crossed the frontier of the Jülich-Cleves County on April 20 accompanied by William II de La Marck, Lord of Lumey, and in charge of about 3,000 men, both cavalry and infantry, amongst them French Huguenots and German cavalry recently dismissed from Spanish service. Villers was expected to raise the country and take an important city to serve as a base for a large offensive. The city selected was Roermond, a fortified town of considerable size situated at the confluence of the Meuse and Rur rivers.

== Prelude ==
As soon as he received news of the invasion, Alba organized an improvised army to secure Maastricht and prevent the junction of the Dutch rebels with his French fellows. He ordered the maestre de campo don Sancho de Londoño to move his tercio from the village of Lier up to Maastricht and its neighborhood. To blockade the route linking northern France with the valley of the Meuse, the Duke mobilized most of the cavalry under his illegitimate son, Fernando de Toledo, Grand Prior of Castile, who sent his men from Tournai up to the neutral Bishopric of Liège under the command of his lieutenant, don Lope de Acuña.

Alba ordered the captain of his guard, don Sancho Dávila y Daza, to go after the rebel army with his own company of Spanish lances and those of Albanese lances under Captain Nicolò Basta, and of horse arquebusiers under Pedro Montañés. 300 horse in all, which were later reinforced with the tercio of Londoño, Lope's cavalry, and four companies of German pikemen, numbering 300 men, from Colonel's Count of Eberstein regiment, from the Maastricht garrison. In all, the small Spanish army numbered about 1,600 men.

While being searched by the Spanish, Villers and his army passed through Eijsden and advanced upon Roermond. There, they tried to enter the town pretending to be soldiers of the King of Spain, but the town's inhabitants were not fooled. Then the rebels resorted to their weapons and attempted to seize the town's gates, only to be driven off. Fearing that they would be caught by the Spanish, Villers decided to withdraw, taking the road to the Guelders exclave of Erkelenz. There were some doubts on the Spanish side about what to do then. Londoño advised caution, but Dávila decided to pursue the rebels, seeking to gain a victory that would serve as a warning for them.

== Battle ==
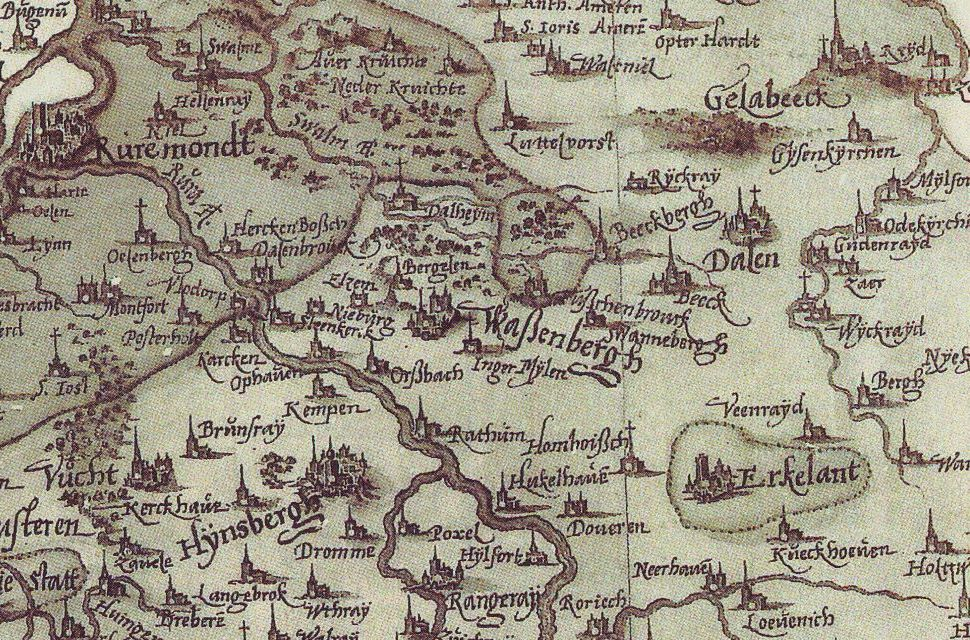
Excerpt of the manuscript atlas by Christian Sgrothen depicting the area where the battle was fought.

Sancho Dávila went ahead with his cavalry and was informed by his scouts that the rebels were close to the village of Erkelenz. There Villers found his path cut off because a nearby bridge over the Rur river had been demolished. He decided to take the road to Dahlen, a small walled town in the Duchy of Jülich, while Dávila followed him and soon discovered the rebel army on the road between the two towns.

Villers deployed his troops for the battle on a plain with some groves behind and a hollow way covering one of his flanks, and dispatched his baggage towards Dahlen as soon as he learned of Dávila's presence nearby. To distract the Spanish general, he sent some of his cavalry against him, but Dávila dispersed it and made his way through the hollow way.

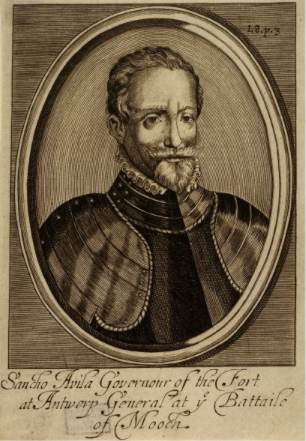
The commander of the battle of Dahlen: Sancho Dávila y Daza

After a brief reconnaissance, Dávila, together with the Count of Eberstein and the cavalry companies under captains don Alonso de Vargas and Nicolò Basta, charged across the plain and frontally lunged over the rebel squadrons, which they broke. Villers then lost most of his cavalry and two flags. He and some 1,300 men retreated in some order with part of the baggage and managed to reach Dahlen, under whose walls they entrenched to withstand a second attack.

Villers covered his men behind a ravelin of the wall, which also had a moat, and reinforced his weak flank with some baggage wagons. Sancho Dávila was unable to reach such positions with his cavalry due to the rough groves, so he called Sancho de Londoño to come rapidly with the infantry. By early afternoon, the 300 German pikemen were detached behind the ravelin to prevent any attempt to flee, while 600 Spaniards, organized in five flags and under the personal leadership of Londoño, were ready to make a frontal attack on the fort, which they did shortly thereafter.

The fight lasted half an hour, after which the Spaniards took the ravelin. Just a few rebels succeeded in escaping and sought refuge in Dahlen, climbing through the scales; the others were butchered.

== Aftermath ==
Villers was amongst those who escaped inside Dahlen, but was afterwards handed over to the Spanish. The Lord of Lumey, on the other hand, evaded capture. All the baggage, seven flags, a large number of corslets, pikes, harquebuses, other weapons, and munitions were seized by the victors. Some 2,000 rebels, most of whom were French, were killed, as opposed to light Spanish casualties. Shortly thereafter, the Spanish army was split up. Dávila went to Brussels with the foremost captives to execute them, the Count of Eberstein returned to Maastricht with his German pikemen, and Sancho de Londoño lodged his men at Roermond, where he ordered several prisoners – natives of the place–to be hanged.

A month later, Louis of Nassau scored an important victory over the Spanish at Heiligerlee. Shortly afterwards, however, the planned rebel invasion of Artois was defeated in the bailiwick of Hesdin. The local Spanish forces under the Count of Roleux drove the rebels across the French frontier. There, in Picardy, at Saint-Valery, the French royal army destroyed what remained of the Netherlander force. On July 21, Alba decisively defeated Nassau at Jemmingen, ending the Dutch rebel campaign in Friesland.

It would be many decades before the Dutch rebels finally captured Roermond, which came under the Dutch Republic's rule only in the final phase of the Eighty Years' War.

== Sources ==
- Bentivoglio, Guido (1687). Las guerras de Flandes. Antwerp: Geronymo Verdussen.
- Cabrera de Córdoba, Luis (1619). Filipe Segundo, Rey de España. Luis Sanchez.
- Carnero, Antonio (1625). Historia de las guerras ciuiles que ha auido en los estados de Flandes des del año 1559 hasta el de 1609 y las causas de la rebelion de dichos estados. Brussels: Juan de Meerbeque.
- Lothrop Motley, John (1883). The Rise of the Dutch Republic: A History. New York and London: Harper & Brothers. OCLC 631636.
