= Jemgum =

- Municipality
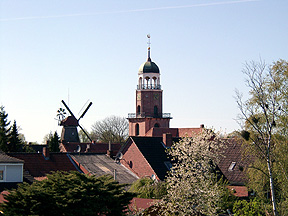
- The church and windmill of Ditzum in Jemgum municipality

- Flag Coat of arms

- Location of Jemgum within Leer district
- Interactive map of Jemgum
- Location within Germany Location within Lower Saxony
- Coordinates: 53°15′57″N 07°23′06″E
- Country: Germany
- State: Lower Saxony
- District: Leer

Government
  - Mayor (2021–26): Hans-Peter Heikens (Ind.)

Area
  - Total: 78.48 km^{2} (30.30 sq mi)
- Elevation: 0 m (0 ft)

Population (2025-12-31)
  - Total: 3,429
  - Density: 43.69/km^{2} (113.2/sq mi)
- Time zone: UTC+01:00 (CET)
  - Summer (DST): UTC+02:00 (CEST)
- Postal codes: 26844
- Dialling codes: 0 49 58
- Vehicle registration: LER
- Website: www.jemgum.de

Jemgum is a municipality in the Leer district, in the northwest of Lower Saxony, Germany. The area is known as Rheiderland (German) or Reiderland (Dutch). Rheiderland is located in East Friesland.

== History ==
Jemgum was the site of the Battle of Jemmingen on 21 July 1568, an early event of the Eighty Years' War, in which a Spanish army defeated a Dutch Rebel army under Louis of Nassau.
