= Capture of Porto =

1580 battle

- Part of the War of the Portuguese Succession
Date	24 October 1580
Location	Porto, Portugal
Result	Spanish victory

Belligerents
(Spain) Spanish Empire	Portugal

Commanders and leaders
(Spain) Sancho d'Avila	Unknown

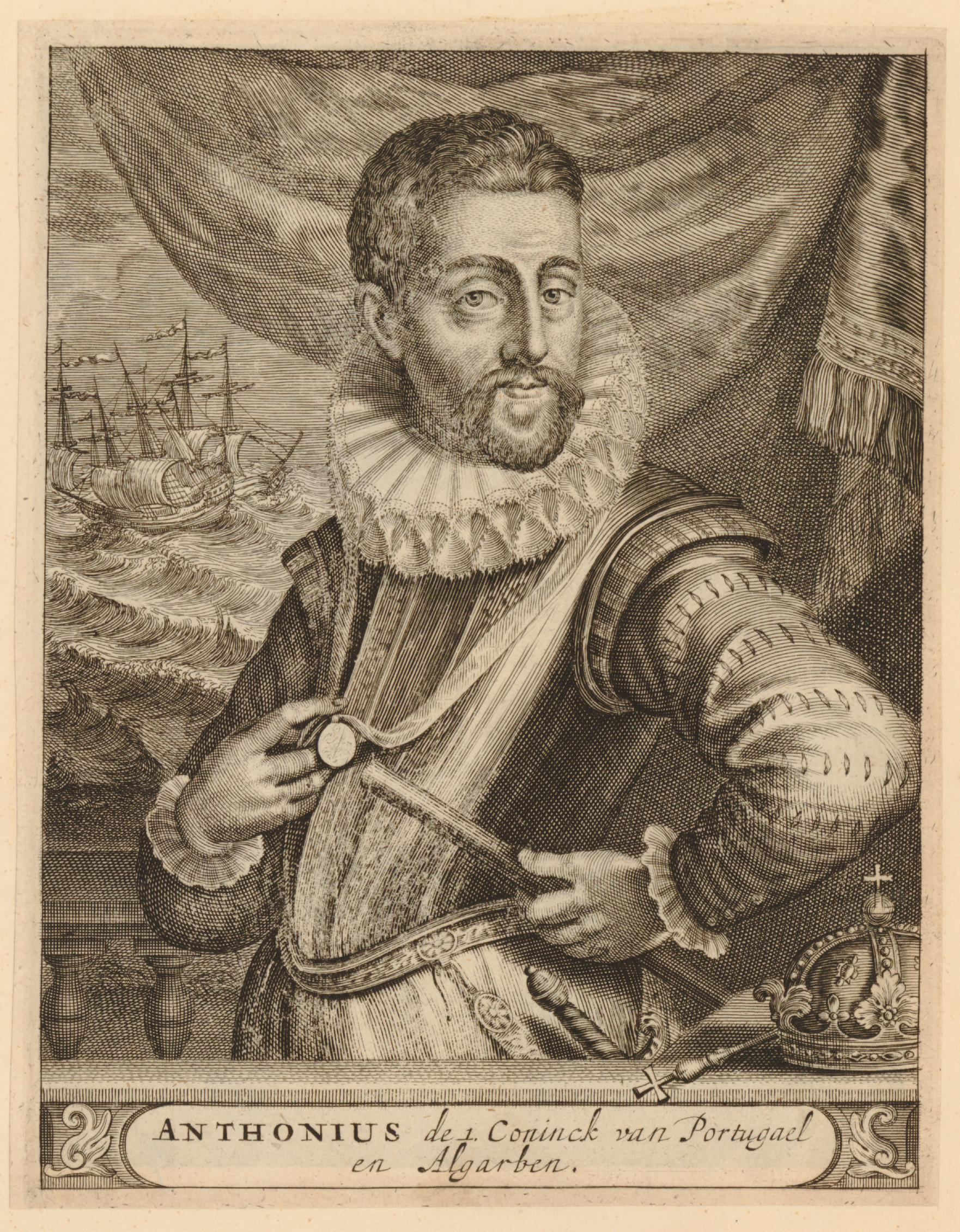
António, Prior of Crato

The Capture of Porto took place in October 1580 by the Spanish forces commanded by Don Sancho d'Avila during the War of the Portuguese Succession. The city was captured easily by the Spanish troops, thereby finishing off the Prior of Crato's army and its final defeat in Mainland Portugal, thus assuring the personal union of Portugal and Spain for 60 years under the Iberian Union.

== Background ==
Following the victory accomplished by the Spanish troops led by Don Fernando Álvarez de Toledo, Duke of Alba at the Battle of Alcântara on 25 August 1580, near Lisbon, the decimated Portuguese army under the command of Dom António, Prior of Crato, fled towards Coimbra and Porto with the intention of reassembling his troops.

The Duke of Alba, noticing the remote but possible threat, ordered his General Don Sancho d'Avila to pursue across the sea and completely destroy them in order to wrap up any opposition to Philip II of Portugal.

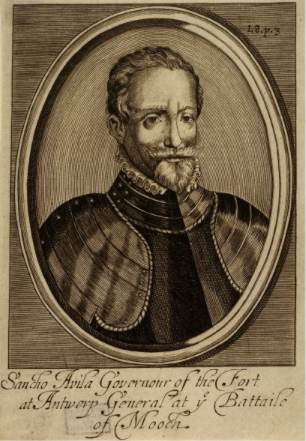
Sancho d'Avila

== Porto ==
The Spanish troops commanded by Don Sancho d'Avila, transported by sea, arrived and disembarked in Porto on 24 October 1580. The city was captured easily by the Spanish army, thereby finishing off Portuguese army and the invasion of their neighbouring country. Don Sancho d'Avila obtained a victory, it would be his last great military accomplishment.

After the end of the war, the Spanish General returned to Lisbon. In Lisbon he received a wound from a horse which he did not attend to properly and as a consequence he died in May 1583.

== Aftermath ==
With the Spanish capture of Porto, the Kingdom of Portugal was controlled by the Spanish armies. Only the Azores Islands escaped from Spanish control. In early 1581, Dom António fled to France carrying with him the Portuguese Crown Jewels, including many valuable diamonds. He was well received by the Queen of France, Catherine of Medici, who had a claim of her own to the Crown of Portugal. By promising to cede the Portuguese colony of Brazil to her and the sale of some Portuguese jewels, Dom António secured support to form a fleet manned by the French and Portuguese led by him and Filippo di Piero Strozzi, a Florentine exile in the service of France, and also supported by the English fleet.
