= Francisco de Portugal, 3rd Count of Vimioso =

Francisco de Portugal, also known as Francis II of Portugal, 3rd Count of Vimioso (c. 1550 – 1582), was the eldest son and heir of the 2nd Count of Vimioso, Afonso de Portugal (Alphonse of Portugal).

He was one of the few high-ranking Portuguese nobles to support the claims of António, Prior of Crato, during the War of the Portuguese Succession (1580–1583).

== Early life ==
As his first official position, he was appointed special ambassador to Madrid (1574) in order to negotiate the marriage of King Sebastian of Portugal to Princess Maximiliana of Bavaria (daughter of Duke Albert V of Bavaria), but the mission failed.

Later, in 1578, along with his father, he participated in the royal crusade to Morocco, and he fell prisoner to Ahmad al-Mansur's armies during the Battle of Ksar El Kebir. He managed to pay his ransom and even helped others to pay theirs. He returned to Europe through San Lucar, in southern Spain, where he was received with all honours by the Duke of Medina Sidonia, Alonso de Guzman. As he testified of the King's death during the battle, there and for the first time he supported Dom António, Prior of Crato as the natural heir of the Portuguese throne, refuting the Spanish Duke's position for Philip II of Spain's claims.

== Fight for freedom ==
After King Henry's death (31 January 1580), Francis of Portugal was one of the few members of the upper aristocracy to support actively Dom António as King of Portugal. He was appointed by the new King as his Constable, and they participated together in the Battle of Alcântara (1580), defending Lisbon from the Spanish armies, led by the Duke of Alba.

With Philip's victory, both King Anthony I and the Count of Vimioso fled to exile, first in France and later in England.

In 1582 he sailed, in the fleet led by the Italian adventurer Filippo Strozzi, to the Azores, the sole Portuguese territory that still recognised Anthony I as King of Portugal. He died on 29 July 1582, just after the naval Battle of Vila Franca off São Miguel Island.

Dom Francisco de Portugal was never married and had no issue. He was succeeded in his house by his younger brother, Louis of Portugal, 4th Count of Vimioso.

Portuguese nobility
| Preceded by Afonso de Portugal, 2nd Count | Count of Vimioso; 1579–1582 | Succeeded by Luís de Portugal, 4th Count |

== Bibliography ==
- "Nobreza de Portugal e do Brasil" – Vol. III, Pages 539 and 540. Published by Zairol Lda., Lisbon 1989.
