= Battle of Flushing =

1573 battle

Coordinates: 51°27′N 3°35′E

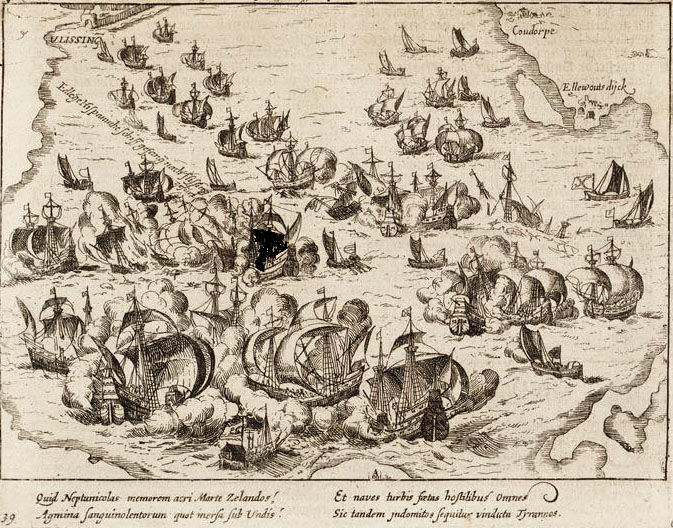
Battle of Flushing

The Battle of Flushing was a naval battle of the Eighty Years' War, fought on April 17, 1573 near the city of Flushing, Netherlands. The Spanish fleet was led by Sancho d'Avila, the Dutch fleet by Lieven Keersmaker.

The Dutch fleet initially left Flushing, but returned when the Spanish fleet was hit by the city's cannons. Five Spanish ships were seized, but the remainder managed to reach the cities of Middelburg and Arnemuiden.
