= Battle of Alcântara (1580) =

Battle for the throne of Portugal

- Part of the War of the Portuguese Succession
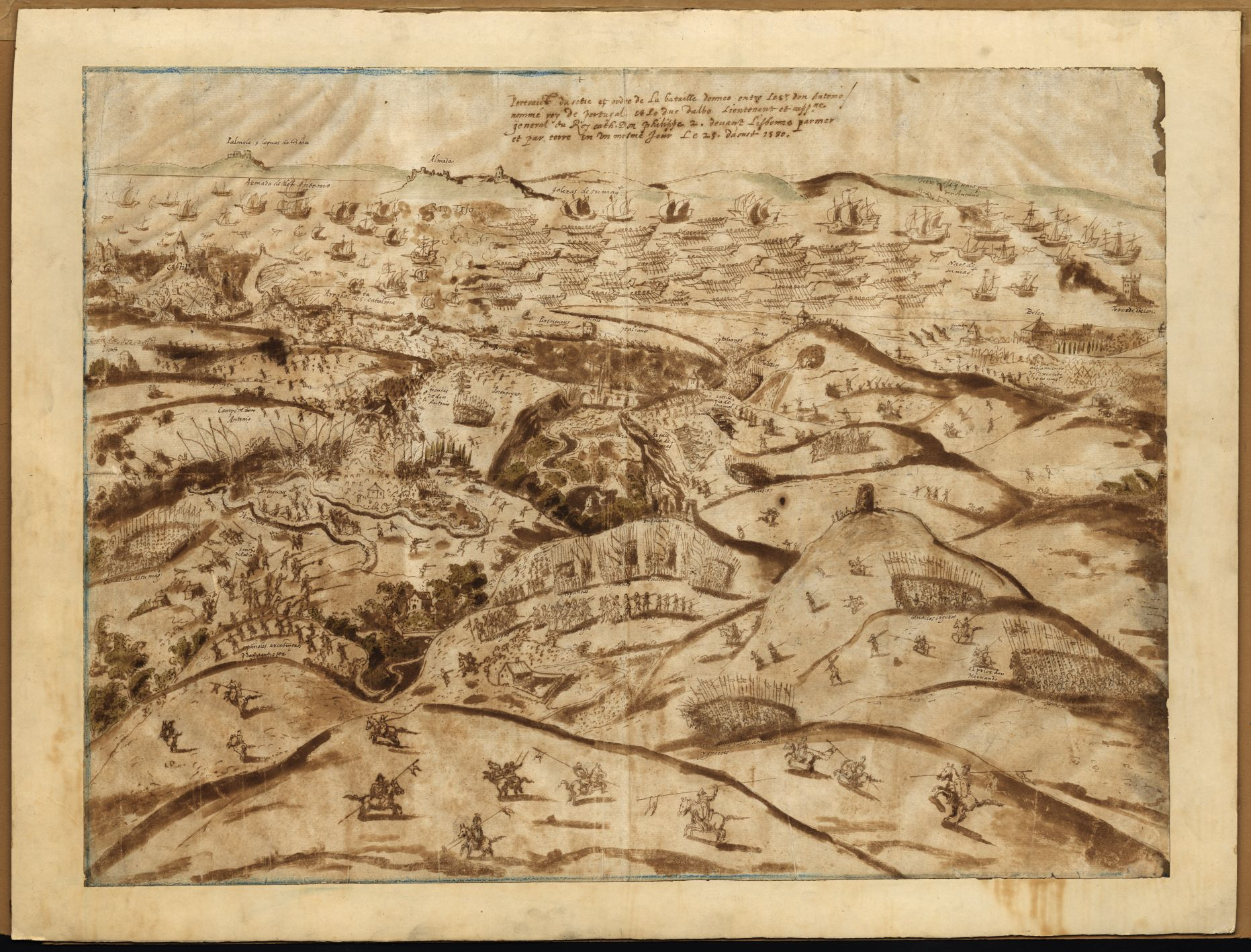
- Engraving of the Battle of Alcântara (1580).
Date	25 August 1580
Location	Alcântara (Lisbon), Portugal
Result	Spanish victory

Belligerents
Spain	Pro-Crato Portugal

Commanders and leaders
(Spain) Duke of Alba (Spain) Sancho d'Avila	(Portugal) Prior of Crato (Portugal) Count of Vimioso

Strength
13,000 infantry 1,800 cavalry 22 guns	8,000 infantry 500 cavalry 30 guns

Casualties and losses
500 dead or wounded	4,000 dead or captured

The Battle of Alcântara took place on 25 August 1580, near the brook of Alcântara, in the vicinity of Lisbon, Portugal, and was a victory of the King of Habsburg Spain Philip II over the other pretender to the Portuguese throne, Dom António, Prior of Crato.

== Background ==
In Portugal, the death of King Sebastian of Portugal in 1578, with only an elderly childless great uncle to succeed him, plunged the country into a succession crisis. King Philip II of Spain was one of seven who laid claim to the Portuguese throne, and in June 1580 a Spanish army of about 40,000 men (of which about half were German or Italian mercenaries) invaded Portugal under the command of Don Fernando Álvarez de Toledo, Duke of Alba.

Two years earlier, the Portuguese army had had a major defeat at the Battle of Ksar El Kebir (1578), causing the death or imprisonment of thousands of Portuguese soldiers along with some nobles. What was left of the Portuguese nobility and high clergy chose to support Philip II rather than Dom António, who was therefore forced to recruit an irregular army composed mainly of local peasants and townspeople as well as 3,000 enslaved African men, who fought for António in exchange for their freedom.

== Battle ==
The Duke of Alba met little resistance and in July 1580 landed his forces at Cascais, west of Lisbon. By mid-August, the Duke was only 10 kilometers from the city. West of the small brook Alcântara, the Spanish encountered a Portuguese force on the eastern side of it, commanded by Dom António (a grandson of King Manuel I of Portugal), who had proclaimed himself King as António I, and his lieutenant Francisco de Portugal, 3rd Count of Vimioso.

The battle ended in a decisive victory for the Spanish army, both on land and sea. Two days later, the Duke of Alba captured Lisbon, and on 25 March 1581, Philip of Spain was crowned King of Portugal as Philip I.

== Aftermath ==
The decimated Antonian army fled towards Porto with the intention of reassembling his troops, but was completely destroyed at Porto by the Spanish forces under the command of Don Sancho d'Avila. At the end of 1580, most of the Portuguese territory was in Spanish hands. Two more battles (1582 and 1583) over the succession were fought in the Azores.

Spain and Portugal would remain united in a personal union of the crowns (remaining formally independent and with autonomous administrations) for the next 60 years, until 1640. This period is called the Iberian Union.

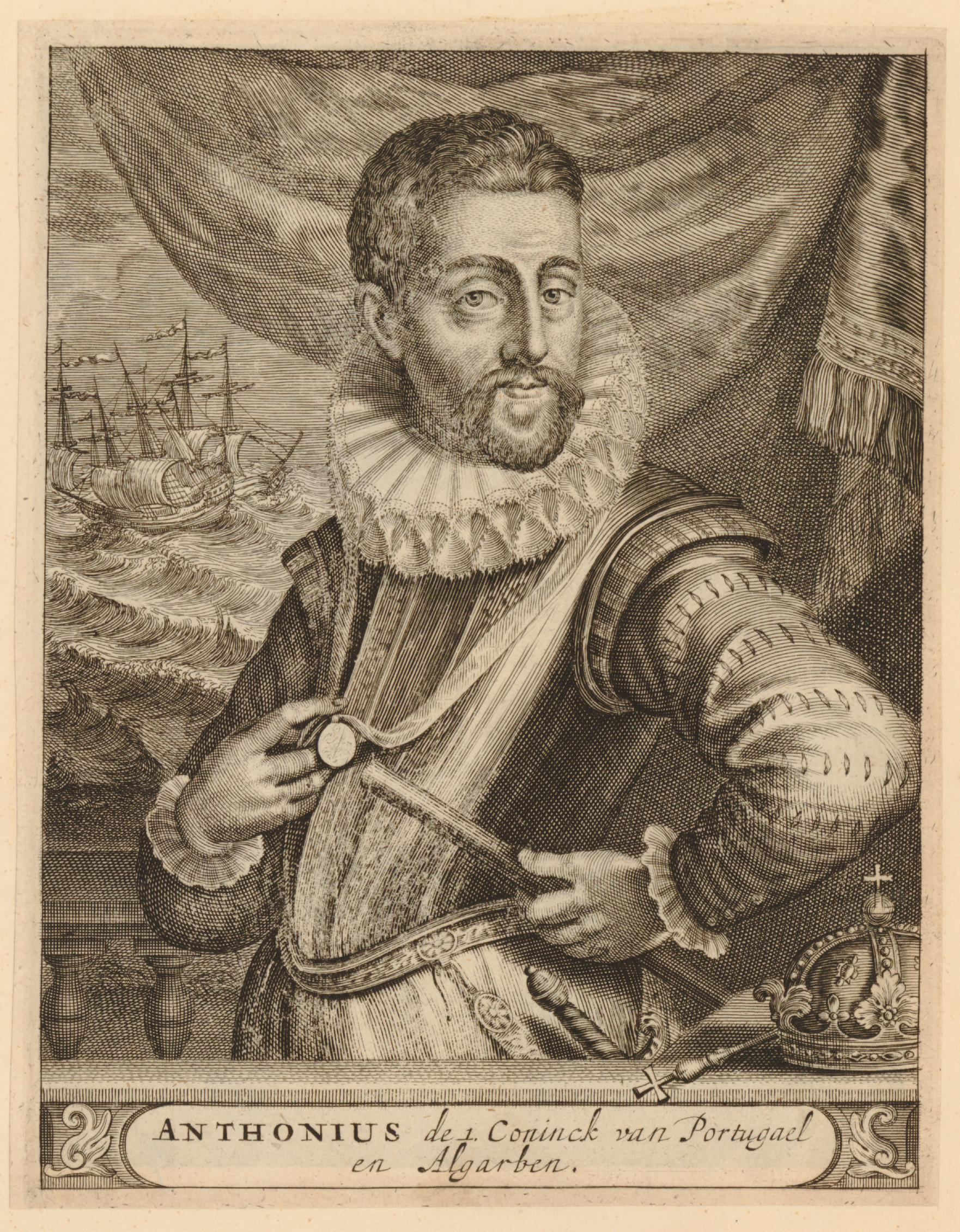
António, Prior of Crato

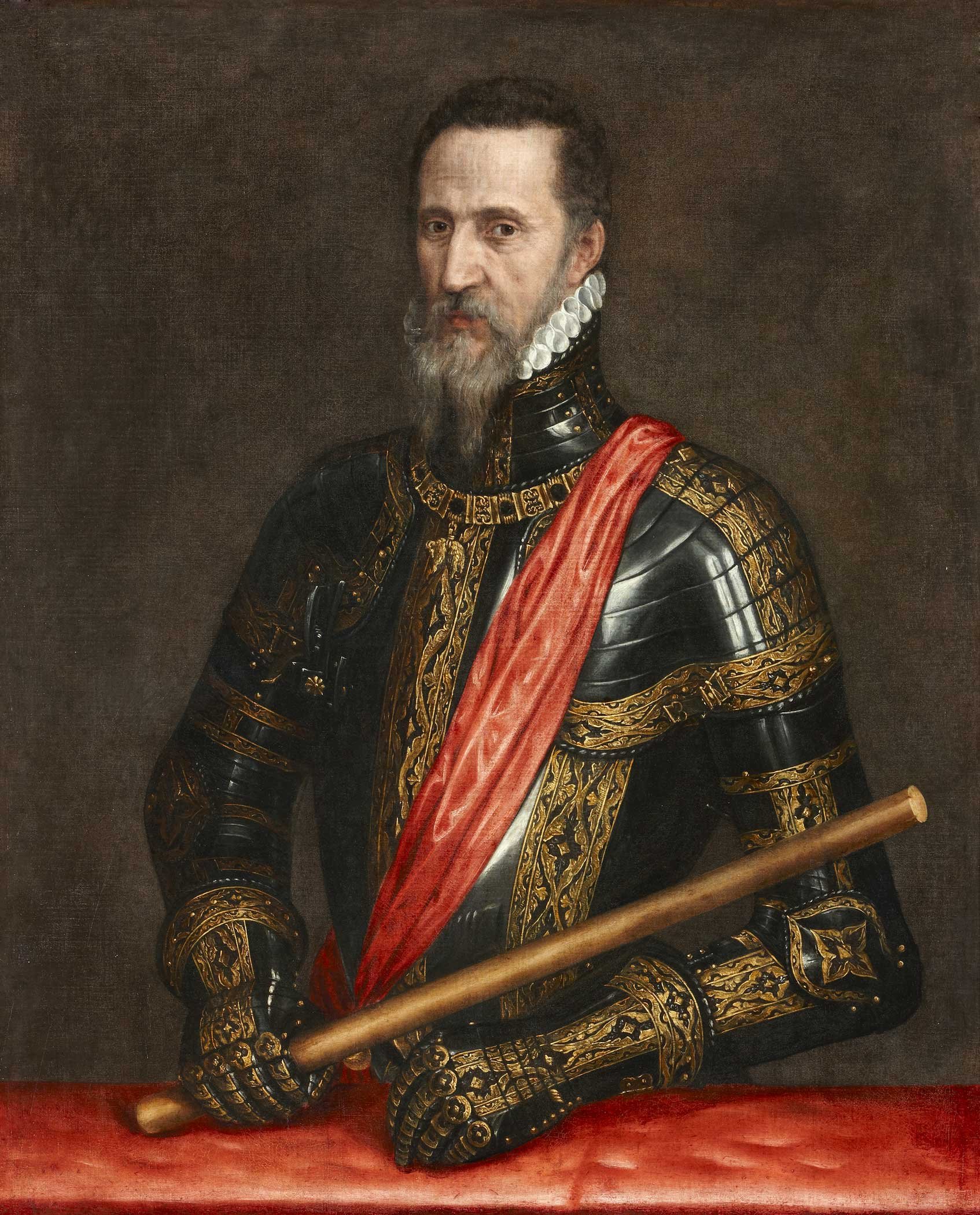
Fernando Álvarez de Toledo, Duke of Alba

== See also ==
- War of the Portuguese Succession
- Capture of Porto
- Battle of Ponta Delgada
- Conquest of the Azores
- Timeline of Portuguese history
