= Sancho d'Avila =

Spanish general (1523–1583)

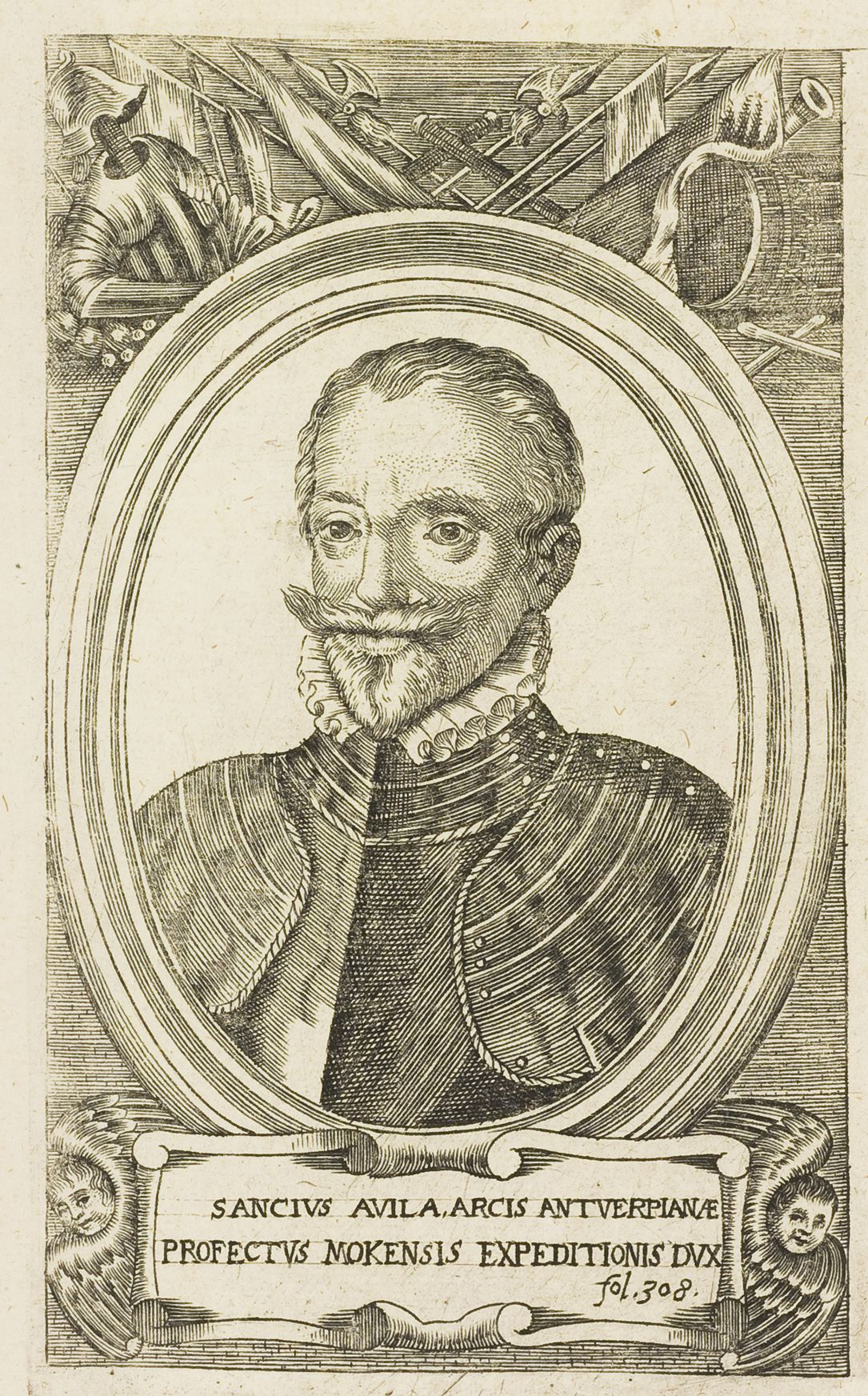
- Born: September 21, 1523; Ávila, Habsburg Spain
- Died: March 1583 (aged 59–60) Lisbon, Kingdom of Portugal
- Allegiance: Spanish Empire
- Branch: Army
- Rank: Captain
- Conflicts: Schmalkaldic War; Battle of Mühlberg; Ottoman–Habsburg wars; Capture of Mahdia (1550); Battle of Djerba; Italian War of 1551–1559; Eighty Years' War; Battle of Dahlen; Battle of Le Quesnoy (1568); Relief of Goes; Battle of Flushing; Battle of Borsele; Battle of Mookerheyde; Sack of Antwerp; War of the Portuguese Succession (DOW); Battle of Alcântara (1580); Capture of Porto

Don Sancho Dávila y Daza (21 September 1523 – 1583) was a Spanish army general.

== Biography ==
Dávila was born on 21 September 1523, in Ávila. He first served as the commander of the Duke of Alba's bodyguard. It was in this function that Dávila arrested the Count of Egmont.

When the Eighty Years' War started, Dávila suffered a defeat in the Battle of Le Quesnoy. He was also involved in the 1572 Siege of Middelburg and the Battle of Flushing a year later. In 1574, Dávila defeated Louis and Henry, brothers of William the Silent, in the Battle of Mookerheyde.

In 1576, as commander of the Spanish troops in the Citadel of Antwerp, Dávila was the main instigator of the Sack of Antwerp in which between 7,000 and 18,000 lives and a great deal of property were lost. Four years later, he participated with the Duke of Alba at the Battle of Alcântara.

In 1580, Dávila captured the key Portuguese city of Porto which secured Spain's personal union with Portugal for more than 60 years and finished off António, Prior of Crato's army in the War of the Portuguese Succession.

Dávila died during the Portuguese campaign in May 1583, aged 59 or 60, due to injuries caused by a horse's kick. At first, the injury did not appear serious and the wound healed cleanly, but nine days later the area became infected with a fatal outcome. His remains, originally laid to rest in the Convent of San Francisco in Lisbon, were later transferred to the main chapel of the Church of San Juan Bautista in the city of Ávila.
