= Battle of Le Quesnoy (1568) =

1568 battle of the Eighty Years' War

Coordinates: 50°15′N 3°30′E

Battle of le Quesnoy (1568)
- Part of the Eighty Years' War
Date	12 November 1568
Location	Le Quesnoy, Nord-Pas-de-Calais, France
Result	Dutch rebel victory

Belligerents
Dutch rebels	(Spanish Empire) Habsburg Netherlands

Commanders and leaders
William of Orange	(Spanish Empire) Sancho d'Avila

The Battle of Le Quesnoy (Le Quesnoy, Hainault, 12 November 1568) was fought between a mostly German army supporting the Dutch rebels and the Spanish Habsburg army.

== Background ==
In October 1568, William of Orange had invaded the Spanish Netherlands with a considerable army. Despite capturing some fortified towns, he did not manage to face the Spanish Army under the Duke of Alva in a decisive battle. Manoeuvering to meet up with a French Huguenot army, Orange lost his rear-guard at the Battle of Jodoigne.

On 23 or 24 October, near Wavre, Orange's army met the Protestant Huguenot force from France led by Francois de Hangest Sieur de Genlis & d'Abbecourt. It was small, about 2,000 infantry and 500 cavalry (estimates of the total vary between 2,000 and a probably exaggerated 5,800). The French were commanded by Francois de Hagest, Genlis himself, and Sieur de Morvilliers, assisted by the Barons of Ranty, Mouy, Autricourt, Desternay, Requires, and la Personne. The commander of the French infantry was Capitain Poyet.

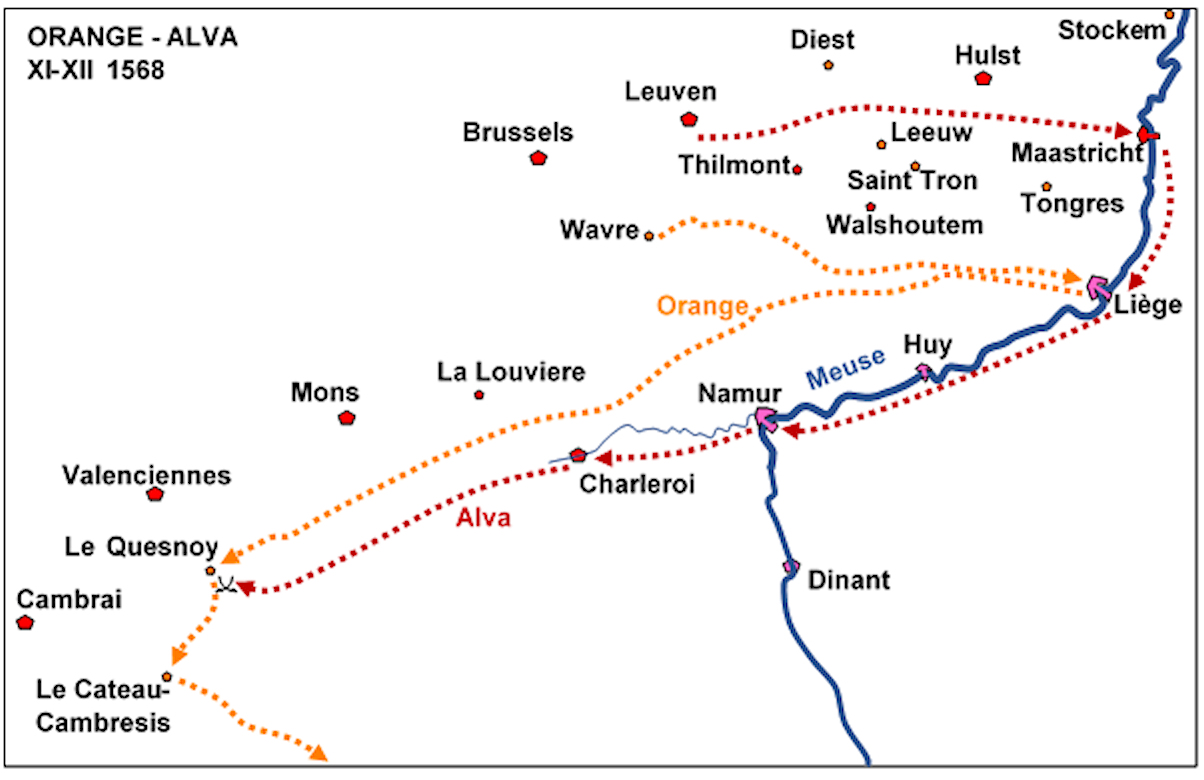
Campaign Map of Prince of Orange vs Duke of Alva November and December 1568

Orange's army was mostly from Germany, and with winter developing, they needed to get home. The river Meuse had swollen to winter proportions, so it could only be crossed at a bridge, and all the bridges were in cities controlled either by Alva or by the Prince-Bishop of Liège, Gerard van Groesbeeck.

On 3 November 1568, Orange set up camp outside Liège. The Prince-Bishop of Liège, Gerard van Groesbeeck, neither yielded to demands nor would he permit passage through his state. Orange's army ransacked some monasteries. The Prince Bishop of Liege, Groesbeck, appealed to Alva for help and initially Alva reinforced Liège and Huy (Dutch: Hoei; Walloon: Hu) with companies of Walloons. Orange, hoping to gain submission of the city and passage for his troops, demonstrated an assault on Liège during the night of 4–5 December, but hearing that Alva’s main army was approaching he abandoned the siege on the morning of 5 December.

The only option for Orange was to march south-west into Hainault (or Dutch: Henegouwen; German: Hennegau). Alva, with his army, of course followed.

== Battle ==
Outside Le Quesnoy (or between le Quesnoy and Cambrai) on 12 November 1568, Orange 's army finally had a good opportunity to fight some of the Spanish army, including 10 German companies of infantry, 8 Spanish companies of infantry, and 3 cornets of cavalry.

The Spanish were defeated. The Spanish commander Sancho d'Avila, along with his officers Francois de Tolede and Ruy de Lopez were wounded and the son of the Duke of Alva, Don Rufille Henriques, died in the action. The fortified town of Le Quesnoy yielded to Orange, to be relieved a few days later by the Spanish. Nearby the fortified town of Le Cateau-Cambrésis put up a fight killing some of Orange 's troops but was also defeated.

== Aftermath ==
Genlis and other French officers proposed that Orange should change focus to support the French Protestants or Huguenots. However, most of Orange's army, who had signed on to fight the more lucrative Spanish enemy, would not do that.

On 17 November, Alva's army entered Le Cateau-Cambrésis and Orange's army moved away into France, marched through Picardy, Champagne, and Lorraine, to Strasbourg.

In that city, Orange disbanded most of his army, yet retained his reputation, by paying the troops, even at the cost of selling the army cannons, his own silverware, and mortgaging rights to his lands. With that reputation, Orange would return to the Netherlands in later years to continue the Dutch Revolt.

The next step for Orange was to take the rump of his army, some 1,200 cavalry, to join Count Palatine Wolfgang of Zweibrücken who was heading to support the Huguenots in the Third French War of Religion.
