= Battle of Mookerheyde =

1574 battle

- Part of the Eighty Years' War
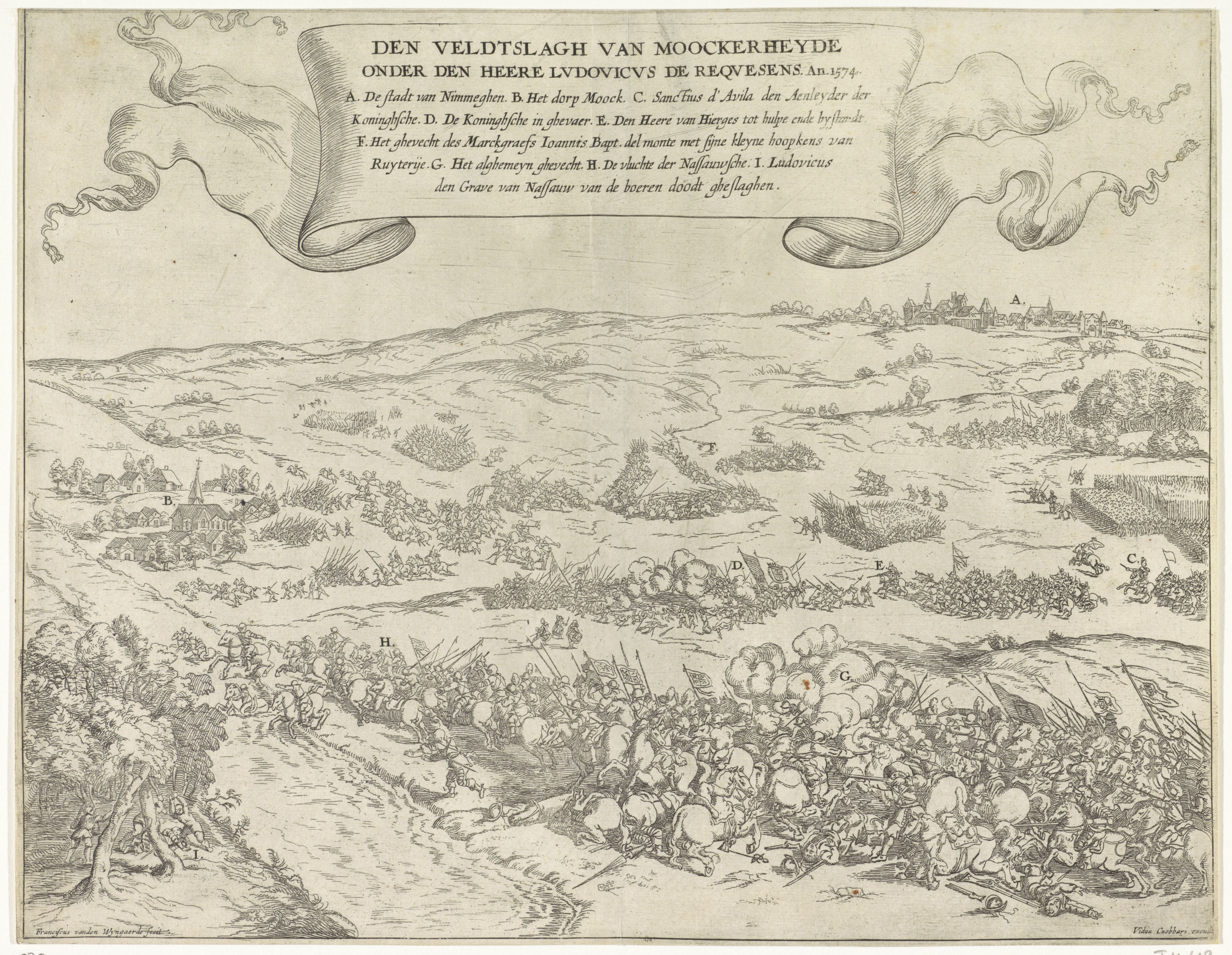
Date	14 April 1574
Location	Mook en Middelaar, Limburg (present-day the Netherlands)
Result	Spanish victory

Belligerents
Dutch rebels	Spain

Commanders and leaders
Louis of Nassau †; Henry of Nassau †	(Spain) Sancho d'Avila (Spain) Bernardino de Mendoza

Strength
5,500 infantry 2,600 cavalry	5,000 infantry 800 cavalry

Casualties and losses
3,000 dead or wounded	150 dead or wounded

In the Battle of Mookerheyde, Spanish Tercios defeated Dutch forces composed of German mercenaries, on 14 April 1574, during the Eighty Years' War on the heath (heide in modern Dutch) near the village Mook and the river Meuse, not far from Nijmegen in Gelderland. Two leaders of the Dutch forces, brothers of William the Silent, were killed: Louis of Nassau (born 1538) and Henry of Nassau-Dillenburg (born 1550).

During the winter of 1573/74, Louis and Henry of Nassau raised a mercenary army in Germany of 6500 infantry and 3000 cavalry. They proceeded towards Maastricht to rendezvous with their elder brother William the Silent, Prince of Orange, who led 6000 Dutchmen. They planned to march their combined forces toward Leiden, which had been under siege by a large Spanish force since October 1573.

The strength of Count Louis' forces diminished en route. More than a thousand men deserted and seven hundred were killed by the Spanish in a night attack. The remaining troops were mutinous because the Dutch had been unable to pay them. Louis crossed the Meuse with only 5,500 infantry and 2,600 cavalry. Before Louis could join forces with William, Luis de Requesens temporarily lifted the siege of Leiden so that his 5,000 infantry and 800 cavalry could counter Louis' advance. The Spanish army was led by Sancho d'Avila and Bernardino de Mendoza. The armies met near the village of Mook. Well timed attacks by the Spanish lancers destroyed the Dutch cavalry and the Spanish proved victorious.

The Dutch suffered a disastrous defeat, losing at least 3,000 men. The Dutch army of mercenaries, still not paid, soon dispersed. William long hoped that his brothers had been captured, but Louis and Henry were apparently killed and their bodies were never recovered.

The Spanish then resumed the siege of Leiden, which failed when Dutch forces relieved the city in October, with the use of a rebel fleet and much assistance from the incoming sea as dykes were breached to flood the low-lying land.

During the battle, Spanish forces seized the command baton that William the Silent had given his brother Louis. The baton, long forgotten, was discovered at the Jesuit residence in San Cugat in Barcelona (Spain). In 2017, the General Superior of the Jesuits, Arturo Sosa SJ, returned the baton to King Willem-Alexander of the Netherlands in a ceremony at the Vatican. The transfer was symbolic, in that ownership of the baton is retained by Catalonia (Spain) as part of its cultural and historic patrimony. The baton had passed to the Jesuits as part of the estate of Luis de Requesens, Governor General of the Spanish Netherlands in 1574. The Dutch plan to display it at the National Military Museum.
