= Christopher Watson (translator) =

English historian and translator (died 1581)

Christopher Watson (died 1581) was an English historian and translator.

== Life ==
A native of Durham, Watson was educated at St John's College, Cambridge, where he proceeded B.A. in 1566. For some time he resided with Thomas Gawdy, then recorder of Norwich, at his residence Gawdy Hall in Harleston, Norfolk. He commenced M.A. in 1569, and his name occurs in the list of the opponents of the new statutes of the university in 1572.

Watson was ordained deacon at Norwich in 1574. It is supposed that he died before 12 June 1581, when the Stationers' Company licensed to Henry Carre "a lamentation for the death of Mr. Christofer Watson, mynister". He has been tentatively identified with the Christopher Watson who was appointed rector of Bircham Newton, Norfolk, in 1573, and also resigned the rectory of Beechamwell in the same county before 1583.

== Works ==
Watson published:

- The Hystories of the most famous and worthy Cronographer Polybius: Discoursing of the warres betwixt the Romanes and Carthaginienses, a riche and goodly Worke, conteining holsome counsels and wonderfull devises against the incombrances of fickle Fortune. Englished by C. W. Whereunto is annexed an Abstracte, compendiously coarcted out of the life and worthy acts perpetrate by our puissant Prince King Henry the fift, London, 1568, dedicated to Thomas Gawdy (who may be Thomas Gawdy of Weybread, not the recorder). Watson worked from the Latin version of Polybius by Niccolò Perotti. The section on Henry V followed Edward Hall. It was during his Harleston period that Watson appears to have composed this translation. A licence was granted by the Stationers' Company to Thomas Hackett in 1565; but no copy of an impression bearing that date is known to exist.
- Catechisme, London, 1579.

A tract Briefe Principles of Religion for the Exercise of Youth: done by C. W. (London, 1581), has been assigned to Watson (in the British Museum Catalogue). He also made collections on the history of Durham, which are in the Cottonian manuscripts.

== Notes ==
Attribution

This article incorporates text from a publication now in the public domain: Lee, Sidney, ed. (1899). "Watson, Christopher". Dictionary of National Biography. Vol. 60. London: Smith, Elder & Co.
