= Henry of Nassau-Dillenburg =

Nobleman of the House of Nassau (1550–1574)

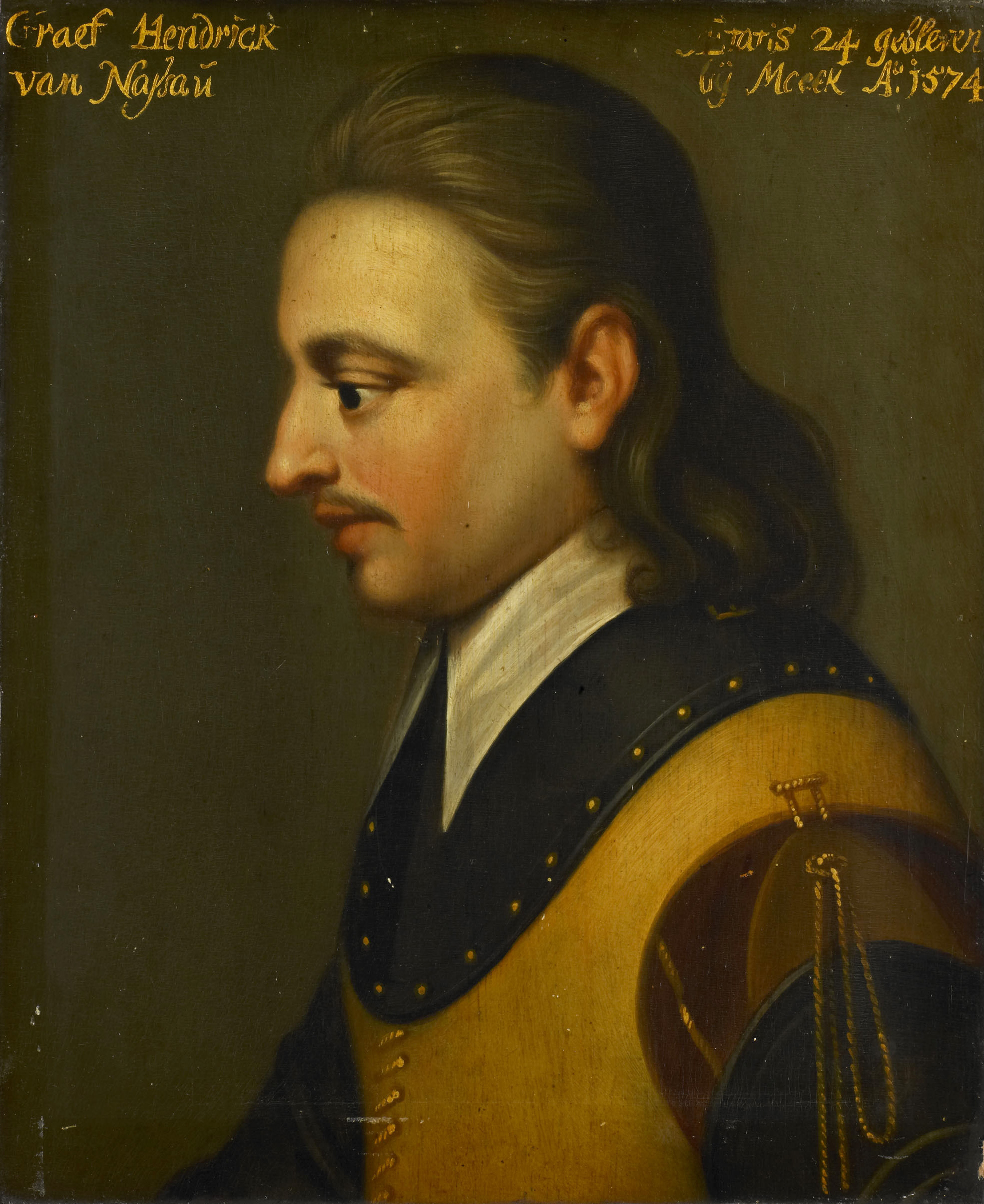
Portrait from the workshop of Wybrand de Geest, c. 1633–1635

Henry of Nassau, Count of Nassau-Dillenburg (Dillenburg, 15 October 1550 – Mook, 14 April 1574), was the youngest brother of William I of Orange-Nassau.

He was the twelfth and last child of William the Rich and Juliana of Stolberg-Werningerode, and was raised a Lutheran. He studied in Leuven and Strasbourg. He and his brothers William and Louis joined the Huguenot army of Louis I de Bourbon, prince de Condé and took part in the Battle of Moncontour (30 October 1569). Henry fell in the Battle of Mookerheyde at the age of 23. His elder brother Louis was also killed in this battle. Their bodies have never been recovered.
