= Adolf of Nassau (1540–1568) =

Count of Nassau

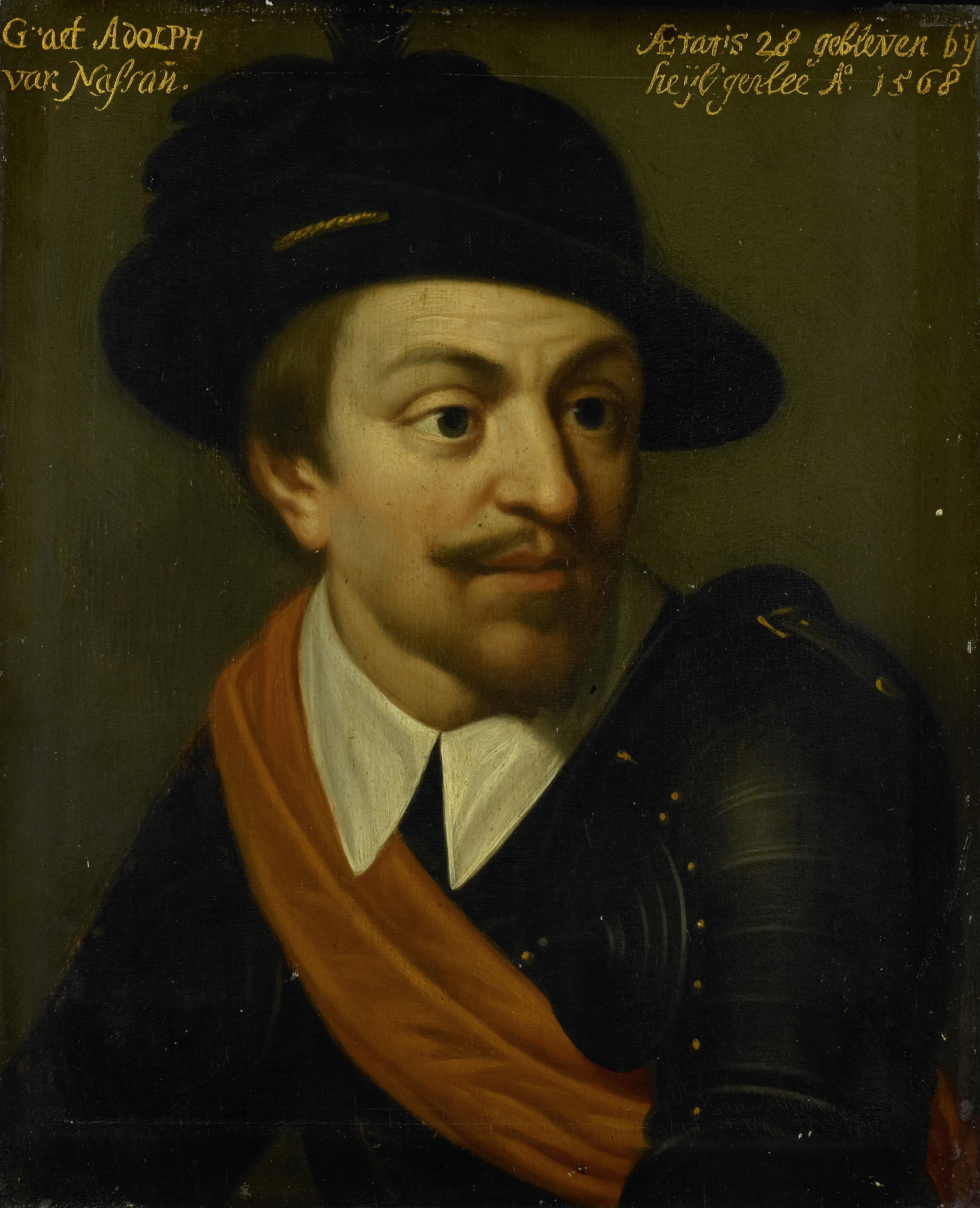
Portrait from the workshop of Wybrand de Geest, c. 1633–1635

Adolf of Nassau (Dillenburg, 11 July 1540 – Heiligerlee, 23 May 1568) was a count of Nassau, also known as Adolphus of Nassau. He was the fourth son and sixth child of William I, Count of Nassau-Siegen and Juliana of Stolberg. He was the second youngest brother of William the Silent.

== Life and death ==
He studied at Wittenberg and in 1566 fought against the Turks, then pushing into Europe. In 1568 his brother William the Silent took up arms against Philip II of Spain and Adolf fought beside him in Brabant. Adolf then joined the force under his brother Louis of Nassau in the north, where he died at the Battle of Heiligerlee after his horse bolted and crossed Spanish lines. The Spanish troops at Heiligerlee were commanded by Jan van Ligne, duke of Arenberg (or Aremberg), who also died in the battle.

The death of Adolf of Nassau is mentioned in the Dutch national anthem (4th verse):

Graef Adolff is ghebleven, In Vriesland in den slaech,
"Count Adolf has died, in Friesland, in this battle"

== Burial ==
There are several accounts about his burial:

- Count Adolf of Nassau and Jean de Ligne, Count of Arenberg, are said to have laid in state together in the monastic church of Mons Sinai. Later, Adolf would have been transferred to Midwolda and then to the Grote Kerk of Emden.
- Adolf of Nassau is said to have been laid in state in the monastery church and buried with military honours in the castle in Wedde. From there he is said to have been transferred to a family castle in East Frisia.
- It is said that Adolf was buried and then exhumed to prevent the Spaniards from dishonouring his grave. He was then reburied in a secret location.
- He may have been buried in the Grote Kerk in Emden, as the castle at Wedde, the Wedderborg, remained a crucial battle field in the Eighty Years' War and the Grote Kerk had become a refuge for the Dutch Protestants. However, there is nothing in the city archives about a possible burial of the count and the church was heavily damaged in the Second World War.
- In January 2016, historian Lammert Doedens put forward the theory that Count Adolf is buried in the Sint-Lambertus church in Oldenburg. He had received a grant to investigate a family grave and came across a coffin containing the remains of thirty people. The remains of two people were determined to be non-relatives. Doedens believes that one of the two may be Adolf.

== The Graaf Adolfmonument ==
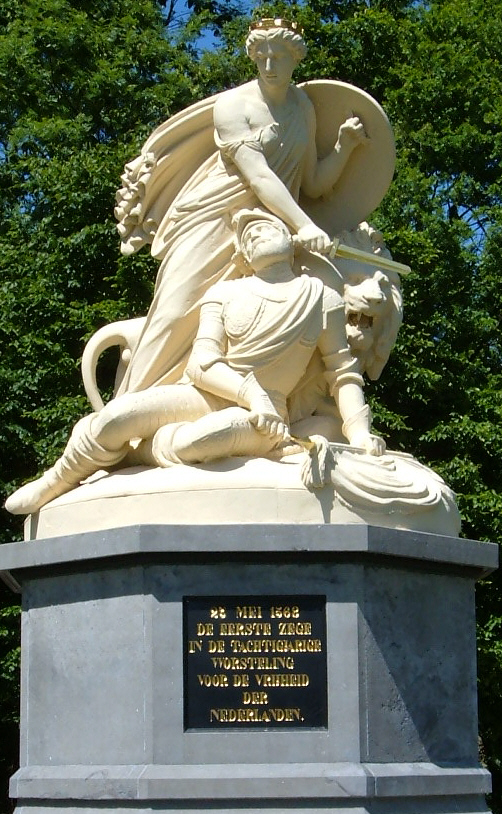
Monument to the battle of Heiligerlee by Joseph Geefs, from a design by J.H. Egenberger. Its plaque reads: '15 May 1568, the first victory in the eighty-years struggle for the freedom of the Netherlands'

The first monument to Adolf was a simple, truncated obelisk with an urn, created in 1826. It was poorly maintained and, by 1868, was badly deteriorated. That year, it was torn down, and a contest was organized to design a replacement for Adolf's three-hundredth anniversary. The winning design was by the painter J.H. Egenberger, in conjunction with Pieter Schenkenberg van Mierop (1837-1904), an architect who later immigrated to the United States. The design features a dying Adolf, protected by the Dutch Maiden.

The contract for executing the statue was given to the Belgian sculptor, Joseph Geefs. Originally, Van Mierop wanted the monument to be placed on a stone hill but, after some disagreement, Geefs designed an octagonal pedestal. The first foundation stone was laid on 23 May 1868, by William, Prince of Orange and Prince Henry. On the same day, five years later, the monument was unveiled by King William III.
