= Battle of Heiligerlee (1568) =

Part of the Eighty Years' War

- Part of the Eighty Years' War
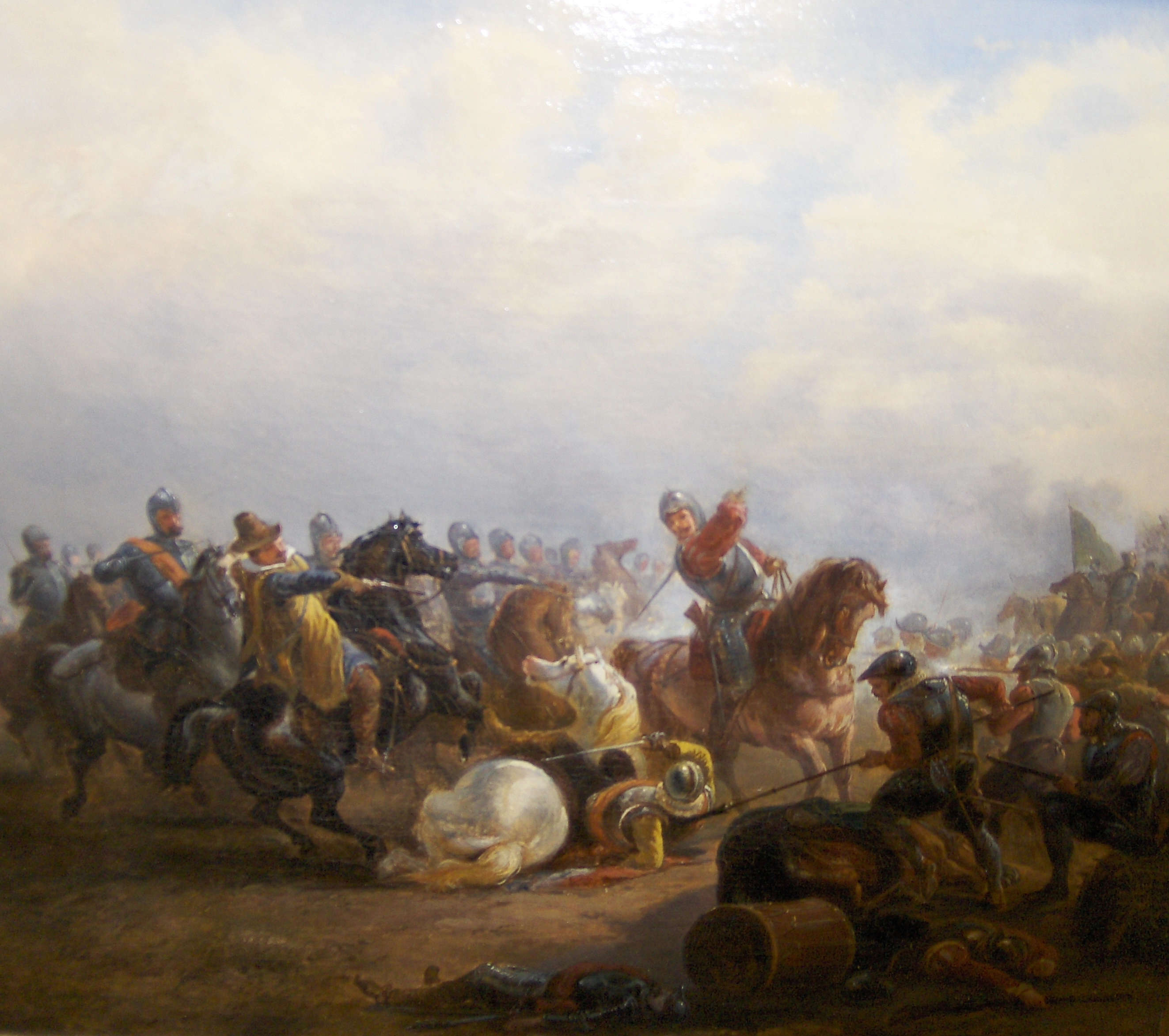
- Battle of Heiligerlee, 1568
Date	23 May 1568
Location	Heiligerlee, Lordship of Groningen, Spanish Netherlands (present-day Netherlands) 53°9′25″N 7°0′10″E
Result	Dutch rebel victory

Belligerents
Dutch rebels	(Spain) Spanish Empire

Commanders and leaders
Louis of Nassau; Adolf of Nassau †	(Spain) Johan de Ligne †

Strength
3,900 infantry 200 cavalry	3,200 infantry 20 cavalry

Casualties and losses
50 dead or wounded	460 Spanish dead

The Battle of Heiligerlee (Heiligerlee, Groningen, 23 May 1568) was fought between Dutch rebels and the Spanish army of Friesland. It was the first Dutch victory during the Eighty Years' War.

The Groningen province of the Spanish Netherlands was invaded by an army consisting of 3,900 infantry, led by Louis of Nassau, and 200 cavalry, led by Adolf of Nassau. Both of them were brothers of William I of Orange. The intention was to begin an armed uprising against the Spanish rulers of the Netherlands.

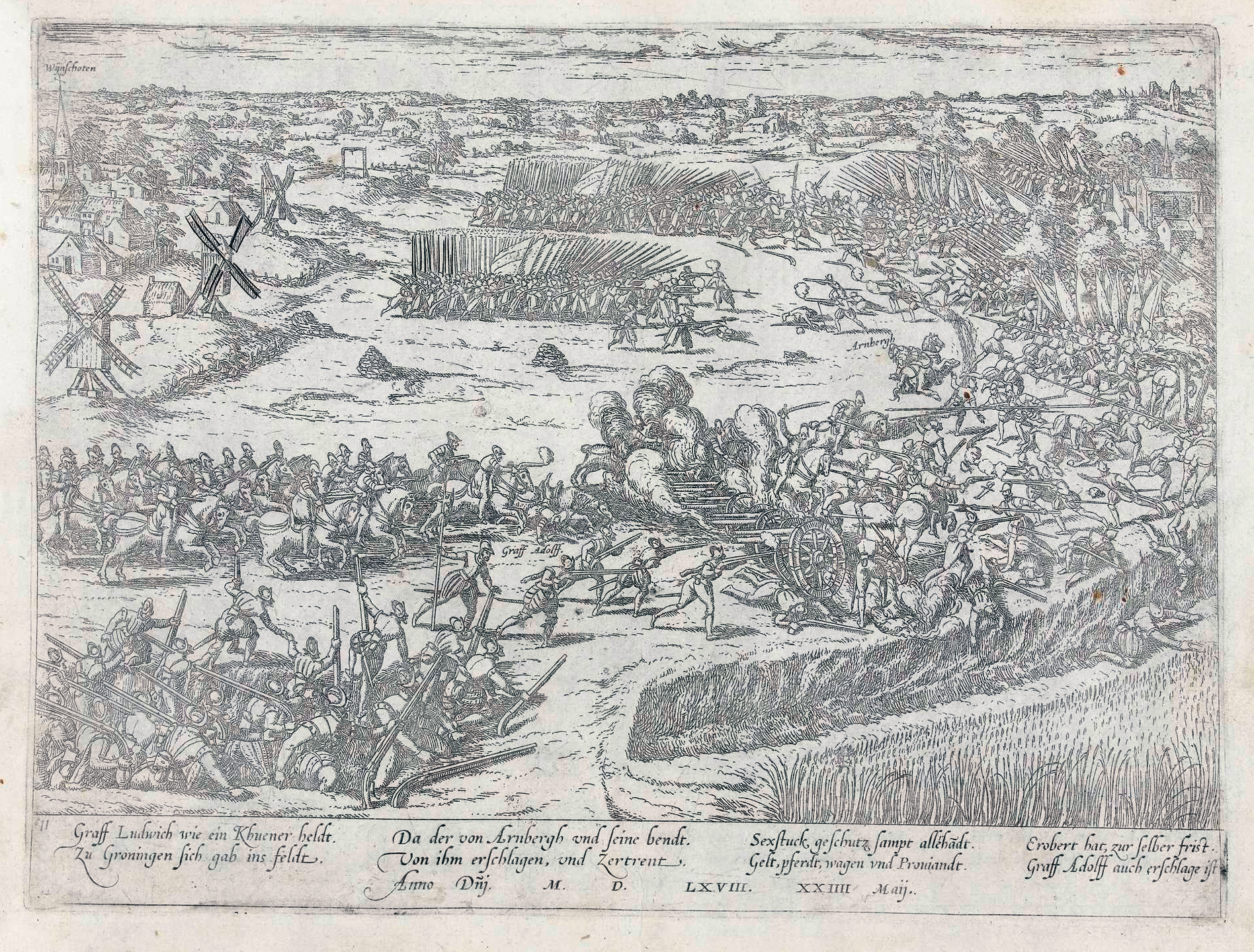
Battle of Heiligerlee 1568

The Stadtholder of Friesland and also Duke of Arenberg, Johan de Ligne, had an army of 3,200 infantry and 20 cavalry.

Aremberg initially avoided confrontation and awaited reinforcements from the Count of Meghem. However, on 23 May, Adolf's cavalry lured him to an ambush at the monastery of Heiligerlee. Louis's infantry made up the bulk of the army and defeated the Spanish force which lost 460 men, and the invading force lost 50, including Adolf. The rebels captured seven cannons.

The invading force, however, did not capture any cities and was soon defeated at the Battle of Jemmingen.

The death of Adolf of Nassau is mentioned in the Dutch national anthem (fourth verse):

Graef Adolff is ghebleven, In Vriesland in den slaech,
"Count Adolf has died, in Friesland, in the battle"
