= Battle of Jemmingen =

1568 battle of the Eighty Years' War

- Part of the Eighty Years' War
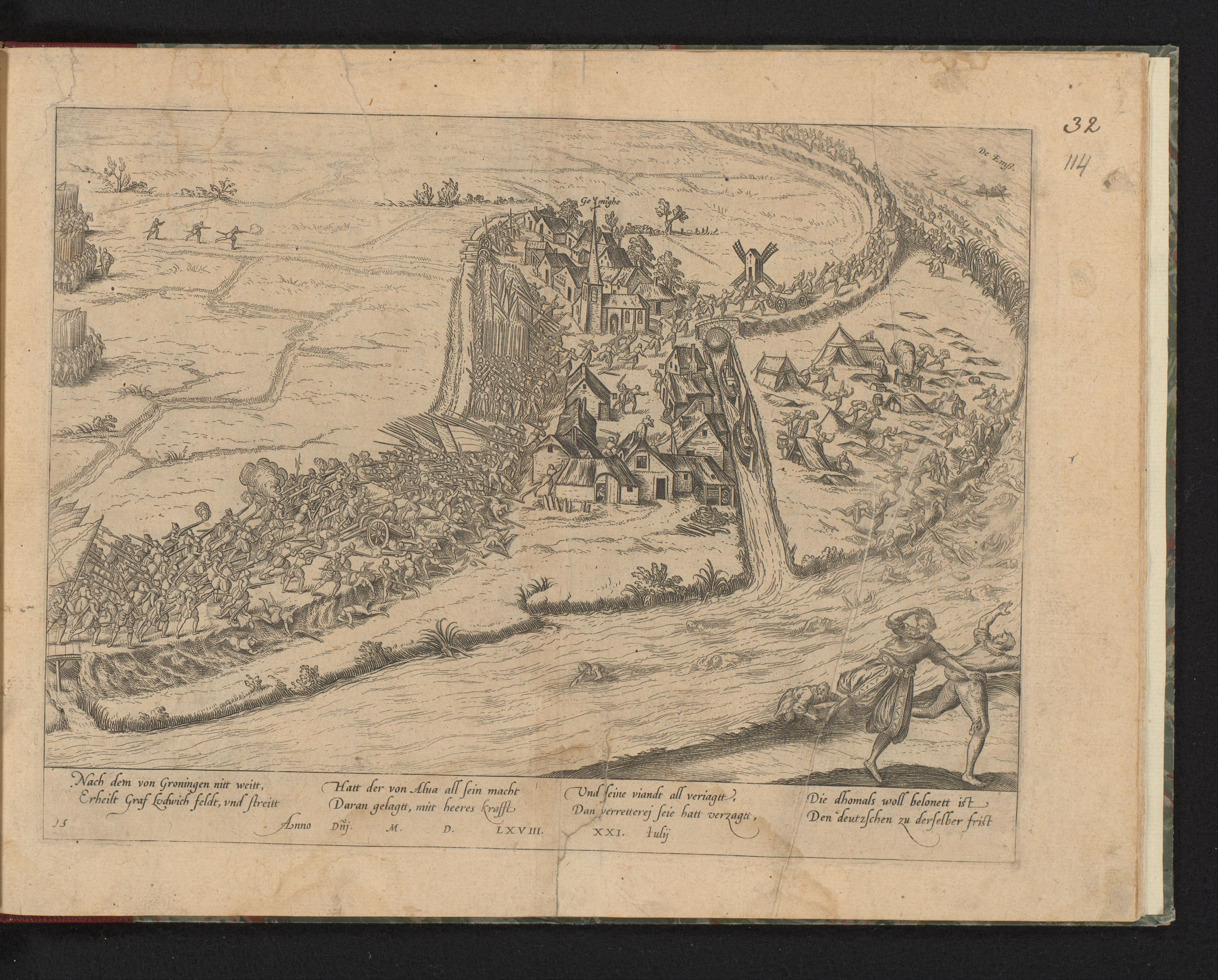
- The Battle of Jemmingen by Frans Hogenberg.
Date	21 July 1568
Location	Jemmingen, County of East Frisia, Holy Roman Empire (present-day Germany) 53°15′N 7°23′E
Result	Flemish-Spanish victory

Belligerents
Dutch rebels	(Spain) Spanish Empire

Commanders and leaders
Louis of Nassau	(Spain) Duke of Alba

Strength
10,000 infantry 2,000 cavalry 16 guns	12,000 infantry 3,000 cavalry

Casualties and losses
7,000 dead or wounded	8 dead 220 wounded

After the Battle of Heiligerlee, the Dutch rebel leader Louis of Nassau (brother of William the Silent) failed to capture the city of Groningen. Louis was driven away by Fernando Álvarez de Toledo, Duke of Alba and defeated at the Battle of Jemmingen (also known as Battle of Jemgum, at Jemgum in East Frisia, now part of Germany) on 21 July 1568.

== Forces ==
The Spanish army consisted of 12,000 infantry (4 tercios), 3,000 cavalry, and some cannons. But only 3,500 Spanish troops gave battle; the rest remained in the rear. Louis of Nassau opposed this 3,500 Spanish with 10,000 infantry (2 groups), some cavalry, and 16 cannons.

== Battle ==
The Spanish army advanced across the flooded field, the water reaching their knees. Their objective was to reach a bridge over one of the locks.

The Duke of Alba ordered the companies of Spanish captains Marcos de Toledo, Diego Enríquez, and Hernando de Añasco to advance and capture it, which they did with an attack by Spanish pikemen and arquebusiers.

When news of the bridge's loss reached him, Louis of Nassau recognized its importance to both sides and sent 4,000 men to retake the position, which was defended by fewer than 50 men. The Spanish detachment withstood repeated attacks from the Dutch until Spanish reinforcements arrived: the Old Tercio of Lombardy, commanded by Juan de Londoño, and the Old Tercio of Sicily, under the command of Field Marshal Julián Romero.

The Dutch mercenaries decided to flee before the reinforcements, and the two veteran tercios gave chase, until they were halted by artillery fire at the Dutch front line. Standing there, the field marshals requested aid and reinforcements from the Duke of Alba, as they found themselves greatly outnumbered. The astute Duke of Alba ignored their pleas and left them alone in that position, intending to use them as bait.

Louis of Nassau, seeing the two veteran tercios waiting expectantly, decided to attack them with his entire army, composed mostly of Germans. Londoño and Romero waited for them to approach and then opened fire. The intense fire from the Spanish arquebusiers stopped the enemy and scattered them. Seeing the Dutch fleeing the battlefield, the arquebusiers pursued them, managing to seize the Dutch artillery and other fortified positions. In this final action, Captain Lope de Figueroa distinguished himself for his bravery.

The army of Louis of Nassau fled in disarray. Imperial troops pursued them for an entire day, turning the battle into a bloodbath: 6,000 Dutch casualties were recorded, many of them drowned in the canals and the Ems River. Louis of Nassau disguised himself and swam to escape.

== Aftermath ==
On 19 May 1571 a statue of the Duke, cast from one of the captured bronze cannons, was placed in Antwerp citadel. After the Sack of Antwerp in 1576, the city joined the Dutch Revolt and in 1577 the statue was destroyed by an angry crowd.
