= List of Crusades =

Crusades include the traditional numbered crusades and other conflicts that prominent historians have identified as crusades. The scope of the term "crusade" first referred to military expeditions undertaken by European Christians in the 11th, 12th, and 13th centuries to the Holy Land. The conflicts to which the term is applied has been extended by decision to include other campaigns initiated, supported and sometimes directed by the Roman Catholic Church against pagans, heretics or for alleged religious ends. According to historian Thomas F. Madden:

Traditionally, authors have defined the scope of the crusades in terms of the expeditions to the Holy Land...In the past few decades, this construction of the crusades has been largely abandoned by scholars. Although traditional histories included events like the Albigensian Crusade or Baltic Crusades, neither of which was bound for the East, they did so only peripherally. Modern scholarship has rehabilitated this periphery. Most historians now accept that crusading took on many different forms; the general passage to the Holy Land was but one of them. Crusades against pagans, heretics, and enemies of the church were just as common by the thirteenth century as wars against the lands of Islam. Much of Europe's crusading energy was also devoted to removing Muslim invaders from Spain.

This list first discusses the traditional numbered crusades, with the various lesser-known crusades interspersed. The later crusades in the Levant through the 16th century are then listed. This is followed by lists of the crusades against the Byzantine empire, crusades that may have been pilgrimages, popular crusades, crusades against heretics and schismatics, political crusades, the Northern Crusades, crusades in the Iberian peninsula, Italian crusades and planned crusades that were never executed. Comprehensive studies of the Crusades in toto include Murray's The Crusades: An Encyclopedia, Stephen Runciman's A History of the Crusades, 3 volumes (1951–1954),, and the Wisconsin Collaborative History of the Crusades, 6 volumes (1969-1989).

== Crusades to the Holy Land (1095–1291) ==
The conflicts that are usually associated with crusades in the Holy Land begin with the Council of Clermont in 1095 and end with the loss of Acre in 1291. These include the numbered Crusades (First through Eighth or Ninth) with numerous smaller crusades intermixed. One of the first to view the Crusades as a movement was English historian Thomas Fuller (1608–1661), whose Historie of the Holy Warre (1639) identified crusades as the Holy War consisting of "Voyages", numbering One through Thirteen, plus a Last Voyage and two additional Holy Wars. These Voyages include the First through Eighth Crusades in current numbering. Shortly thereafter, French Jesuit Louis Maimbourg (1610–1686) published his Histoire des Croisades pour la délivrance de la Terre Sainte (1675), identify the First through Fifth Crusades. In his work The Crusades—An Encyclopedia, historian Alan V. Murray further explains the traditional numbering of crusades:

It was in the eighteenth century that historians evidently first allocated numbers to individual crusades, from the first to the ninth. However, these numbers are neither consistent nor accurate. Of the identity of the First Crusade (1096—1099) there can be no doubt, but there is no consensus about numbering after the Fourth Crusade (1202–1204). The Crusade of Emperor Frederick II (1227–1229) is sometimes regarded as part of the Fifth Crusade (1217–1221) and sometimes as a separate expedition. This means that the term Sixth Crusade may refer either to Frederick II's crusade or to the first crusade of King Louis IX of France, which might also be called the Seventh Crusade. Consequently, each subsequent number after the fifth might refer to either of two different expeditions. The only absolutely clear method of designating individual crusades is by a combination of dates and descriptive terminology relating to participation, goals, or both, and this is the solution that has been adopted [here]. However, the names of the First, Second, Third, Fourth, and Fifth Crusades, which are at least unambiguous (if not accurate), have been retained, as they are now established by long tradition.

The list of the Crusades to the Holy Land from 1095 through 1291 is as follows.

Crusade	Time	Description
First Crusade	1095–1099	The First Crusade encompases the activities from the Council of Clermont of 1095 through the establishment of the Kingdom of Jerusalem and the Battle of Ascalon in 1099. Sometimes segregated into the People's Crusade and the Princes' Crusade. Some accounts also include the Crusade of 1101 here. The original chroniclers of the First Crusade did not, of course, refer to it as such, or even as a crusade (as noted above). In the twelve Latin chronicles, the event is called, for example, the Deeds of the Franks or the Expedition to Jerusalem. Anna Komnene simply notes the arrival of the various armies in Constantinople, and Arabic historian ibn Athir calls it the Coming of the Franks. Thomas Fuller referred to it as Voyage 1 of the Holy Warre. It is unclear as to who first used the term, but it has been credited to Louis Maimbourg in his 1675 Histoire des Croisades. The term was certainly in common use by the 18th century as seen in Voltaire's Histoire des Croisades (1750–1751) and Edward Gibbon's History of the Decline and Fall of the Roman Empire (1776–1789). Thomas Asbridge's The First Crusade: A New History (2004) is among the standard references used today.
People's Crusade	1096	The People's Crusade was a prelude to the First Crusade led by Peter the Hermit, the first of what is known as the Popular Crusades. It is sometimes regarded as an integral part of the First Crusade, with the Princes' Crusade as the second part. A standard reference is Peter der Eremite. Ein kritischer Beitrag zur Geschichte des ersten Kreuzzuges (1879) by pioneering German historian Heinrich Hagenmeyer (1834–1915). Peter and his crusade achieved a popular status in the 19th century through such works as Heroes of the Crusades (1869) by Barbara Hutton. The references shown above for the First Crusade generally cover the People's Crusade as well.
Crusade of 1101	1101–1102	The Crusade of 1101, also called the Crusade of the Faint-Hearted. Campaigns that followed the capture of Jerusalem in 1099 that were generally ignored by 18th and 19th century historians. Thomas Fuller nevertheless referred to it as Voyage 2 of the Holy Warre whereas Jonathan Riley-Smith considered it part of the First Crusade in his The First Crusaders, 1095-1131 (1997).
Norwegian Crusade	1107–1110	The Norwegian Crusade, also known as the Crusade of Sigurd Jorsalfar, king of Norway. More of a pilgrimage than a crusade, it did include the participation in military action, with the king's forces participation in the siege of Sidon. This crusade marks the first time a European king visited the Holy Land. This crusade is described in Heimskringla by Icelandic historian Snorri Sturluson.
Venetian Crusade	1122–1124	The Venetian Crusade, also known as the Crusade of Calixtus II. The Western participants from the Republic of Venice were regarded by Riley-Smith as First Crusaders, and the actions resulted in the capture of Tyre from the Damascene atabeg Toghtekin. This marked a major victor for Baldwin II of Jerusalem prior to his second captivity in 1123.
Crusade of 1129	1129	The Crusade of 1129, also known as the Damascus Crusade, was begun by Baldwin II of Jerusalem after his captivity. The crusade failed in its objective to capture Damascus and is described by Syriac historian Michael the Syrian in his Chronicle (after 1195).
Second Crusade	1147–1150	After the disastrous Siege of Edessa in 1144, the Western powers launched the Second Crusade, which accomplished little. Principal chroniclers of the event were Odo of Deuil, chaplin to Louis VII of France, who wrote his account De profectione Ludovici VII in Orientem and Otto of Freising who wrote Gesta Friderici imperatoris concerning the emperor Frederick Barbarosso. Referred to as the Second Crusade in Maimbourg's Histoire des Croisades..., as well as Georg Müller's De Expedition Cruciatis Vulgo Von Kreutz Fahrten (1709). Thomas Fuller referred to it as Voyage 3 of the Holy Warre. The Wendish Crusade of 1147 (one of the Northern Crusades) is usually associated with the Second Crusade. Crusader Invasions of Egypt (1154–1169): Attacks into Egypt by Amalric I of Jerusalem to take advantage of crises concerning the Fatimids. These activities eventually led to the fall of the Fatimids and the rise of Saladin and the Ayyubid dynasty.
Crusade to the East	1177	The Crusade to the East was a crusade led by Philip I, Count of Flanders that intended to invade Egypt, instead only mounting an unsuccessful siege of Harim.
Third Crusade	1189–1192	The Third Crusade was launched in response to the loss of Jerusalem to Saladin in 1187 and had significant English participation under Richard I of England, as well as by the emperor Frederick Barbarossa and Philip II of France. To the English, it was known as the Itinerarium Regis Ricardi, the Itinerary of king Richard, and to the Germans as the expedition of Frederick, as described in Historia Peregrinorum (History of the Pilgrims). Thomas Andrew Archer's The Crusade of Richard I, 1189–1192 (1889) provides a comprehensive look at the crusade and its sources. Thomas Fuller referred to Frederick's portion as Voyage 4 of the Holy Warre, and Richard's portion as Voyage 5. The numbering of this crusade followed the same history as the first ones, with English histories such as David Hume's The History of England (1754–1761) and Charles Mills' History of the Crusades for the Recovery and Possession of the Holy Land (1820) identifying it as the Third Crusade. The former only considers the follow-on crusades to the extent that England participated.
Crusade of 1197	1197–1198	The Crusade of 1197, also known as the Crusade of Henry VI or the German Crusade. A crusade led by Holy Roman Emperor Henry VI as a follow-up to the Third Crusade. Although Henry died before the crusade began, it was modestly successful with the recapture of Beirut. Thomas Fuller referred to it as Voyage 6 of the Holy Warre.
Fourth Crusade	1202–1204	The Fourth Crusade, also known as the Unholy Crusade. A major component of the crusade was against the Byzantine empire. Thomas Fuller referred to it as Voyage 7 of the Holy Warre. Charles du Cange, wrote the first serious study of the Fourth Crusade in his Histoire de l'empire de Constantinople sous les empereurs françois (1657). Geoffrey of Villehardouin was a knight and historian who wrote his eyewitness account De la Conquête de Constantinople (c. 1215) of the crusade and its aftermath. Voltaire did not call it a crusade in his Histoire des Croisades, instead calling it the Suite de la Prise de Constantinople par les Croisés. Jonathan Philips' The Fourth Crusade and the Sack of Constantinople (2004) is a standard reference today.
Fifth Crusade	1217–1221	The Fifth Crusade was a failed attempt to recapture Jerusalem by first conquering Cairo. Critical original sources include Historia Damiatina by Oliver of Paderborn (died 1227) and Chronica Hungarorum by Joannes de Thurocz, compiled in the collection Gesta Dei per Francos (God's Work through the Franks) (1611) by Jacques Bongars. A standard reference is Reinhold Röhricht's Studien zur Geschichte des fünften Kreuzzuges (1891). Thomas Fuller referred to it as Voyage 8 of the Holy Warre.
Sixth Crusade	1228–1229	The Sixth Crusade was also known as the Crusade of Emperor Frederick II. Sometimes regarded as part of the Fifth Crusade, it was an extension of that activity that involved little fighting. Jerusalem was nevertheless returned to Western hands by negotiation. Original sources include Chronica Majora (1259) by Matthew Paris and Flores Historiarum (1235) by Roger of Wendover, with Arabic sources that include Abu'l-Feda's Tarikh al-Mukhtasar fi Akhbar al-Bashar (1329). Modern histories include Röhricht's Die Kreuzfahrt Kaiser Friedrich des Zweiten (1228–1229) (1872). Referred to it as Voyage 9 of the Holy Warre by Thomas Fuller in his 1639 Historie. See also references under the Crusade against Frederick II (1220–1241) below.
Barons' Crusade	1239–1241	Barons' Crusade, also referred to as the Crusade of 1239, or the Crusade of Theobald I of Navarre and the Crusade of Richard of Cornwall. Called for in 1234 by Gregory IX in his papal bull Rachel suum videns. Some successful expeditions recaptured portions of the Holy Land. First treated by R. Röhricht in his Die Kreuzzuge des Grafen Theobald von Navarra und Richard von Cornwallis nach dem heligen Landen. Thomas Fuller referred to it as Voyages 10 and 11 of the Holy Warre A crusade (1239–1240) led by Theobald I of Navarre, also referred to as Thibaut of Navarre or Theobald of Champagne. Part of the Barons' Crusade, 1239–1241. Among modern historians, René Grousset was among the first to discuss this crusade in his Histoire des croisades et du royaume franc de Jérusalem (1934-1936) Thomas Fuller referred to it as Voyage 10 of the Holy Warre. The Crusade of Richard of Cornwall and Simon de Montfort to Jaffa (1240–1241). Richard also held the title King of the Romans, and had a noteworthy biography written by Noël Denholm-Young. Usually referred to as part of the Barons' Crusade, 1239–1241. Thomas Fuller referred to it as Voyage 11 of the Holy Warre. The Crusade to Tzurulum (1239) was led by future Latin emperor Baldwin of Courtenay and conducted concurrently with the Barons' Crusade. In the military action, Baldwin besieged and captured Tzurulum, a Nicaean stronghold west of Constantinople.
Seventh Crusade	1248–1254	The Seventh Crusade was also known as the Crusade of Louis IX of France to the East, Sixth Crusade, or Louis IX's First Crusade. Early works on this crusade include Primat of Saint-Denis' Roman des rois (1274) and Jean de Joinville's Life of Saint Louis (1309). Thomas Fuller referred to it as Voyage 12 of the Holy Warre. Grousset's Histoire des croisades... and Peter Jackson's Seventh Crusade, 1244–1254: Sources and Documents (2007) provide the necessary historical background.
Crusade of Odo of Burgundy	1265–1266	An expedition of Odo, Count of Nevers, who led 50 knights to protect Acre from Mamluk sultan Baibars.
Crusade of 1267	1267	The Crusade of 1267 was an expedition from the Upper Rhine to counter the threat posed by Baibars.
Crusade of Charles of Anjou against Lucera	1268	The attack made by Charles I of Anjou on the Muslims at Lucera in conjunction with the Crusade against Conradin of 1268 (cf. Italian Crusades below).
Crusade of the Infants of Aragon	1269–1270	In the Crusade of the Infants of Aragon, or the Catalan Crusade, James I of Aragon joined forces with Abaqa, Mongol ruler of the Ilkhanate, to take a crusade to the Holy Land, but returned without engaging the Mamluks in light of their strength at Acre.
Eighth Crusade	1270	The Eighth Crusade, also known as the Crusade of Louis IX of France to Tunis or Seventh Crusade. Accompanied by Jean de Joinville who wrote the biography Life of Saint Louis (1309). Thomas Fuller referred to it as Voyage 31 of the Holy Warre.
Lord Edward's Crusade	1271–1272	Lord Edward's Crusade was led by the future Edward I of England, and is also known as the Crusade of Lord Edward of England, the Ninth Crusade, or the Last Crusade. It is often regarded as an extension of the Eighth Crusade (also called Seventh) due to its timing. Edward, later King of England, was accompanied by his wife Eleanor of Castile, who came to his aid after an assassination attempt. Discussed as part of the Eighth Crusade by Joseph François Michaud in Volume 3 of his seminal Histoire des Croisades (1812–1822).
Crusade of Henry of Mecklenburg	1275	Henry I, Lord of Mecklenburg (died 1302) went on either a crusade or pilgrimage to the Holy Land c. 1271-1275 and was captured by the Egyptians and held for 32 years. The only known reference to this is by Thomas Fuller in his Historie of the Holy Warre, where it is referred to as the Last Voyage.
Siege of Acre	1291	The Siege of Acre marked the loss of the Holy Land to the Mamluks, typically identifying the end of the traditional Crusades. The anonymous Les Gestes des Chiprois (Deeds of the Cypriots) contains one of two eyewitness accounts of the siege.

== Later Crusades (1291–1699) ==
The crusades continued in the Levant from the thirteenth through the 16th century. Principal references on this subject are Kenneth Setton's History of the Crusades, Volume III. The Fourteenth and Fifteen Centuries (1975), and two works by Norman Housley:The Later Crusades, 1274-1580: From Lyons to Alcazar (1992) and The Crusading Movement, 1274–1700 (1995). Barbara Tuchman's A Distant Mirror: The Calamitous 14th Century (1978) provides an interesting perspective on both the crusades and the general history of the era. A nineteenth-century reference often cited is Joseph François Michaud's Histoire des Croisades (1812–1822), translation by William Robson.

Crusade	Time	Description
Expedition of the Almogavars	1301–1311	The Expedition of the Almogavars consisted of campaigns of the Catalan Company, formed by veterans of the War of the Sicilian Vespers (the Almogavar) against the Anatolian beyliks. It concluded with the Catalan's taking control of the Duchy of Athens and Thebes.
Hospitaller Crusade	1306–1310	The Hospitaller Crusade, also known as the Hospitaller conquest of Rhodes, consolidated hold of the Knights Hospitaller on Rhodes. Documented by Hans Prutz in his Die Anfänge der Hospitaliter auf Rhodos, 1310–1355 (1908).
Crusade against the Catalan Grand Company	1330–1332	The Crusade against the Catalan Grand Company, also called the Anti-Catalan Crusade, was waged by Walter VI, Count of Brienne and titular Duke of Athens. In 1330, John XXII issued a papal bull and ordered prelates in Italy and Greece to preach for a crusade against the Catalan Grand Company. Shortly thereafter, Robert of Naples gave the crusade his support. The Venetians, however, renewed their treaty with the Catalans in 1331. By the summer, it was clear that the expedition had failed, and Walter returned to Brindisi, saddled with crippling debts.
Naval Crusade of the Holy League	1332–1333	A short-lived crusade led by the Holy League against the Aydinid Turkish fleet by Pietro Zeno, serving as balio of Negroponte. In 1332, a Turkish armada under Umur Bey attacked Negroponte, and Zeno bought them off with a large tribute. Zeno and Pietro da Canale were accused by Francesco Dandolo with arranging an anti-Turkish alliance. By the end of the year the Holy League (also known as the Naval League) "a union, society and league for the discomfiture of the Turks and the defence of the true faith", had been formally constituted. In 1334, Zeno took command of the league's fleet and defeated the fleet of the Beylik of Karasi at the battle of Adramyttion. Zeno later served as one of the leaders of the Smyrna Crusade of 1344.
Holy League of Clement VI	1343	A crusade proclaimed by Clement VI in 1343 that resulted in a naval attack on Smyrna the next year. The Grand Council of Venice elected Pietro Zeno as captain of the flotilla sent to assist the crusade against Aydinid-held Smyrna. Other crusader leaders included patriarch Henry of Asti, The crusade was a naval success and Smyrna was taken. Zeno was killed by Umur Bey's forces in an ambush while he and other crusaderswere attempting to celebrate mass in the no-man's-land between the battle lines.
Smyrna Crusade	1344	The first of the Smyrniote Crusades (1343–1351). The Smyrna Crusade began in 1344 with the naval victory of the Battle of Pallene and ended with an assault on Smyrna, capturing the harbour and the citadel but not the acropolis. Sometimes considered as part of the Holy League of Clement VI.
Crusade of Humbert II of Viennois	1346	The second of the Smyrniote Crusades. A second expedition under the command of Humbert II of Viennois with little to show other than a victory over the Turks at Mytilene. Described in the Book of Chivalry by Geoffroi de Charny. Also called the Second Smyrna Crusade.
Crusade against Francesco Ordelaffi	1355–1357	The Crusade against Francesco Ordelaffi was a campaign by Innocent IV and Cardinal Gil Álvarez Carrillo de Albornoz against Francesco II Ordelaffi in order to restore papal authority to central Italy. The pope's Angevin troops had some success against Ordelaffi through 1356, by mercenary troops sent by Bernabò Visconti allowed him to hold out until 1357.
Crusade of Peter I de Lusignan	1362–1365	Peter I of Cyprus (Peter I de Lusignan) was King of Cyprus and titular King of Jerusalem. He founded the chivalric Order of the Sword in 1347, dedicated to the recovery of Jerusalem, and attempted to convince nobles in Europe to mount a new crusade. His efforts were eventually merged with the Alexandrian Crusade.
Alexandrian Crusade	1365	The Alexandrian Crusade was an attack by Peter I of Cyprus that resulted in the destruction of Alexandria, but had little real impact. Accounts of the crusade was given by Guillaume de Machaut in his La Prise d'Alexandre (after 1369) and by Muslim historian al-Nuwayrī in his Kitāb al-Ilmām (1365–1374).
Crusade of Amadeus VI of Savoy or Savoyard crusade	1366–1367	Amadeus VI of Savoy (Amadeo), known as the Green Count of Savoy, launched the Savoyard crusade, a minor crusade against Thrace and Bulgaria. He attacked Ottoman sultan Murad I with 15 ships and 1,700 men in 1366 in order to aid his cousin, John V Palaiologos. Recounted by Romanian historian Nicolae Iorga in his work about French knight Philippe de Mézières (c. 1327 – 1405) and Eugene L. Cox's Green Count of Savoy (1967).
Mahdia Crusade	1390	Mahdia Crusade, also known as the Barbary Crusade or the Crusade of Louis II de Bourbon against Mahdia, was a Franco-Genoese military expedition in 1390 that led to the siege of Mahdia, a stronghold of the Barbary pirates. A work by Belgian court historian Jean Froissart called the Chronicles of England, France, and the Adjoining Countries (c. 1400), referred to as Froissart's Chronicles, includes an account of this crusade.
Crusade of Nicopolis	1396	Also known as the Battle of Nicopolis or the Crusade to Nicopolis. The crusader army of Hungarian, Croatian, Bulgarian, French, Serbian, Romanian and German force (assisted by the Venetian navy) was defeated by the Ottoman's at the Danubian fortress of Nicopolis, leading to the end of the Second Bulgarian Empire.
Crusade of Marshal Boucicaut to Constantinople	1399	In 1399, Boniface IX preached a crusade to Constantinople, and Jean II Le Maingre (Boucicaut) was the only respondent. His one-man crusade consisted of raids on Turkish towns along the Black Sea coast.
Crusade of Varna	1443–1444	The Crusade of Varna, also known as the Crusade to Varna, was an unsuccessful military campaign by the European monarchies to check the expansion of the Ottoman empire into Central Europe. The crusade was called by Eugene IV and led by Władysław III of Poland, John Hunyadi of Hungary, Voivode of Transylvania and Philip the Good, duke of Burgundy. The aftermath left the Ottomans free from further attempts to push it out of Europe.
Crusades to Recover Constantinople	1453–1460	New crusades called for after the loss of Constantinople to the Ottomans in 1453. Includes the Crusade of Nicholas V (later, Callixtus III) and the unrealized Crusade of Pius II. In 1453, pope Nicholas V planned a small crusade to recapture the city, reconfirmed by Callixtus III after Nicholas' death. Only John Hunyadi responded, defeating the Turks at Belgrade in 1456 before his untimely death. See Crusade of St. John of Capistrano (1456).
Genoese Crusade to defend Chios	1455–1457	This began after Mehmed II declared war on Chios and Rhodes, and a Genoese fleet was dispatched to defend the island.
Crusade of St. John of Capistrano	1456	Also known as the Siege of Belgrade of 1456, began after the fall of Constantinople in 1453 when Mehmet II set his sights on the Kingdom of Hungary. The Ottoman forces were defeated by an army led by Catholic priest John of Capistrano and John Hunyadi. Crusade of Nicholas V (1455–1456).
Occupation of Sporades	1457	Occupation of the northern Sporades islands by papal galleys.
Siege of Rhodes	1480	In 1480, an Ottoman fleet unsuccessfully began the Siege of Rhodes. The Ottoman army under the command of Mesih Pasha was defeated by the Knights Hospitaller garrison led by Pierre d'Aubusson. Gulielmus Caoursin, vice-chancellor of the Hospitaller, was also an eye-witness to the siege.
Anti-Turkish Crusade	1480–1481	A crusade of pope Sixtus IV against Mehmet II to protect southern Italy. Primarily consisted of the Crusade of Otranto. In 1481, there was a crusade to recapture the city after the Ottoman invasion of Otranto. The citizens, killed by the Ottomans for refusing to convert to Islam, are known as the martyrs of Otranto.
Spanish Crusade in North Africa	1499–1510	Following the end of Muslim rule in Hispania, a number of cities were recaptured including: Melilla (1497), Mers el-Kebir (1505), Canary Islands (1508), Oran (1509), Rock of Algiers, Bougie and Tripoli (1510).
Siege of Rhodes	1522	The Siege of Rhodes was the second and ultimately successful attempt by the Ottoman empire to expel the Knights Hospitaller from their island stronghold of Rhodes.
Crusade of the Emperor Charles V to Tunis	1535	Also known as the Conquest of Tunis. In 1535, Tunis, then under the control of the Ottoman empire, was captured by emperor Charles V and his allies.
Crusade of the Emperor Charles V to Algiers	1541	Also known as the Algiers Expedition, was an unsuccessful attempt to dislodge to Ottomans from Algiers.
Spanish Crusade to Mahdia	1550	Also known as the Capture of Mahdia. A Spanish naval expedition supported by the Knights of Malta under Claude de la Sengle, besieged and captured the Ottoman stronghold of Mahdia. Mahdia was abandoned by Spain three years later, with its fortifications demolished to avoid reoccupation of the city.
Crusade of King Sebastian of Portugal to Morocco	1578	Also known as the Battle of Alcácer Quibir or the Battle of Three Kings. The battle was between the army of deposed Moroccan sultan Abu Abdallah Mohammed II allied with Sebastian I of Portugal, against a large Moroccan army under the new sultan Abd Al-Malik I who was allied with the Ottomans. Al-Malik and the Ottomans won a decisive victory.
Great Turkish War	1683–1699	The Great Turkish War, also known as The Fourteenth Crusade, was a crusade undertaken by the Holy League of Pope Innocent XI against the Ottoman Empire which met with an unprecedented Crusader success leading to the recovery of most of Hungary, Transylvania, Podolia and Morea to Christian rule and the beginning of the decline of the Ottoman Caliphate. The war is referred to as Felaket Seneleri meaning 'The Disaster Years' by Ottoman Turkish historians.

== Crusades against the Byzantine Empire ==
Crusades against the Byzantine empire began shortly after the First Crusade and continued throughout its existence. These include the following. There had been similar crusades against other states of the Byzantine commonwealth.

Crusade	Time	Description
Crusade of Bohemond of Taranto	1107–1108	Also known as Bohemond's Crusade. A campaign led by Bohemond of Taranto against the Byzantine empire that ended with the Treaty of Devol.
Crusading Project against Byzantium	1149–1150	This was an effort by Roger II of Sicily and Louis VII of France to aid the East and exact revenge on the Greeks after the Second Crusade.
Fourth Crusade	1202–1204	Also known as the Unholy Crusade. See details above.
Crusade against the Bulgars	1205	This was a call for a crusade against Kaloyan, king of the Bulgarians, by Renier of Trit, duke of Philippopolis. Their offense was that they had aligned themselves with enemies of the Cross of Christ, the Bogomils and Paulicians. Nothing came of the request. This and other aspects of the eastern Byzantine commonwealth were exhaustively studied by contemporary Russian historian Dimitri Obolensky.
Crusade of William VI of Montferrat	1225	A minor crusade of William VI of Montferrat to support his claims to the throne of Thessalonica (rarely mentioned). Pope Honorius III called for a crusade to recapture the kingdom with limited response.
Anti-Byzantine Crusades	1261–1320	This included three attempts to regain the Byzantine empire from the Palaiologos dynasty. The loss of Constantinople in 1261 happened during a papal interregnum, and the next year the newly-seated Urban IV authorized a crusade to retake the city. Nothing beyond the defeat of the Byzantines at the naval battle of Settepozzi in 1263. Urban IV renewed his call for crusade in 1264, for the succor of the Morea, but to no avail. In 1281, Charles I of Anjou, Philip of Courtenay and the Venetians planned an incursion into the Byzantine Empire for the recapture of Constantinople. This was blessed by Martin IV, labeling it a crusade. This was thwarted by the war of the Sicilian Vespers. After the Peace of Caltabellotta, the final anti-Byzantine crusade was hatched. Charles of Valois, the husband of Catherine of Courtenay, titular Latin empress of Constantinople, sought to use the Catalan Grand Company to advance his goals, but the company proved unable to effectively organize.
Crusade against Vidin	1365	Linked to wider plans for a crusade against the Ottoman Empire, Louis I of Hungary occupied the Tsardom of Vidin.

== Crusades also referred to as pilgrimages ==
Some pilgrimages are referred to as crusades, especially if the journey resulted in some military activity. Some examples include the following.

Crusade	Time	Description
Norwegian Crusade	1107–1110	The Norwegian Crusade, also known as the Crusade of Sigurd Jorsalfar. See above.
Crusade or Pilgrimage of Fulk V of Anjou	1120–1122	The Crusade or Pilgrimage of Fulk V of Anjou. The future king of Jerusalem traveled to the Holy Land and joined the Knights Templar, according to Ordoric Vitalis' Historia Ecclesiastica (c. 1141).
Pilgrimage of Rognvald Kali Kolsson	1151–1153	The Pilgrimage of Rognvald Kali Kolsson was also known as the Crusade of Rognvald Kali Kolsson. In 1151, Rognvald set out on a pilgrimage to the Holy Land as described in the Orkneyinga saga. The earl's party left Orkney in the late summer of 1151 in fifteen ships, with six sailing to Jerusalem while Rognvald stoppeded in Narbonne. After visiting Jerusalem, the party returned via Constantinople, where they were received by the emperor, then sailed to Apulia where they took horses for the journey to Rome, arriving back in Orkney in time for Christmas 1153.
Crusade or Pilgrimage of Henry the Lion	1172	A pilgrimage to Jerusalem by Henry the Lion documented by Arnold of Lübeck in his Chronicae Slavorum (1209), often referred to as a crusade.
Crusade of Henry of Mecklenburg	1275	Henry I, Lord of Mechlenburg (died 1302) went on a crusade or pilgrimage to the Holy Land c. 1275 and was captured by the Egyptians and held for 32 years. The only know reference to this is by Thomas Fuller in his Historie of the Holy Warre, where it is referred to as the Last Voyage.

== Popular Crusades ==
The Popular Crusades were generated by enthusiasm for crusading, but unsanctioned by the Church.

Crusade	Time	Description
People's Crusade	1096	The People's Crusade (1096). A prelude to the First Crusade led by Peter the Hermit. See above.
Children's Crusade	1212	The Children's Crusade was a failed Popular Crusade by the West to regain the Holy Land. The traditional narrative includes some factual and some mythical events including visions by a French boy and a German boy, an intention to peacefully convert Muslims to Christianity, bands of children marching to Italy, and children being sold into slavery. Thomas Fuller referred to it as a Holy war in his Historie of the Holy Warre.
First Shepherds' Crusade	1251	The First Shepherds' Crusade was a popular crusade also known as the Crusade of the Pastoreaux. The movement was aimed at rescuing Louis IX during his imprisonment during the Seventh Crusade. The group was dispersed in Paris.
Crusade of the Poor	1309	The Crusade of the Poor was also known as the Crusade of 1309 or the Shepards' Crusade of 1309. A popular crusade that began with the unfulfilled Crusade of Clement V (see below).
Second Shepherds' Crusade	1320	The Second Shepherds' Crusade (1320), also known as the Pastoreaux of 1320, it was the last of the popular crusades.

== Northern Crusades ==
The Northern Crusades (1150–1560), also known as Baltic Crusades, occurred in northern Europe at the same time as the traditional crusades.

Crusade	Time	Description
Wendish Crusade	1147	The Wendish Crusade was the first of the Northern Crusades, usually associated with the Second Crusade. A military campaign by the Holy Roman Empire and directed against the Polabian Slavs, or Wends.
Swedish Crusades	1150s–1293	The Swedish Crusades consisted of the First Swedish Crusade (1150s), likely fictional, the Second Swedish Crusade (13th century), and the Third Swedish Crusade (1293).
Drenthe Crusade	1228–1232	It was a papal-approved military campaign launched against Drenthe in 1228. The crusade was led by Willibrand, Bishop of Utrecht, commanding a Frisian army. Willibrand's crusade ended inconclusively in 1232.
Danish Crusades	1191, 1293	The Danish Crusades (1191, 1293). The Danes made at least three crusades to Finland. The first is from 1187 when crusader Esbern Snare mentioned in his christmas feast speech a major victory from the Finns. Two next known crusades were made in 1191 and in 1202. The latter one was led by the Bishop of Lund, Anders Sunesen, with his brother. The Danes also participated in the Livonian Crusades.
Livonian Crusades	1193–1287	The Livonian Crusades are the various Christianization campaigns in the area constituting modern Lithuania, Latvia and Estonia following the 1193 call of Celestine III for a crusade against pagans in Northern Europe. It was conducted mostly by Germans from the Holy Roman Empire and Danes, and consisted of four parts: Crusades against the Livonians (1198–1209); Conquest of the Estonian Hinderland (1208–1226); Crusades against the Oeselians (1206–1261); Crusade against Curonians (1242–1267); and, Crusade against Semigallians (1219–1290). The principal original sources on these crusades are the Livonian Rhymed Chronicle and the Livonian Chronicle of Henry.
Crusades against Livonians	1198–1209	The Crusades against Livonians (1198–1209). When peaceful means of conversion failed to convert the Livonians, bishop Berthold of Hanover arrived with a large contingent of crusaders in 1198. Berthold was surrounded soon after and killed, his forces defeated. To avenge Berthold's death, Innocent III then issued a bull declaring a crusade against the Livonians. Albert of Riga arrived the following year with a large force and in 1202, formed the Livonian Brothers of the Sword to aid in the conversion of the pagans. The Livonians led by Caupo of Turaida rebelled against the crusaders. Caupo's forces were defeated in 1206, and the Livonians were declared to be converted. Albert invaded with the forces of the Order in 1209, and the Livonians under duke Visvaldis were forced to submit to Albert.
Conquest of the Estonian Hinderland	1208–1226	The crusaders began operations against the Estonians in 1208, with the help of the newly converted Livonians. From 1208 to 1227, war parties rampaged through Estonia. A truce was established from 1213 to 1215, but the Estonians were unable to develop into a centralized state. They were led by Lembitu of Lehola who was killed along with Caupo of Turaida (fighting for the crusaders), at the 1217 battle of St. Matthew's Day, a crushing defeat for the Estonians. The Chronicle of Henry of Livonia relates how in 1226, papal legate William of Modena successfully mediated peace in the area.
Crusades against the Oeselians	1206–1261	The Estonian region of Saaremaa, whose occupants were known as Oeselians, resisted the German crusaders, maintaining war fleets that continued to raid Denmark and Sweden. Danish armies led by Valdemar II of Denmark failed in Saaremaa in 1206 and 1222, as did John I of Sweden in 1220. The Livonian Brothers of the Sword finally succeeding in converting the Oeselians to Christianity in 1226 after failing in 1216. After regressing, the Oeselians once again accepted Christianity in 1241, and signed a treaty in 1255. Conflict returned in 1261 as the Oeselians once more renounced Christianity and killed all the occupying Germans. A final peace treaty was imposed that year by the Livonian Order, a branch of the Teutonic Order.
Crusade against Curonians	1242–1267	After the defeat of the Estonians in 1126 and the Oeselians in 1241, the crusade moved against the Curonians who had attacked Riga in 1210 and 1228. Those in the north accepted peace with the Germans in 1230, but in the south the fighting continued. In 1260, the Curonians fought alongside the crusaders in the battle of Durbe, abandoning them in the midst of battle, allowing the Lithuanians to gain victory over the Livonian Order and Teutonic Knights. The Curonians were finally subdued in 1267 and the land partitioned. This was documented by Peter of Dusburg in his 1326 work Chronicon terrae Prussiae.
Crusade against Semigallians	1219–1290	According to the Livonian Chronicle of Henry, the Semigallians formed an alliance with Albert of Riga against the Livonians before 1203, and received military support to hold back Lithuanian attacks in 1205. In 1219, this alliance was shattereded after a crusader invasion in Semigallia. Duke Viestards then formed an alliance with Lithuanians and Curonians. In 1228, Semigallians and Curonians attacked the main crusader stronghold, with the crusaders taking revenge and invaded Semigallia. In 1236, Semigallians attacked crusaders retreating to Riga after the battle of Saule, but by 1254, the Semigallians had been subdued by the Livonian Order. In 1270, the Semigallians joined Lithuanian Grand Duke Traidenis in an attack on Livonia and Saaremaa. During the battle of Karuse, the Livonian Order was defeated, and its master Otto von Lutterberg killed. In 1287, a force of Semigallians attacked a crusader stronghold in Ikšķile and plundered nearby lands. As they returned to Semigallia, they defeated the crusaders at the battle of Garoza, the last such victory. The Semigallians were finally subdued by 1290.
Prussian Crusades	1222–1274	The Prussian Crusades were a series of 13th-century campaigns of Catholic crusaders, primarily led by the Teutonic Knights, to Christianize the pagan Old Prussians. These include the Crusade of 1222–1223, the First Prussian Uprising of 1242–1249, and the Great Prussian Uprising of 1260–1274.
Lithuanian Crusades	1284–1435	The Lithuanian Crusades (1284–1435) were a series of economic Christian colonization campaigns by the Teutonic Order and the Livonian Order under the religious pretext of forcibly Christianizing the pagan Grand Duchy of Lithuania to Roman Catholicism. (cf. Italian Wikipedia, Crociata lituana) Louis I of Hungary launched his own crusade against the Lithuanians in 1344.
Crusade of Magnus Eriksson	1347–1351	The Crusade of King Magnus Eriksson of Sweden against Novgorod began in 1348, when Magnus led a crusade, marching up the Neva, converting the tribes along that river, and briefly capturing the fortress of Orekhov. The Novgorodians retook the fortress in 1349 after a seven-month siege, and Magnus fell back, partially due to the ravages of the plague. He spent much of 1351 unsuccessfully seeking support for further crusading action among the German cities.

== Crusades against Mongol-Tatar states ==
Crusade	Time	Description
Crusade against the Mongols	1241	The Crusade against the Mongols was led by Conrad IV of Germany and is also known as the Anti-Mongol Crusade of 1241. British historian Peter Jackson documented this crusade in his study Crusade against the Mongols (1241).
Crusade to Protect Caffa	1345	During the Siege of Caffa, Pope Clement VI called for a crusade to protect the city. He promised indulgences to the Genoese defenders and called for the crusaders of the Smyrniote crusades like Humbert II of Viennois to join it with little effect. Jani Beg failed to take the city.
Vytautas' Crusade against the Tatars	1399	After securing the support of the Polish king Jogaila, Pope Boniface IX authorized Vytautas' crusade against the Tatars in Poland, Lithuania, Rus', Podillia, and Moldavia. Even though the crusader were defeated at the Battle of the Vorskla River, Lithuania could hold on their previous territorial gains and solidified its reputation as a Christianized state and defender of Christendom.

== Crusades in the Iberian Peninsula ==
Crusades in the Iberian peninsula, known as the Reconquista, from 722 to 1492.

Between 1113 and 1115, the Mallorca Crusade led by the Republic of Pisa took place which is also known as the Balearic Islands Expedition. The Granada War (1482–1491) was a series of military campaigns between 1482 and 1491, during the reign of Isabella I of Castile and Ferdinand II of Aragon, against the Emirate of Granada. It ended with the defeat of Granada and its annexation by Castile, ending Islamic rule on the Iberian peninsula.

== Crusades against heretics ==
The Crusades against Christian heretics and schismatics include the following.

Crusade	Time	Description
Albigensian Crusade	1209–1229	The Albigensian Crusade, or Cathar Crusade, was the first of the so-called religious crusades and was conducted against the Cathars in southern France. The 20-year campaign was successful. One of the first actions, the massacre at Béziers, helped earn the crusade the title as "one of the most conclusive cases of genocide in religious history." After the military phase, the inquisition conducted by Gregory IX in 1234 all but eliminated the Cathars. Contemporaneous chronicles of the crusade include Peter of Vaux de Cernay's Historia Albigensis and Guillaume de Puylaurens' Cronica, both of which appear Guizot's Collection des mémoires relatifs à l'histoire de France (1823–1835). Thomas Fuller referred to it as a Holy war in his Historie of the Holy Warre (1639).
Bogomils Crusades	1234, 1252	The Bogomils Crusades were crusades against the Bogomils were called for in 1234 by Gregory IX and in 1252 by Innocent IV.
Crusades against the Bosnian Heritics	1235, 1241	The Crusades against the Bosnian Heritics, also known as the Bosnian Crusades. Fought against unspecified "heretics", the action was essentially a war of conquest by Hungarian prince Coloman of Galicia against the Banate of Bosnia, sanctioned as a crusade by Gregory IX. The would-be crusaders only succeeded in conquering peripheral parts of the country.
The Great Schism and the Crusades	1382–1387	The Great (or Western) Schism within the Catholic Church from 1378 to 1417 led to a number of minor crusades included that against Charles III of Naples (1382; see below); the Despenser's Crusade (1383); and the crusade of John of Gaunt (1387). The work by Walter Ullmann on the subject is a standard reference. Despenser's Crusade, also known as the Norwich Crusade, was a military expedition led by Henry le Despenser in 1383 in order to assist Ghent in its struggle against the supporters of antipope Clement VII. A crusade associated with the Great Schism. John of Gaunt led an unsuccessful crusade against Henry of Trastámara to claim the throne of Castile by right of his wife Constance of Castile in 1387. A crusade associated with the Great Schism.
Sigismund's crusade against Bosnia	1405–1408	Sigismund, backed by the Pope, declared a crusade against Bosnian "Manicheans and Arians". In 1408, Tvrtko II of Bosnia was captured and 128 noblemen were executed by Sigismund but he was unable to conquer the Kingdom of Bosnia.
Crusades against the Hussites	1420–1431	The five crusades from the Hussite Wars known as the Anti-Hussite Crusades. The First Anti-Hussite Crusade (1420). Pope Martin V issued a bull in 1420 proclaiming a crusade "for the destruction of the Wycliffites, Hussites and all other heretics in Bohemia". Holy Roman Emperor Sigismund and many German princes laid siege to Prague with an army of crusaders from all parts of Europe, largely consisting of adventurers attracted by the hope of pillage. Sigismund was defeated that same year at the battle of Vítkov Hill. The Second Anti-Hussite Crusade (1421–1422). After the Hussite victory in 1420, a priest named Jan Želivský obtained authority over Prague. In 1421, a new crusade against the Hussites was undertaken, laying siege to the town of Žatec. Sigismund arrived in Bohemia at the end of 1421, but was decisively defeated at the battle of Německý Brod in 1422. The Third Anti-Hussite Crusade (1423–1424). Innocent IV called a new crusade against Bohemia, but it was a complete failure. Poles and Lithuanians did not wish to attack the Czechs, the Germans were hampered by internal discord, and Eric VII of Denmark, intending to take part in the crusade, soon returned to Scandinavia. Sigismund Korybut, governor of Bohemia, helped broker the peace in 1424. The Fourth Anti-Hussite Crusade (1426–1428). In 1426, the Hussites were attacked again by foreign forces. Hussite forces, led by Sigismund Korybut and Prokop the Great, defeated the invaders in the battle of Aussig of 1426. Despite this, the pope believed that the Hussites were weakened and proclaimed a fourth crusade in 1427. Cardinal Henry Beaufort was appointed leader of the crusader forces. The crusaders were defeated at the battle of Tachov that same year. Korybut was imprisoned in 1427 for conspiring to surrender Hussite forces to the emperor Sigismund. He was released in 1428, and participated in the Hussite invasion of Silesia. The Fifth Anti-Hussite Crusade (1431). In 1431, Frederick I, Elector of Brandenburg and papal legate cardinal Julian Cesarini led a crusader army against Bohemia. The defending army led by Prokop the Great, supplemented by Polish Hussites, defeated the crusaders at the battle of Domažlice that same year.
Waldensian Crusade in the Dauphine	1487–1491	The Waldensian Crusade in the Dauphine was a crusade against the Waldensians (Vaudois), a sect regarded as heretics, beginning with the burning at the stake of 80 Waldensians in 1211. In 1487, Innocent VIII issued a bull for the extermination of the heresies of the Vaudois. Alberto de' Capitanei organized a crusade and launched an offensive against the Vaudois in Dauphiné and Piedmont. Charles I, Duke of Savoy, intervened in order to save his territories from further turmoil and promised the Vaudois peace, which did not occur before the offensive had devastated the area. Angelo Carletti di Chivasso brought about a peaceful agreement between the parties, which was short-lived as attested by the Mérindol massacre of 1545, with persecution continuing until after the French Revolution.

== Political Crusades ==
Political crusades include the following.

Crusade	Time	Description
Political Crusade against Roger II of Sicily	1127–1135	Called the First Political Crusade, it began in 1127 when Honorius II, suspicious of the growth of Norman power in southern Italy, and at Capua in December, the pope preached a crusade against Roger II of Sicily. Upon the death of Honorius in 1130, Anacletus II and Innocent II were both claimants to the papal throne. Roger supported the antipope Anacletus. In 1135, Innocent II offered Crusader indulgences to those who fought his enemies. There is no evidence that any military action was taken, but the action is viewed as a harbinger for the political crusades of the 13th century.
Crusade against Markward von Anweiler	1199	The second of the so-called political crusades, that the papacy regarded as a pre-condition to a fourth crusade. In 1199, Innocent III declared a crusade against Markward von Anweiler, Imperial seneschal and regent of the Kingdom of Sicily, who opposed papal claims on the regency of Sicily. Markward was regarded by Innocent as "worse than the infidels", granting those few who fought against him crusader indulgences. Among those taking arms was Walter III of Brienne who wished to secure his claim to Taranto by virtue of his marriage to Elvira of Sicily. The need for the crusade ended with Markward's death in 1202.
Papal Quarrel with John Lackland	1208	The conflict between John of England and Innocent III that led to John's excommunication has been referred to as a crusade.
Political Crusade in England	1215–1217	Two crusades were declared by Henry III of England against his rebellious subjects. The first began with a French knight Savari de Mauléon who had been in service to Henry's predecessor, John of England, in the First Barons' War. The pope, Innocent III, had described Savari as crucesignatus pro defense Regni Anglie, setting the stage for Henry to take the cross, with the inherent protections from Rome. The conflict was finally settled in 1217 with the Treaty of Lambeth between Henry and Louis VIII of France.
Gregory IX's Crusade against Frederick II	1228–1230	The Crusade against Frederick II, also known as the War of the Keys. Efforts of pope Gregory IX against Frederick II. See also references under the Sixth Crusade above.
Crusade against the Stedinger	1233–1234	Also known as the Stedinger Crusade. The Stedinger were free farmers whose grievances over taxes and property rights turned into full-scale revolt. A papal-sanctioned crusade was called against the rebels. In the campaign of 1233, the small crusading army was defeated. In a follow-up campaign of 1234, a much larger crusader army was victorious.
Innocent IV's Crusade against Frederick II	1248	Pope Innocent IV's Crusade against Frederick II (1248). The conflict between the pope and the emperor began with the apostolic letter Ad apostolicae dignitatis apicem in 1245 and was not resolved until Frederick's death in 1250.
Crusade against Conrad IV	1250	A crusade against Conrad IV of Germany that was a continuation of the crusade against his father Frederick II.
Another Political Crusade in England	1263–1265	The second of Henry III's political crusades began with the Second Barons' War in 1263. Again a crusade was declared by Henry III of England against his enemies, with consent two papal legates to England. The death of Simon de Montfort in 1265 put an end to this rebellion.
Crusade against the Arogonese	1284–1285	Also known as the Arogonese Crusade, or Crusade of Aragon, was part of the War of the Sicilian Vespers. The crusade was declared by Martin IV against Peter III of Aragon in 1284 and was conducted by Philip III of France. The crusade effectively ended with a French loss at the battle of the Col de Panissars in 1265. The wars of the Sician Vespers continued until 1302.
Crusade against the Emperor Louis IV	1328–1329	The Crusade against the Emperor Louis IV was a crusade against Louis IV, Holy Roman Emperor, also called the Crusade against Ludwig IV of Bavaria. Pope John XXII declared a crusade against Louis shortly after his coronation in 1328. Louis responded by installing an antipope, Nicholas V, declaring John deposed because of heresy. The crusade against Louis was renewed in 1329, and Robert of Naples sent forces against Louis and his ally Frederick II of Sicily but little came of it. Louis was also a protector of the Teutonic Knights, bestowing on the order a privilege to conquer Lithuania and Russia.

== Italian Crusades ==
Crusades against Italian republics and cities, and Sicily. These are documented in the work by British historian Norman Housley, The Italian Crusades: The Papal-Angevin Alliance and the Crusades Against Christian Lay Powers, 1254-1343 (1982).

Crusade	Time	Description
Crusade against Roger II of Sicily	1127–1135	See Political Crusades above.
Crusade against Markward von Anweiler	1198	Following the death of Constance I of Sicily, a rebellion by German warlords like Markward von Anweiler and local Muslims broke out against Frederick I who was under the custody of Pope Innocent III.
War of the Keys	1229	The War of the Keys were conflicts between John of Brienne and his son-in-law Frederick II in Italy.
Genoese Crusade against Savona and Albenga	1240	A minor conflict summoned to suppress supporters of Frederick II against Savona and Albenga.
Crusade against Sicily	1248	Actions taken by Innocent IV after Frederick II's defeat at the battle of Parma.
Crusade against Manfred of Sicily	1255–1266	The first crusade against Manfred of Sicily, the illegitimate son of Frederick II, was preached in 1255. The second was declared after Manfred's coronation as the King of Sicily in 1258. He was excommunicated by Innocent IV and indulgences continued to be enjoyed by those crusaders until his death at the hands of Charles I of Anjou, brother of Louis IX, at the battle of Benevento of 1266.
Crusade against Ezzelino III da Romano	1256	A crusade preached by Innocent IV in Venice against the tyrant Ezzelino III da Romano and his son Alberico da Romano. Innocent had excommunicated the father, who won an initial victory over the crusaders. Wounded in the battle of Cassano d'Adda of 1259, Ezzelino killed himself by self-neglect while imprisoned. The reaction to this crusade left no doubt that crusades against domestic enemies of the Church were every bit as serious as those against Muslims. Ezzelino was a "son of perdition" in Dante's Inferno, his soul consigned to Hell.
Crusade against Conradin	1268	Conradin (1252–1268) was nominal king of Jerusalem as the son of Conrad IV of Germany. He attempted to get control of the Kingdom of Sicily, causing Charles I of Anjou to declare a crusade against him. Conradin joined with Muslim forces at Lucera and was defeated by Charles at Tagliacozzo and later beheaded.
Crusade against Frederick III of Sicily	1298, 1299, 1302	The Crusade against Frederick III of Sicily was the final round of the War of the Sicilian Vespers in which pope Boniface VIII attempted to dislodge Frederick. Frederick's position was solidified by the Peace of Caltabellotta in 1302, after which the crusaders were unable to dislodge him.
Crusade against the Colonna Cardinals	1298	The Crusade against the Colonna Cardinals was the campaign of Boniface VIII against the Colonna family.
Crusade against the Venetians	1309	It was a dispute over the succession of Azzo VIII d'Este, Marquis of Ferrara.
Anti-Ghibelline Crusades	1321–1322	These were crusades preached against Matteo I Visconti and his son Galeazzo I Visconti in 1321 and renewed in 1325 against Aldobrandino II d'Este and his son Obizzo III d'Este and supporters in Ferrara. Angevin forces carried out the fighting for these crusades.
Crusade against Frederico I of Montefeltro	1321–1322	The Crusade against Frederico I of Montefeltro was a crusade proclaimed by John XXII in 1321 against Federico I, Count of Montefeltro (1296–1322), and his brothers to regain possession of the March of Ancona and Duchy of Spoleto. Malatesta da Verucchio, ruler of Rimini, supported by the commune of Perugia, killed Federico and captured his brothers in 1322.
Crusade against Bernabò Visconti	1362–1363	Urban V called for a crusade against Bernabò Visconti in 1362–1363 to recover Bologna for the papacy.
Crusade against Charles III of Naples	1382	Charles Durazzo became Charles III as king of Naples and titular king of Jerusalem after having his cousin Joanna I of Naples strangled in jail. In 1382 Clement VII granted crusade indulgences to Louis I of Anjou and others to dethrone Charles. A crusade associated with the Great Schism.
Crusade against Ladislaus of Naples	1411	John XXIII declared a crusade against Ladislaus of Naples for his occupation of Rome. A crusade associated with the Great Schism.
Crusade against Frederick of Naples	1501	Became the Second Italian War. Pope Alexander VI deposed Frederick of Naples accusing him of plotting with the Ottoman Empire. The bull split Naples between Louis XII of France and the Catholic Monarchs of Spain but the coalition collapsed starting the Third Italian War.

== Planned Crusades ==
In the 14th century, much work was done to call for a new crusade to recapture Jerusalem. This includes proposals by Benedetto Accolti, Martin Luther's On War Against the Turk, Francis Bacon's Advertisement Touching on a Holy Warre, and Leibnitz' Project de conquête l'Egypte présenté à Louis XIV. In addition, there were other crusades that did not leave the planning stage, including the following.

Crusade	Time	Description
Crusade of Emperor Henry IV	1103	It was a planned crusade planned by Holy Roman Emperor Henry IV that never materialized.
Crusade of Conrad III	1124	The crusade was an expedition by Conrad III of Germany discussed by Ekkehard of Aura in his Chronicon universale.
Crusade against John III Doukas Vatatzes	1235–1237	Following the Siege of Constantinople in 1235, Pope Gregory IX called for a crusade against John III Doukas Vatatzes. In 1237, he notified John III that a crusader army would soon arrive. In reaction to this, John III formed an alliance with Frederick II. Additionally, a crusade against Bulgarian Tsar Ivan Asen II was planned to be led by Béla IV of Hungary.
Crusade Preached against the Mongols	1240–1280	Various popes preached for a crusade against the Mongols and sometimes their "schismatic" Russian vassals. Ottokar II of Bohemia was interested in a crusade and the Pope Alexander IV confirmed all holdings of the Teutonic Order claimed or given by the Rus' and Tatars.
Second Crusade against Bosnia	c. 1245–1248	After the limited success of the first Bosnian Crusade, the pope called for a new crusade by Hungary but abandoned the plans to reevaluate the situation in Bosnia in 1248.
Daniel of Galicia	1252–1257	Daniel of Galicia hoped to gain military assistence against the Mongols by becoming King of Ruthenia in 1253. Negotiations with the papacy failed and in 1257 Pope Alexander IV called for a crusade against the "schismatic Russians".
Crusade Preached against the Mongols in Syria	1260	After the Mongol takeover of Aleppo in 1260, the Franks in the kingdom called on Alexander IV and Charles I of Anjou for help. The pope issued the bull Audiat orbis calling for a crusade against the Mongols and excommunicating Bohemond VI of Antioch for cooperating with the invaders. The abbot Benedict of Alignan was tasked with organizing the crusade, preaching it in Acre. The defeat of the Mongols at the battle of Ain Jalut in 1260 removed the Mongol threat, at the cost of an increased threat from the Mamluks.
Plans for a Joint Latin-Greek Crusade	1274–1276	The Second Council of Lyon in 1274 thwarted Charles I of Anjou's hopes of leading a new crusade. Nevertheless, Gregory X was favorable to a proposal from Michael VIII Palaiologos for a crusade against the Turks to restore the ancient Christian cities of Anatolia. Gregory's death in 1276), put an end to such talks.
Crusade of the Genoese Women	1300	Boniface VIII declared 1300 a Jubilee Year, and crusading planning was generated by enthusiasm for the celebration. The women of Genoa intended to go on crusade, to the point of designing and building armored suits.
Crusade of Clement V	1309	It was a crusade, or passagium generale, against the Mamluks was planned by pope Clement V. The crusade was to be executed by the Knights Hospitaller under Foulques de Villaret, fresh from his successes at Rhodes, and reduced to a passagium. Instead, members of the lower classes of England, France and Germany formed a peasant army, and executed the Crusade of the Poor.
Crusade of Philip V	1317–1322	There were crusades planned for or proposed during the Avignon Papacy, involving three successive kings of France, Philip V, Charles IV and Philip VI. The Crusade of Philip V (1317–1322) was a planned crusade by Philip V of France. At the Council of Vienne in 1312, Philip's father Philip IV of France and pope John XXII had agreed to a new crusade. John continued to assure the Armenians that a crusade would soon happen, but instead turned his energies against Ludwig IV of Bavaria and to the Second Shepherds' Crusade.
Crusade of Charles IV	1322–1328	A planned crusade was planned by Charles IV of France, continuing the interest expressed by his brother Philip V. Charles entrusted his uncle Charles of Valois to negotiate the terms, but conflicts with England took precedence. Nothing ever became of the proposed conflict and the idea died with Charles IV in 1328.
Crusade of Philip VI	1330–1332	An anonymous document Directorium ad passagium faciendum proposed an extensive crusade to Philip VI of France in 1330 or 1332. The proposal was for the conquest of the Holy Land, the Byzantine empire and Russia, In RHC Documents arméniens, Volume 2.IV.
Crusade to defend Poland	1340	Pope Benedict XII informed king Casimir III that he instructed bishops to preach for a crusade to defend Poland from a Mongol invasion. He did not mention the crusade plans when meeting an envoy of Özbeg Khan and promised that he would induce Hungary and Poland to compensate any damage to the Golden Horde. The eventual invasion 1341 was largely ineffective.
Crusade of Urban V	1363	In 1363, John II of France and Peter I of Cyprus planned a crusade against the Turks in 1363 to be led by the two kings and Cardinal Hélie de Talleyrand. Assembling the army proved an impossible task, and John returned to prison in England. He died in London on 8 April 1364. Plans for a crusade against the Turks was also discussed in 1365–6 which would involve into the Alexandrian Crusade led by Peter I and the Savoyard crusade.
Crusade of Joan of Arc	1430	In 1430, Joan of Arc threatened to lead a crusading army against the Hussites unless they returned to the Catholic Church. This followed Martin V's threat to the Hussites and the subsequent Fourth Anti-Hussite Crusade.
Crusade of Pius II	1464	At age 60, Pius II took the cross in 1464 and departed for Ancona where he was to meet a small Venetian fleet to attack the Turks. Pius died before the fleet arrived. Nevertheless, a fresco of the pope by Bernardino di Pinturicchio depicts an idealized (and fictional) version of his launching the crusade (Fresco #10, Pope Pius II Arrives in Ancona). The Pope later wedded Sophia Palaiologina to Ivan III of Russia in attempt to win Muscovy as an ally for a crusade against the Ottomans.
Crusade of Charles VIII	1494	Charles VIII of France planned a crusade on Constantinople during his invasion of Naples.

== Consolidated list ==
The consolidated list of the Crusades to the Holy Land from 1095 through 1578 is as follows.

Eleventh century

- First Crusade (1095–1099)
- People's Crusade (1096)

Twelfth century

- Crusade of 1101 (1101–1102) (Crusade of the Faint-Hearted)
- Crusade of Emperor Henry IV (1103)
- Crusade of Bohemond of Taranto (1107–1108)
- Norwegian Crusade (1107–1110) (Crusade of Sigurd Jorsalfar)
- Mallorca Crusade (1113–1115) (Balearic Islands Expedition)
- Crusade or Pilgrimage of Fulk V of Anjou (1120–1122)
- Venetian Crusade (1122–1124) (Crusade of Calixtus II)
- Crusade of Conrad III (1124)
- Political Crusade against Roger II of Sicily (1127–1135)
- Crusade of 1129 (Damascus Crusade)
- Second Crusade (1147–1150)
- Wendish Crusade (1147)
- Crusading Project against Byzantium (1149–1150)
- Pilgrimage of Rognvald Kali Kolsson (1151–1153) (Crusade of Rognvald Kali Kolsson)
- Crusader Invasions of Egypt (1154–1169)
- Swedish Crusades (1150s–1293)
- Crusade or Pilgrimage of Henry the Lion (1172)
- Crusade to the East of Philip of Flanders (1177)
- Third Crusade (1189–1192)
- Danish Crusades (1191, 1293)
- Livonian Crusades (1193–1287)
- Crusade of Emperor Henry VI (1197–1198)
- Crusades against Livonians (1198–1209)
- Crusade against Markward von Anweiler (1199)

Thirteenth century

- Fourth Crusade (1202–1204) (Unholy Crusade)
- Crusade against the Bulgars (1205)
- Crusades against the Oeselians (1206–1261)
- Papal Quarrel with John Lackland (1208)
- Conquest of the Estonian Hinderland (1208–1226)
- Albigensian Crusade (1209–1229) (Cathar Crusade)
- Children's Crusade (1212)
- A Political Crusade in England (1215–1217)
- Fifth Crusade (1217–1221)
- Crusade against Semigallians (1219–1290)
- Crusade against Frederick II (1220–1241)
- Prussian Crusades (1222–1274)
- Crusade of William VI of Montferrat (1225)
- Sixth Crusade (1228–1229) (Crusade of Emperor Frederick II)
- Drenther Crusade (1228–1232)
- Crusade of John of Brienne in Apulia (1229)
- Crusade against the Stedinger (1233–1234) (Stedinger Crusade)
- Bogomils Crusades (1234, 1252)
- Bosnian Crusade (1235–1241)
- Barons' Crusade (1239–1241) (Crusade of 1239)
- Crusade of Theobald I of Navarre (1239–1240)
- Crusade to Tzurulum (1239)
- Crusade of Richard of Cornwall (1240–1241)
- Genoese Crusade against Savona and Albenga (1240)
- Crusade against the Mongols (1241)
- Crusade against Curonians (1242–1267)
- Seventh Crusade (1248–1254) (Crusade of Louis IX of France to the East)
- Pope Innocent IV's Crusade against Frederick II (1248)
- Crusade against Sicily (1248)
- Crusade against Conrad IV (1250)
- First Shepherds' Crusade (1251)
- Crusade against Manfred of Sicily (1255–1266)
- Crusade against Ezzelino III da Romano (1256)
- Crusade Preached against the Mongols in Syria (1260)
- Anti-Byzantine Crusades (1261–1320)
- Another Political Crusade in England (1263–1265)
- Crusade of Odo of Burgundy (1265–1266)
- Crusade of Charles of Anjou against Lucera (1268)
- Crusade against Conradin, nominal king of Jerusalem (1268)
- Crusade of James I of Aragon (1269–1270)
- Eighth Crusade (1270) (Crusade of Louis IX of France to Tunis)
- Lord Edward's Crusade (1271–1272) (Crusade of Lord Edward of England, the Ninth Crusade, or the Last Crusade)
- Plans for a Joint Latin-Greek Crusade (1274–1276)
- Crusade of Henry of Mecklenburg (1275)
- Lithuanian Crusades (1284–1435)
- Crusade against the Aragonese (1284–1285) (Aragonese Crusade, or Crusade of Aragon)
- Siege of Acre (1291)
- Crusade against Frederick III of Sicily (1298, 1299, 1302).
- Crusade against the Colonna Cardinals (1298)

Fourteenth century

- Expedition of the Almogavars (1301–1311)
- Hospitaller Crusade (1306–1310) (Hospitaller conquest of Rhodes)
- Crusade of the Poor (1309) (Crusade of 1309 or the Shepards' Crusade of 1309)
- Crusade against the Venetians (1309)
- Crusade of Clement V (1309)
- Crusade against the Aragonese (1309)
- French Plans for Crusade (1317–1333)
- Crusade of Philip V (1317–1322)
- Second Shepherds' Crusade (1320) (The Pastoreaux of 1320)
- Crusade against Frederico I of Montefeltro (1321–1322)
- Crusade against Ferrara, Milan and the Ghibellines (1321–1322) (Anti-Ghibelline Crusades)
- Crusade against the Arogonese (1321–1322)
- Crusade of Charles IV (1322–1328)
- Crusade against the Emperor Louis IV (1328–1329)
- Crusade against the Catalan Grand Company (1330–1332) (Anti-Catalan Crusade)
- Crusade of Philip VI (1330–1332)
- The Naval Crusade of the Holy League (1332–1333)
- The Holy League of Clement VI (1343)
- Smyrniote Crusades (1343–1351)
- Smyrna Crusade (1344)
- Crusade of Humbert II of Viennois (1346)
- Crusade of Magnus Eriksson (1347–1351)
- Crusade against Francesco Ordelaffi (1355–1357)
- Crusade against Bernabò Visconti (1362–1363)
- Crusade of Peter I de Lusignan (1362–1365)
- Crusade of Urban V (1363–1364)
- Alexandrian Crusade (1365)
- Crusade of Amadeus VI of Savoy (Savoyard crusade) (1366–1367)
- The Great Schism and the Crusades (1382–1387).
- Crusade against Charles III of Naples (1382)
- Despenser's Crusade (1383) (Norwich Crusade)
- Crusade of John of Gaunt (1387).
- Mahdia Crusade (1390) (Barbary Crusade or Crusade of Louis II de Bourbon against Mahdia)
- Crusade of Nicopolis (1396)
- Crusade of Marshal Boucicaut to Constantinople (1399)

Fifteenth century

- Crusades against the Hussites (1420–1431)
- First Anti-Hussite Crusade (1420)
- Second Anti-Hussite Crusade (1421–1422)
- Third Anti-Hussite Crusade (1423–1424)
- Fourth Anti-Hussite Crusade (1426–1428)
- Crusade of Joan of Arc (1430)
- Fifth Anti-Hussite Crusade (1431)
- Crusade of Varna (1443–1444)
- Crusades to Recover Constantinople (1453–1460)
- Crusade of Nicholas V (1455–1456)
- Genoese Crusade to defend Chios (1455–1457)
- Crusade of St. John of Capistrano (1456) (Siege of Belgrade)
- Occupation of Sporades (1457)
- Crusade of Pius II (1464)
- Siege of Rhodes (1480)
- The Anti-Turkish Crusade (1480–1481)
- Crusade of Otranto (1481)
- Granada War (1482–1491)
- The Waldensian Crusade in the Dauphine (1487–1491)
- Spanish Crusade in North Africa (1499–1510)

Sixteenth century

- Siege of Rhodes (1522)
- Crusade of the Emperor Charles V to Algiers (1541) (Algiers Expedition)
- Spanish Crusade to Mahdia (1550)
- Crusade of King Sebastian of Portugal to Morocco (1578) (Battle of Alcácer Quibir or the Battle of Three Kings)

Seventeenth century

- The Great Turkish War (1683–1699) (The Fourteenth Crusade)

== See also ==
- Crusader States
- European wars of religion
- List of sources for the Crusades

== Bibliography ==
- Asbridge, Thomas (2004). The First Crusade: A New History. Oxford University Press. ISBN 9780195178234.
- Asbridge, Thomas (2012). The Crusades: The War for the Holy Land. Simon & Schuster. ISBN 9781849836883.
- Fine, John V. A. (1994) [1987]. The Late Medieval Balkans: A Critical Survey from the Late Twelfth Century to the Ottoman Conquest. Ann Arbor, Michigan: University of Michigan Press. ISBN 978-0-472-10079-8.
- Grousset, René (1970). The Epic of the Crusades [L'épopée des croisades]. Translated by Lindsay, Noël. Orion Press. ISBN 9780023297229.
- Hamilton, Bernard (1998). The Crusades. Sutton. ISBN 9780750919142.
- Lock, Peter (2006). The Routledge Companion to the Crusades. Routledge. ISBN 9781135131371.
- Madden, Thomas F. (2013). The Concise History of the Crusades. Critical Issues in World and International History (Third ed.). Rowman & Littlefield. ISBN 978-1-4422-1575-7.
- Michaud, Joseph François (1881). History of the Crusades [Histoire des Croisades]. Translated by Robson, William. Three volumes. London: George Routledge and Sons.
- Murray, Alan V., ed. (2006). The Crusades: An Encyclopedia. ABC-CLIO. ISBN 9781576078624.
- Richard, Jean C. (1999). The Crusades, c.1071–c.1291 [Histoire des croisades]. Translated by Birrell, Jean. Cambridge University Press. ISBN 9780521625661.
- Riley-Smith, Jonathan (1991). The Atlas of the Crusades. Facts on File. ISBN 9780816021864.
- Riley-Smith, Jonathan (1997). The First Crusaders, 1095–1131. Cambridge University Press. ISBN 9780521646031.
- Riley-Smith, Jonathan, ed. (2001). The Oxford Illustrated History of The Crusades. Oxford University Press. ISBN 9780192854285.
- Riley-Smith, Jonathan (2014). The Crusades: A History. Bloomsbury Publishing. ISBN 9781472508799.
- Rousset, Paul (1957). Histoire des croisades. Payot. ISBN 9782228120203.
- Runciman, Steven (1951). A History of the Crusades, Volume One: The First Crusade and the Foundation of the Kingdom of Jerusalem. Cambridge University Press. ISBN 9780521347709.
- Runciman, Steven (1952). A History of the Crusades, Volume Two: The Kingdom of Jerusalem and the Frankish East, 1100–1187. Cambridge University Press. ISBN 9780521347716.
- Runciman, Steven (1954). A History of the Crusades, Volume Three: The Kingdom of Acre and the Later Crusades. Cambridge University Press. ISBN 9780521347723.
- Setton, Kenneth M., ed. (1969–1989). A History of the Crusades. Six Volumes. University of Wisconsin Press.
- Tyerman, Christopher (2006). God's War: A New History of the Crusades. Belknap Press. ISBN 9780674023871.
- Tyerman, Christopher (2009). The Crusades. Sterling Publishing Company. ISBN 9781402768910.
- Venning, Timothy; Frankopan, Peter (2015). A Chronology of the Crusades. Taylor & Francis. ISBN 9781317496434.
