= Battle of Pallene =

1344 battle of the Smyrniote crusades

- Part of the Smyrniote crusades
Date	13 May 1344
Location	Pallene peninsula, Chalcidice
Result	Christian victory

Belligerents
Republic of Venice (Sovereign Military Order of Malta) Knights Hospitaller; Kingdom of Cyprus; Papal States	Turks

Strength
24 ships	52 or 60 ships

The Battle of Pallene occurred in 1344 between the fleets of a Latin Christian league and Turkish raiders, at the Pallene Peninsula in northern Greece.

== Battle ==
The battle is known through the chronicle of the Paduan jurist Guglielmo Cortusi, and the history of the Byzantine emperor John VI Kantakouzenos (r. 1347–1354). Cortusi supplies the date, Ascension Day (13 May 1344), and records that the Christians destroyed 52 Turkish vessels. According to Kantakouzenos, the Christian fleet numbered 24 galleys, and it forced the Turks to abandon their ships, 60 in number, at an inlet called Longos on the Pallene Peninsula. The Christians then proceeded to burn the abandoned Turkish vessels.

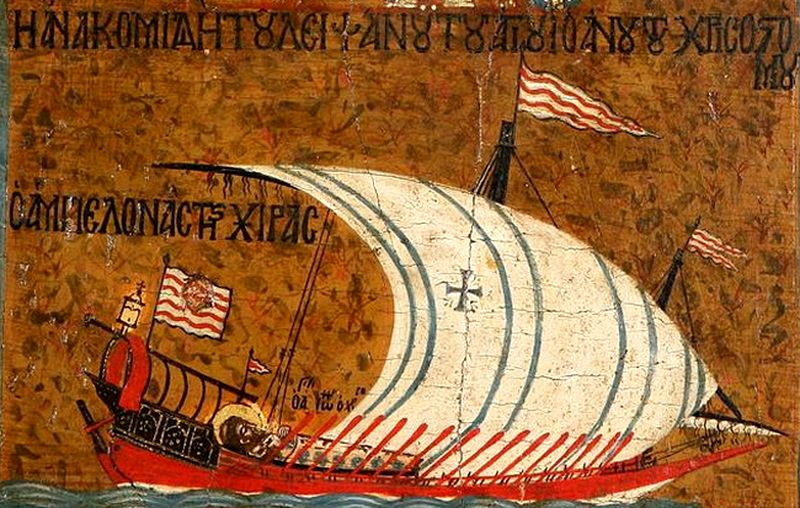
14th-century painting of a light galley, from an icon now at the Byzantine and Christian Museum at Athens

The identity of the Christian fleet is not revealed by the sources, but since on 25 July, Pope Clement VI congratulated the Grand Master of the Knights Hospitaller, Helion de Villeneuve, for his contributions to the crusade organized by the papal legate Henry of Asti, the fleet was probably the same as that organized for the Smyrniote crusade, comprising four vessels each from the Pope and the King of Cyprus, six Hospitaller vessels, and the remainder probably made up by Venetian ships, which had assembled at Negroponte in November 1343.

== Aftermath ==
The Crusader fleet then went on to capture the port and lower city of Smyrna on 28 October, but the citadel remained in the hands of the Aydinid Turks. The Aydinid ruler, Umur Bey, in turn besieged the Crusaders, and in a surprise attack on 17 January managed to kill the Crusader leaders. Nevertheless, albeit with great difficulty and being constantly harassed by the Turks, Smyrna remained in Latin hands until it was captured by Tamerlane in 1402.

== See also ==
- Battle of Adramyttion (1334)
- Battle of Imbros (1347)
- Battle of Megara (1359)

== Sources ==
- Lock, Peter (2013). The Routledge Companion to the Crusades. Routledge. ISBN 9781135131371.
- Luttrell, Anthony (1975). "The Hospitallers at Rhodes, 1306–1421". In Setton, Kenneth M.; Hazard, Harry W. (eds.). A History of the Crusades, Volume III: The Fourteenth and Fifteenth Centuries. Vol. 3. Madison and London: University of Wisconsin Press. pp. 278–313. ISBN 0-299-06670-3.
- Setton, Kenneth M. (1976). The Papacy and the Levant (1204–1571), Volume I: The Thirteenth and Fourteenth Centuries. Vol. 1. Philadelphia: The American Philosophical Society. ISBN 0-87169-114-0.
