= Battle of Imbros (1347) =

Naval battle as part of Smyrniote crusades

- Part of the Smyrniote crusades
| Date | late April 1347 |
| Location | Imbros |
| Result | Crusader victory |

Belligerents
| Republic of Venice (Sovereign Military Order of Malta) Knights Hospitaller other Latins | Beylik of Sarukhan; Beylik of Aydin |

Strength
| | 118 galleys |

The Battle of Imbros occurred in spring 1347 between the fleets of a Christian naval league formed as part of the Smyrniote crusades, and of a Turkish raiding fleet, possibly from the beyliks of Aydin and Sarukhan. The Turks abandoned their ships and landed on the island of Imbros, where most were captured.

== Opposing forces ==
The battle is mentioned in two letters sent in June 1347 by Pope Clement VI. The size and composition of the Christian fleet is unknown. The 1343 agreement for the naval league stipulated a force of twenty galleys: six each from Venice and the Knights Hospitaller, and four each from the Papal States and the Kingdom of Cyprus. However, according to the archives of the Venetian Senate, for the first half of 1347, Venice armed only five galleys for participation in the league.

The Turks reportedly had 118 vessels, apparently considerably outnumbering the Crusader fleet. However, modern historians think it is likely that most of the Turkish vessels were relatively light craft, such as commandeered fishing boats or light transport ships, compared to the war galleys of the Crusaders, as the Turks were geared towards raiding. The Turks are usually mentioned as belonging to the two beyliks of Aydin and Sarukhan, but Kenneth Setton doubts the presence of the Aydinids in this battle, and that the Turks were simply led by "some Turkish emir or captain".

== Battle ==
Around the end of April, the Crusader fleet met the Turks off the island of Imbros in the northeastern Aegean. Taken by surprise, the Turks abandoned their ships and landed on the island, but they were surrounded by the Crusaders, who sent for reinforcements to the Hospitallers headquarters on Rhodes. The Hospitallers sent two galleys and one lighter vessel, as well as troops and cavalry, which proved crucial in the ensuing land engagement, in which most of the Turks were captured and enslaved.

== See also ==
- Battle of Pallene

== Sources ==
- Carr, Mike (2013). "The Hospitallers of Rhodes and their Alliances against the Turks". In Buttigieg, Emanuel; Phillips, Simon (eds.). Islands and Military Orders, c.1291–c.1798. Farnham: Ashgate. pp. 167–176. ISBN 978-1-472-40990-4.
- Carr, Mike (2015). Merchant Crusaders in the Aegean, 1291–1352. Boydell & Brewer. ISBN 978-1-843839903.
- Luttrell, Anthony (1975). "The Hospitallers at Rhodes, 1306–1421". In Setton, Kenneth M.; Hazard, Harry W. (eds.). A History of the Crusades, Volume III: The Fourteenth and Fifteenth Centuries. Vol. 3. Madison and London: University of Wisconsin Press. pp. 278–313. ISBN 0-299-06670-3.
- Setton, Kenneth M. (1976). The Papacy and the Levant (1204–1571), Volume I: The Thirteenth and Fourteenth Centuries. Vol. 1. Philadelphia: The American Philosophical Society. ISBN 0-87169-114-0.
