= Battle of Adramyttion (1334) =

Part of the Crusades

- Part of the Crusades
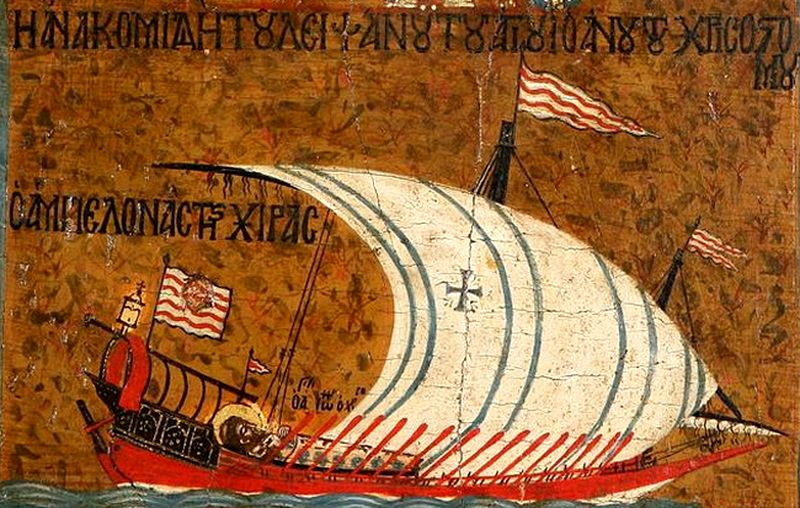
- 14th-century painting of a light galley, from an icon now at the Byzantine and Christian Museum at Athens
Date	Autumn 1334
Location	Gulf of Adramyttion (modern-day Turkey)
Result	Naval League victory

Belligerents
Christian Naval League: Republic of Venice (Sovereign Military Order of Malta) Knights Hospitaller; Kingdom of Cyprus; Papal States; Kingdom of France	Beylik of Karasi

Commanders and leaders
Pietro Zeno	Yakhshi

Strength
34 galleys	

Casualties and losses
	150–200 ships destroyed, 5,000 soldiers killed

The Battle of Adramyttion occurred in autumn 1334 between the fleets of a Christian naval league, headed by the Republic of Venice and the Knights Hospitaller, and of the Turkish beylik of Karasi. The battle was a Christian victory.

== Background ==
The Naval League participants agreed to assemble a fleet of 40 galleys, of which 10 vessels each were contributed by Venice and the Hospitallers, six each by the Byzantines and Cyprus, and another eight jointly by the Pope and the King of France. The fleet would gather at the Venetian stronghold of Negroponte, and operate for a period of five months. In the event, the Byzantines did not send any ships, so the League fleet that sailed in 1334 comprised 34 galleys. The Venetian fleet began operations in winter 1333/1334, fighting the combined fleets of the Turkish beys Umur of Aydin and Suleyman of Sarukhan off the Morea, as well as the forces of a Slav pirate, Zassis.

== Battle ==
The Franco-Papal squadron joined up with the other squadrons in summer 1334, and the joint fleet proceeded to raid the western coasts of Asia Minor, belonging to the beyliks of Aydin, Karasi, and Sarukhan. In autumn, the League fleet was confronted by the fleet of the Karasid bey Yakhshi. In a series of engagements, the Crusaders inflicted a major defeat on the Karasids. The details and exact chronology are disputed—according to a badly damaged letter by Marino Sanudo Torsello, fights took place on 8, 11, 14, and 17 September, when Yakhshi's son-in-law was killed—but according to Western reports, 150–200 ships were destroyed and 5,000 Turks were killed.

== Aftermath ==
The Christian fleet proceeded to raid the coasts of Asia Minor, and launched an attack on Smyrna, the main naval base of the Aydinid beylik. In the event, the success of Christian victory at Adramyttion was short-lived; once the allied fleet departed from the Aegean, the Turkish raids resumed. King Hugh IV of Cyprus scored two further victories, about which no details are known, in 1336–37, but plans for a landing in Asia Minor in 1336 in preparation for a full Crusade had to be shelved due to the renewed conflict between England and France, since King Philip VI of France diverted the crusading fleet to the English Channel. It was not until 1342 that a new league was formed, and the Smyrniote Crusade launched.

== See also ==
- Battle of Chios (1319)

== Sources ==
- Carr, Mike (2013). "The Hospitallers of Rhodes and their Alliances against the Turks". In Buttigieg, Emanuel; Phillips, Simon (eds.). Islands and Military Orders, c. 1291–c. 1798. Farnham: Ashgate. pp. 167–176. ISBN 978-1-472-40990-4.
- Carr, Mike (2015). Merchant Crusaders in the Aegean, 1291–1352. Boydell & Brewer. ISBN 978-1-843839903.
- Chrissis, Nikolaos G. (2014). "Crusades and Crusaders in Medieval Greece". In Tsougarakis, Nickiphoros I.; Lock, Peter (eds.). A Companion to Latin Greece. Brill's Companions to European History. Leiden and New York: Brill. pp. 23–72. ISBN 978-90-0-4284104.
