= Hafsa Hatun =

Consort of Sultan Bayezid I

- Born: Selçuk, Aydinid beylik
- Died: after 1403; Bursa, Ottoman Empire
- Spouse: Bayezid I (m. 1390; death 1403)
- House: Aydinid (by birth); Ottoman (by marriage)
- Father: Fahreddin Isa Bey
- Religion: Sunni Islam

Hafsa Hatun (Ottoman Turkish: حفصه خاتون, 'young lioness', died after 1403) was a Turkish princess, and a consort of Bayezid I, Sultan of the Ottoman Empire.

== Life ==
Hafsa Hatun was the daughter of Isa Bey, the ruler of the Aydinids. She was married to Bayezid in 1390, upon his conquest of the Aydinids. She had no known children. Her father had surrendered without a fight, and a marriage was arranged between her and Bayezid. Thereafter, Isa was sent into exile in Iznik, shorn of his power, where he subsequently died. Her marriage strengthened the bonds between the two families.

== Charities ==
Hafsa Hatun's public works are located within her father's territory and may have been built before she married Bayezid. She commissioned a fountain in Tire city and a hermitage in Bademiye, and a mosque known as Hafsa Hatun Mosque between 1390 and 1392 from the money she received in her dowry.

== See also ==
- Ottoman dynasty
- Ottoman Empire
