= İsa Bey Mosque =

Mosque in Selçuk, Turkey

Coordinates: 37°57′08″N 27°21′57″E

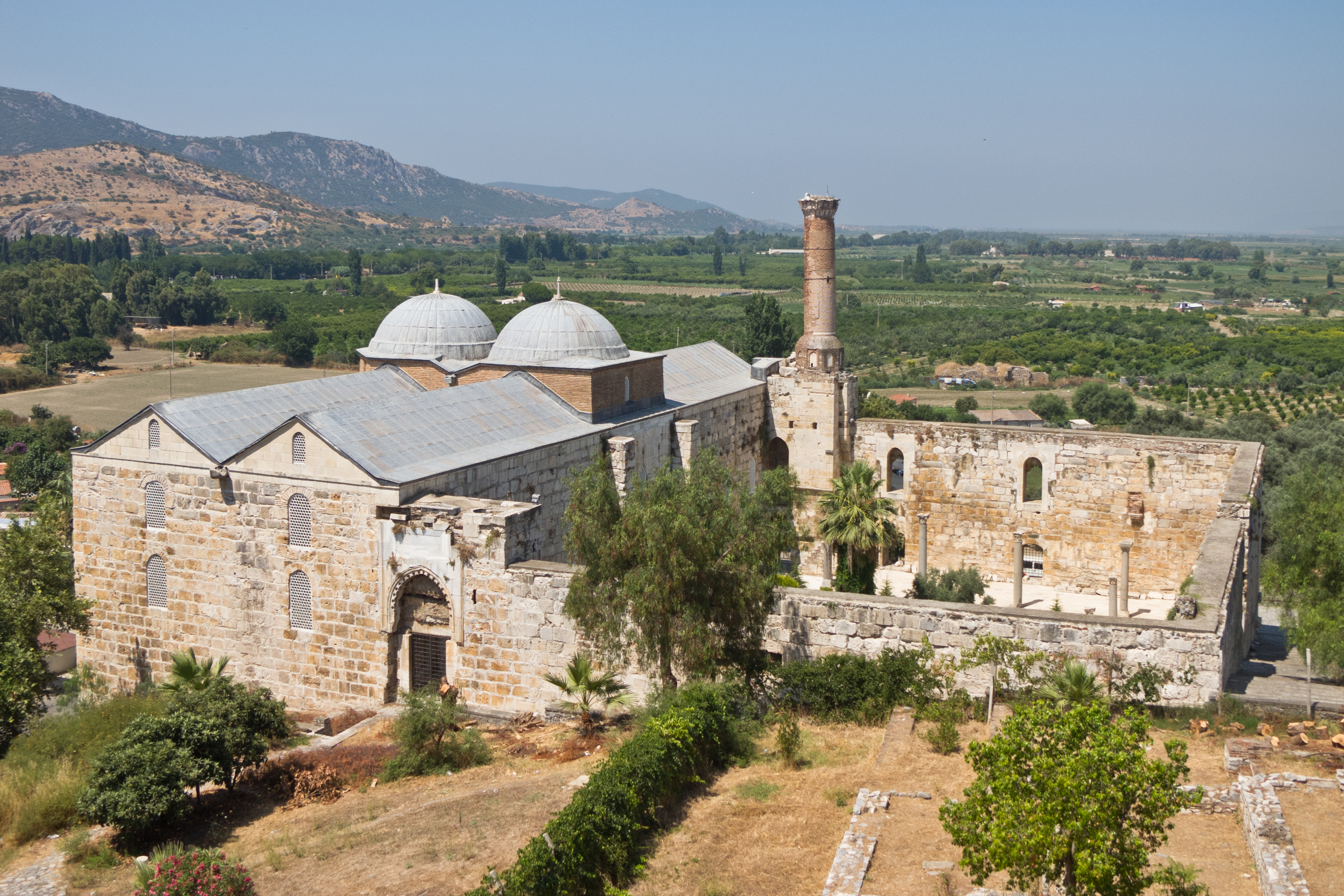

Religion
- Affiliation: Islam
- District: Selçuk
- Province: İzmir
- Region: Aegean Region

Location
- Location: Selçuk, Turkey
- Interactive map of İsa Bey Mosque

Architecture
- Architect: Şamlı Dımışklıoğlu Ali
- Type: Mosque
- Style: Islamic, Seljuk
- Completed: 1374–75

Specifications
- Length: 56 metres (184 ft)
- Width: 48 metres (157 ft)
- Dome: 2
- Dome dia. (outer): 9.4 metres (31 ft) and 8.4 metres (28 ft)
- Minaret: 1
- Materials: cut stone, marble, brick

The İsa Bey Mosque (Turkish: İsa Bey Camii), constructed in 1374–75, is one of the oldest and most impressive works of architectural art remaining from the Anatolian beyliks. The mosque is situated on the outskirts of the Ayasluğ Hills at Selçuk, İzmir.

== History ==
It was built by the Syrian architect, 'Ali b. Mushaimish al-Dimashqi, in honor of the Aydinid Isa Bey. The plans for the mosque are based on the Great Mosque of Damascus.

By 1829, the mosque was in ruins and by 1842 the minaret had fallen down. In the 19th century, it was also used as a caravanserai. There is an octagonal Seljuk türbe made of stone and bricks, with a pyramid shaped roof, right next to the mosque.

== Architecture ==
The mosque has two main entrances, to the east and to the west and contains a fountain court. The western wall has inscriptions and geometric shapes engraved. These walls are covered with marble, whereas the façades on the remaining sides are made of cut stone. It is built asymmetrically on a 48-by-56-metre (157 by 184 ft) base. The rims of its domes, with diameters of 9.4 metres (31 ft) and 8.1 metres (27 ft), are decorated with İznik (Nicaea) tiles. Twelve round columns stand inside its courtyard encircled with porches. Its brick minaret is built on an octagonal base, and the upper part from the balcony is ruined. The mosque had another minaret on the west, which is totally destroyed now. The mihrab (niche or altar) was moved to another mosque, due to a door opened there.

== Gallery ==
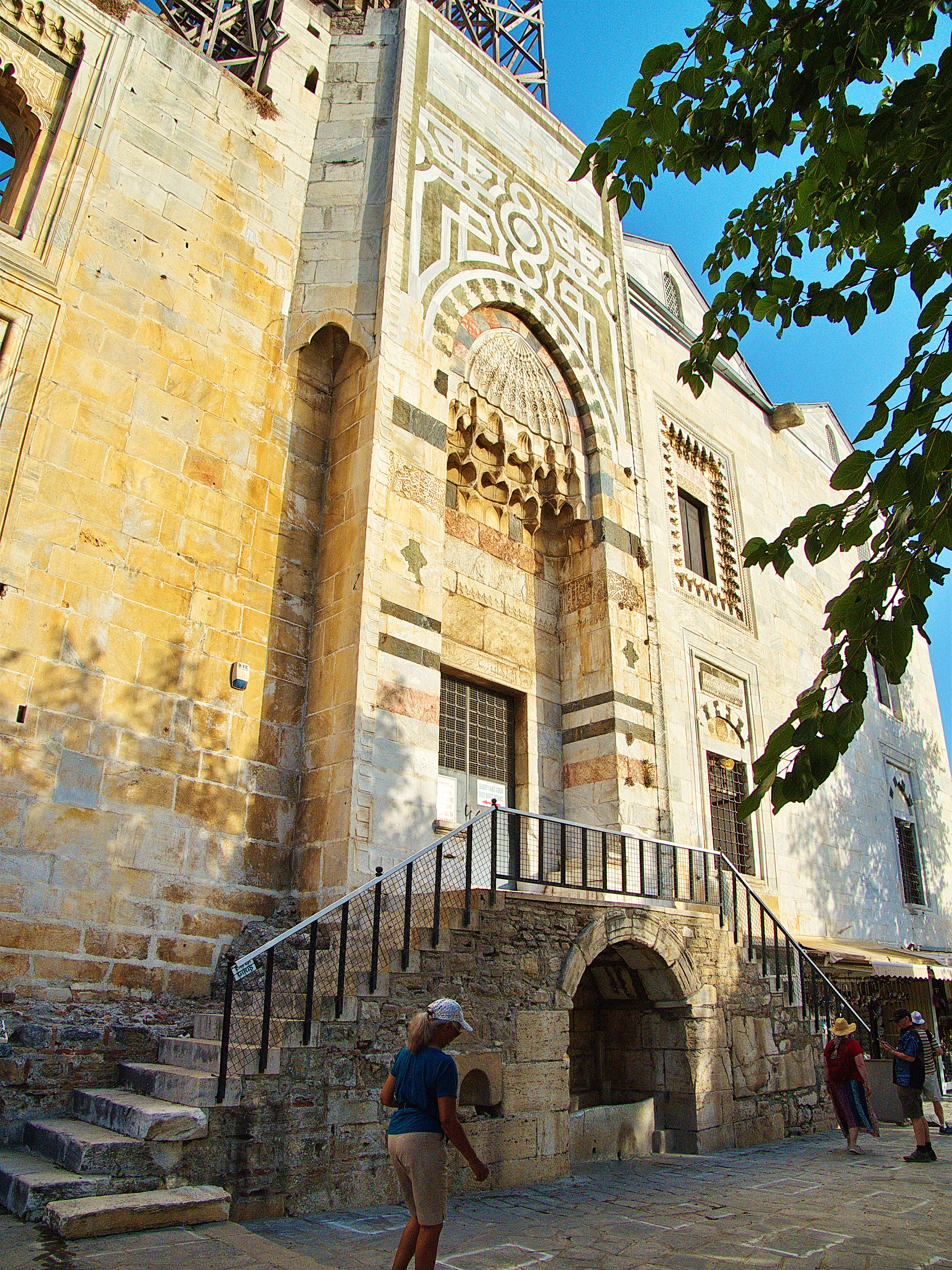
Isa Bey Mosque Exterior view

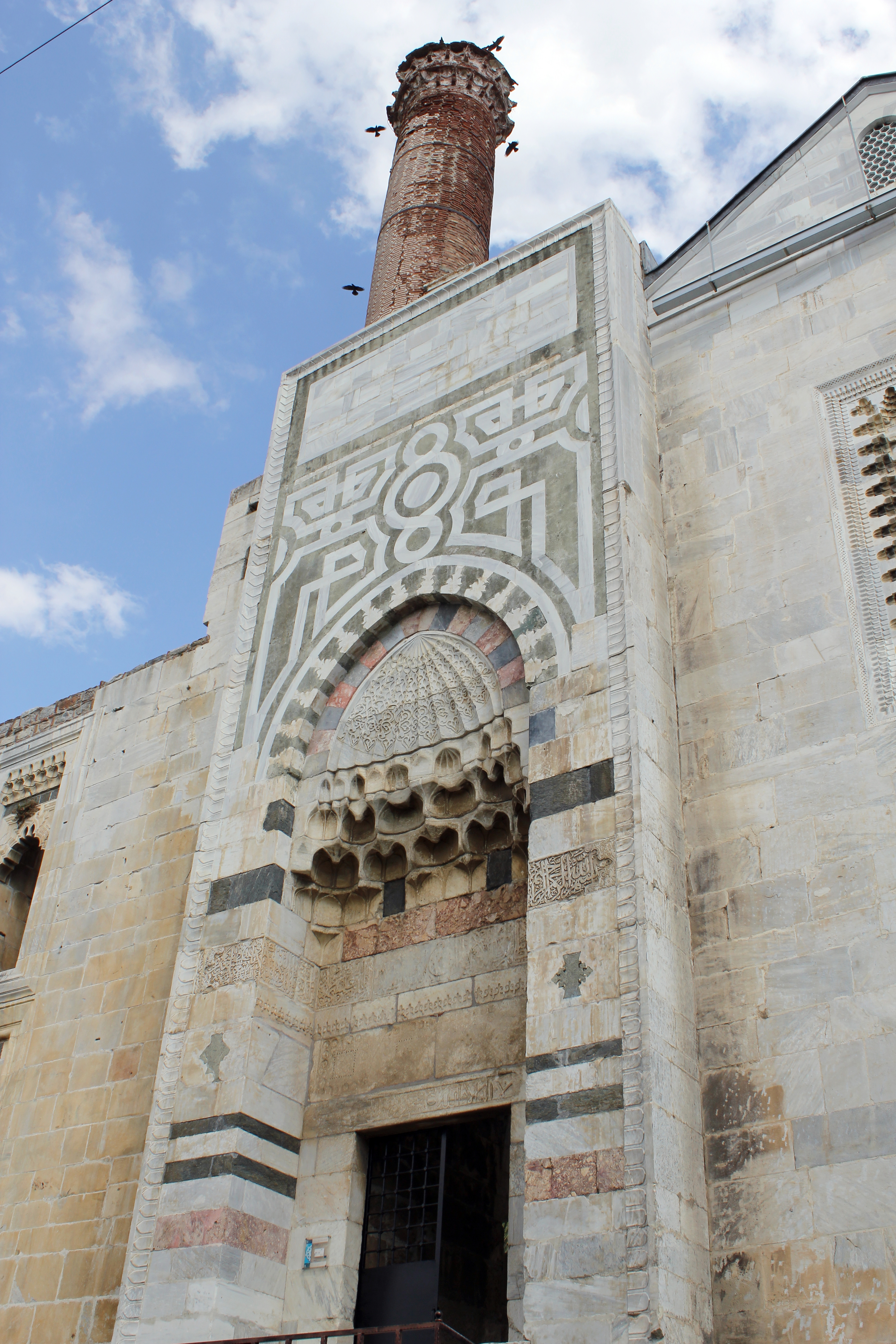
Entrance of the courtyard

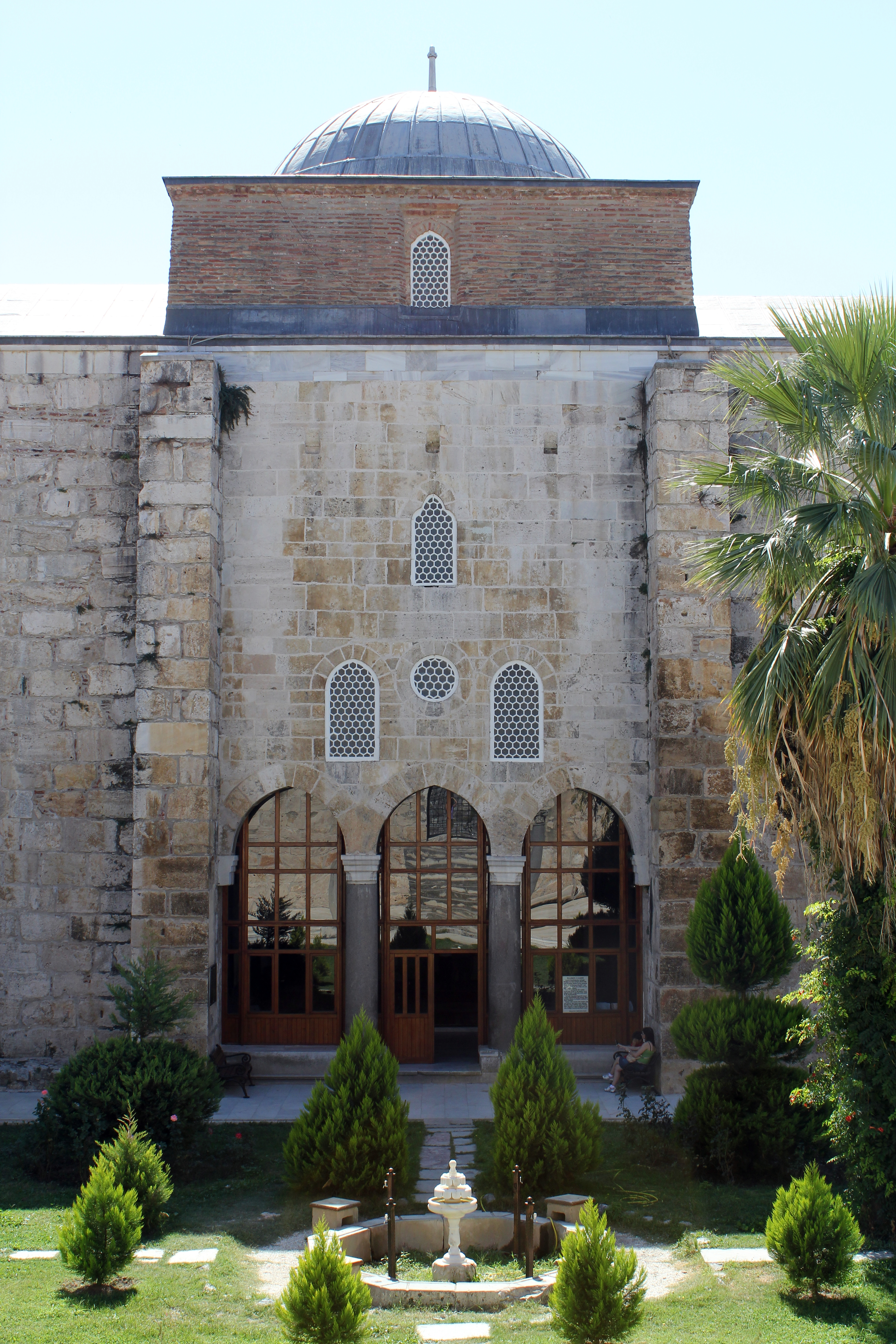
Entrance of the mosque

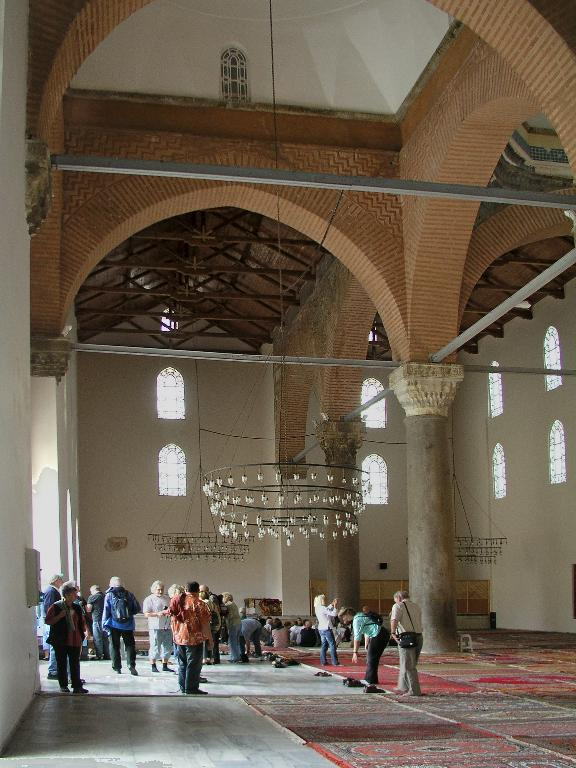
Interior of the mosque

Plan

== See also ==
- Aydinid dynasty
- Anatolian beyliks
- Islamic architecture
- Islamic art
- List of mosques
- Timeline of Islamic history
- List of Turkish Grand Mosques
