= Pietro Zeno (died 1345) =

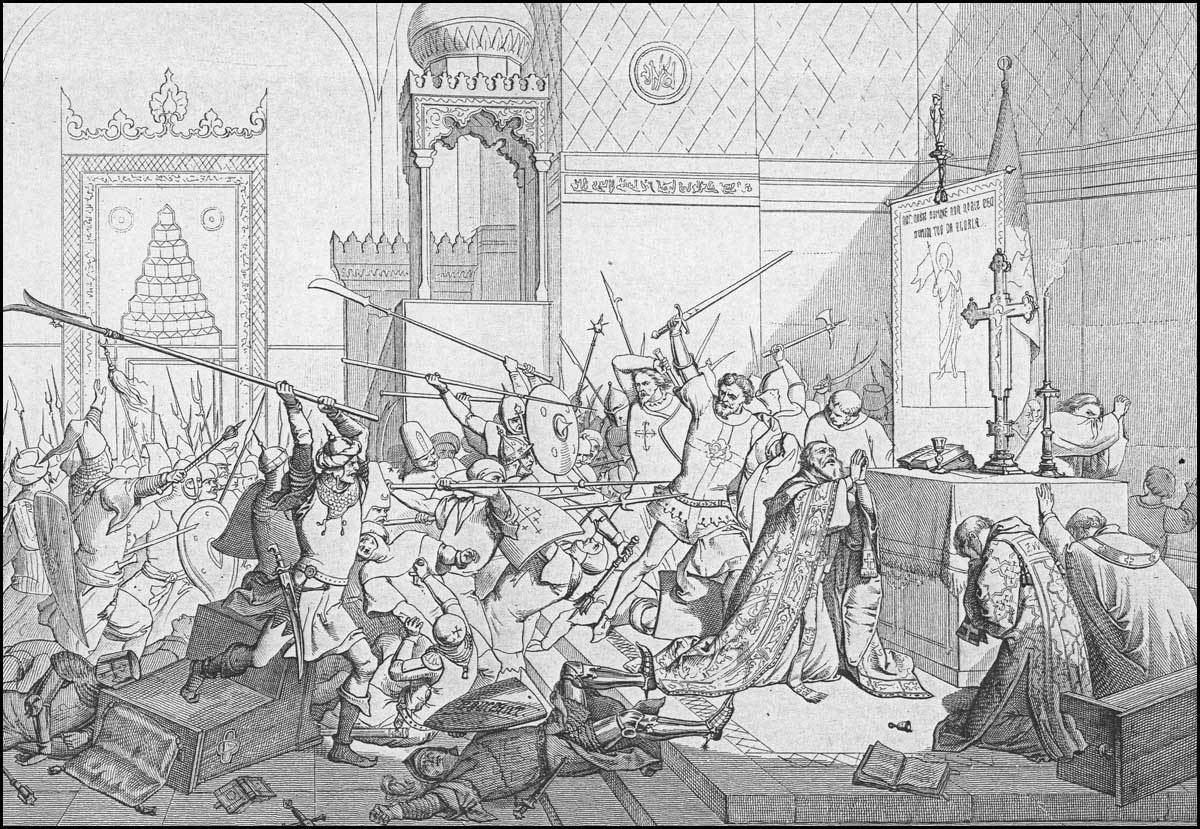
Phantastical depiction of Zeno's death by Giuseppe Gatteri

Pietro Zeno (Note: This is an italianised form of the Venetian name Piero Zen.) (died 17 January 1345) was the Venetian captain and bailiff of Negroponte (1331–33) (Note: He was the second bailiff of that name. The first Pietro Zeno was bailiff in 1276–77 or 1277–78.) and one of the leaders of the Smyrniote crusade (1343–45).

In May–June 1332, an Aydinid Turkish fleet of 380 ships under Umur Bey attacked Negroponte. Zeno bought them off with a large tribute. On 18 July 1332, Doge Francesco Dandolo charged Zeno and Pietro da Canale with arranging an anti-Turkish alliance. By the end of the year the Naval League, "a union, society and league for the discomfiture of the Turks and the defence of the true faith", had been formally constituted. In 1334 Zeno took command of the league's fleet of twenty galleys and on 14 September defeated the large fleet of Yakhshi, emir of Karasi, off Adramyttion.

In September 1343, the Venetian Grand Council elected Zeno captain of the flotilla of five galleys which it was sending to assist the crusade against Aydinid-held Smyrna. Although the crusade was a great naval success and Smyrna was taken, Zeno was killed by Umur Bey's forces in an ambush while he and the other crusader leaders, including Henry of Asti, were attempting to celebrate a mass in a church in the no-man's-land between the battle lines.

Zeno's son, also Pietro Zeno, was a famous diplomat in the eastern Mediterranean.

== Sources ==
- Bury, John B. (1887). "The Lombards and Venetians in Euboia (1303–1340)". The Journal of Hellenic Studies. 8: 194–213. doi:10.2307/623457. JSTOR 623457. S2CID 163172908.
- Hopf, Charles (1873). Chroniques gréco-romanes inédites ou peu connues. Berlin: Weidmann.
- Miller, William (1908). The Latins in the Levant: A History of Frankish Greece (1204–1566). London: John Murray. OCLC 563022439.
- Morgan, Gareth (1976). "The Venetian Claims Commission of 1278". Byzantinische Zeitschrift. 69 (2): 411–38. doi:10.1515/byzs.1976.69.2.411. S2CID 159571822.
- Nicol, Donald M. (1988). Byzantium and Venice: A Study in Diplomatic and Cultural Relations. Cambridge: Cambridge University Press. ISBN 0-521-34157-4.
- Setton, Kenneth M. (1976). The Papacy and the Levant (1204–1571), Volume I: The Thirteenth and Fourteenth Centuries. Philadelphia: The American Philosophical Society. ISBN 0-87169-114-0.
