= Holy League (1332) =

Part of the Crusades

- 1332–1337
- Status: Military alliance
- Establishment: 6 September 1332
- History
  - Established: 1332
  - Dissolved: 1337
Succeeded by
Smyrniote crusades

The Holy League (Latin: Sancta Unio) was a military alliance of the chief Christian states of the Aegean Sea and the Eastern Mediterranean against the mounting threat of naval raids by the Turkish beyliks of Anatolia. The alliance was spearheaded by the main regional naval power, the Republic of Venice, and included the Knights Hospitaller, the Kingdom of Cyprus, and the Byzantine Empire, while other states also promised support.

== Formation of the league ==
At the beginning of the fourteenth century, the frequent Turkish raids in the Aegean Sea alerted Latin rulers in the region, especially the Republic of Venice which depended heavily on oversea commerce. The idea of a naval league originated in the fact that at the time, no local Latin rulers were strong enough to dominate the Aegean sea alone and face common enemies such as the Turks. Therefore, many bilateral, often temporary treaties existed, such as a treaty made between the Genoese and Hospitallers before 1319 in which both sides agreed to equip together on a fleet which in summer 1319 was able to crush a fleet of the Aydinids. Reports of this victory were widely disseminated in the West, reaching the attention of Pope John XXII and crusade theorists who considered the creation of a naval league to be able to both enforce an economic blockade as well as check Turkish advances in the Aegean.

At the same time, pressure exerted by the Catalan Company in Greece led the Republic of Venice to ban, under heavy penalties, all Venetian merchants to trade with the Turks as this was seen as strengthening the enemy. Also, the Republic dispatched emissaries to the Byzantine emperor Andronikos II, Martino Zaccaria, the Lord of Chios, and Hélion de Villeneuve, Grand Master of the Hospitallers to inquire about the possibility of forming a societas for the protection of their lands against the Turks. On 6 September 1332, representatives of Venice, Byzantium and the Hospitallers entered into an alliance for five years and agreed to assemble a fleet of 20 fully equipped galleys in the harbour of Negropont by 15 April 1333. However, the agreed date passed without the assembled fleet as Venetian attention was diverted by a revolt on Crete. Nevertheless, later that year Pope John XXII as well as the kings of France and Cyprus agreed to lend their support and in early 1334, the participants agreed on a total number of forty galleys. In March, four galleys, consisting of 176 and 180 oars, were constructed in Marseille on behalf of the Pope who appointed the French knight John of Cepoy as Captain of the Franco-papal fleet.

== Operations in 1334 ==
In summer 1334, the Franco-Papal fleet joined with the ships of the Venetians, Hospitallers and Cypriots, bringing the fleet to full strength with exception of the Byzantine galleys. Together, they attacked the beyliks of Aydin, Karasi and Sarukhan. In September 1334, the forces achieved a notable success in the Battle of Adramyttion in which they defeated a fleet belonging to Yakhshi, the Karasid bey in several encounters.

The league achieved comparably a great deal in a short time, achieving a level of security in the Aegean not yet experienced in the fourteenth century. With the slowly escalating conflict between England and France, the plans for the reassembly of the league had to be scrapped as papal attention as well as the French galley were diverted from the Aegean Sea. Though some of the participants of the league joined their fleets and even achieved some victories against the Turks, it was not until the papacy of Clement VI who created a new league in 1343.

== Sources ==
- Carr, Mike (2015). Merchant Crusaders in the Aegean, 1291–1352. Boydell & Brewer. ISBN 978-1-84383-990-3.
- Ivanov, Vladislav (2012). "Sancta Unio or the Holy League 1332–36/37 as a Political Factor in the Eastern Mediterranean and the Aegean". Études Balkaniques. 48: 142–176.
- Setton, Kenneth Meyer (1976). The Papacy and the Levant, 1204–1571: The thirteenth and fourteenth centuries. American Philosophical Society. ISBN 978-0-87169-114-9.
- Theotokes, Spyridon (1930). "Η πρώτη συμμαχία των κυρίαρχων κρατών του Αιγαίου κατά της καθόδου των Τούρκων αρχομένου του ΙΔ' αιώνος" [The First Alliance of the Sovereign States of the Aegean Against the Expansion of the Turks at the Beginning of the 14th Century]. Επετηρίς Εταιρείας Βυζαντινών Σπουδών (in Greek). 7: 283–298. hdl:11615/19956.
