= Henry of Asti =

Roman Catholic archbishop

Henry of Asti (Enrico d'Asti, also seen as Enrico Comentina; died 17 January 1345) was the titular Latin Catholic patriarch of Constantinople from 1339 and bishop of Negroponte in Frankish Greece. His fame rests on his leadership of the first Smyrniote crusade (1342–45), on which he died.

In February 1341, Pope Benedict XII ordered him to receive some procurators representing the Catalan Grand Company, which wished to return to "the bosom of the mother Church".

In 1342, Henry negotiated an alliance between King Hugh IV of Cyprus and the Knights Hospitaler against the Turkish ruler Umur Beg of Aydin. On 2 November 1342, he delivered a papal letter to the doge of Venice, Bartolomeo Gradenigo, asking him to join the league and appointing Cardinal Guillaume Court apostolic legate to Venice. On 31 August, Pope Clement VI officially named Henry his legate for the upcoming crusade against Smyrna, "because of the great and important business [he conducted] in Greece". He was to travel, as commander-in-chief, with the Genoese fleet under Martino Zaccaria, who was named captain-general, but whom Henry had authority to remove if need be. In the summer of 1343, the Duke John I of the Archipelago informed Henry in a letter that he wished to supply a galley to the expedition.

On 21 October 1343, Henry was charged with keeping the peace in the Duchy of Athens between the ducal claimant Count Walter VI of Brienne and the occupying forces of the Catalan Company, with whom he had previous experience from 1341. As the crusade dragged on into 1344, Henry wrote to the pope describing its "fortunate progress" and the pope responded, in a letter dated 25 July, by thanking the Hospitaler grand master, Hélion de Villeneuve, for the assistance he was giving the crusade. On 18 September the pope ordered Henry to prevent Zaccaria from re-conquering the Lordship of Chios, which his family had lost to the Byzantines after an internal rebellion. The loss of Chios, the pope thought, would force the Byzantines into an alliance with the Ottomans. After the capture of the harbour of Smyrna on 28 October 1344, Henry established his headquarters there and began restoring the fortifications. Belatedly, on 1 February, Pope Clement congratulated Henry on the victory and on his "virtuously, constantly and intrepidly" leading. He warned about the difficulty of raising funds for the continuance of the crusade, but left the decision on how to proceed to Henry, since the latter, he said, had been taught "in the school of experience". One of the last actions of the patriarch before his death was to lead, with Zaccaria, a fleet of twelve galleys on a successful foray to capture supplies. On their return the Ottomans who had been besieging the citadel retreated.

Henry was killed on 17 January 1345. He had intended to celebrate a victory Mass in a former church (perhaps the seat of the metropolis) that the Turks had used as a stable, and which at the time lay between the Christian and Turkish lines. Although Zaccaria objected to the dangerous venture, he was with Henry at the Mass when the Turks under Umur himself attacked the church. While most of those present got to the safety of the harbour citadel, Henry, Zaccaria and the Venetian leader, Pietro Zeno, were killed. Many legends surrounding this event were later current in Italy.

When Umur Beg's brother and successor, Khidr Beg, signed a peace treaty with the crusaders on 18 August 1348, he offered to return the body of Henry of Asti whenever they claimed it.

== Sources ==
- Setton, Kenneth M. (1976). The Papacy and the Levant (1204–1571), Volume I: The Thirteenth and Fourteenth Centuries. Philadelphia: The American Philosophical Society. ISBN 0-87169-114-0.

Catholic Church titles
Preceded by Rolando d'Asti	— TITULAR — Latin Patriarch of Constantinople; 1339–1345	Succeeded by Stephen of Pinu
