= Isa of Aydin =

Bey of Aydin from 1360 to 1390

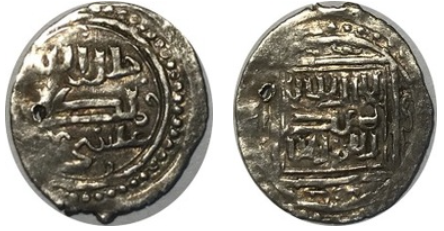

Isa Bey ruled the Aydınid principality from 1360 to 1390, succeeding his brother Khidr. He was the fifth and youngest son of Mehmed Bey (r. 1308–1334). During his reign, the town of Ayasuluk was relatively prosperous economy wise, and held good mercantile relations with the towns of Venice, Ragusa (modern-day Dubrovnik), and Genoa.

His reign ended in 1390 when Ottoman ruler Bayezid I annexed the principality together with other Turkmen principalities that were located in western Rum. Bayezid shortly after married Isa Bey's daughter Hafsa Khatun.

Isa Bey held interests in scholarship and learning, and was able to read Arabic, Persian and Old Anatolian Turkish. His undated tomb is located in Birgi. The precise date of his death remains unknown.

== Sources ==
- Jackson, Cailah (2022). "The Arts of the Book in the Aydınid Realm: Exploring a Neglected Medical Manuscript from Late Fourteenth-Century Western Rum". Muqarnas Online. 39 (1): 61–77. doi:10.1163/22118993-00391P05.
