= William Robson (writer) =

English educator and writer (1785/6–1863)

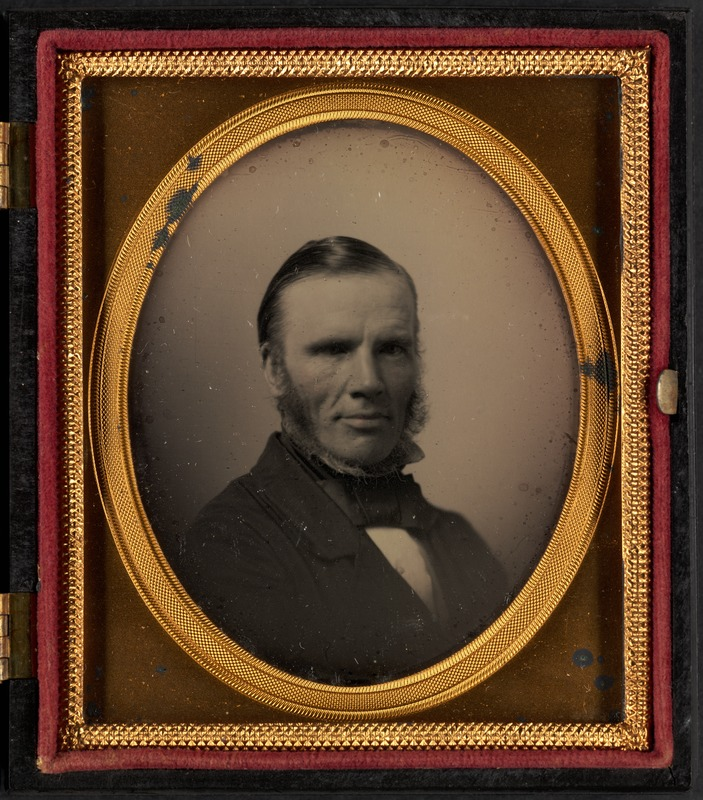
William Robson, ca. 1858. Print Department Collection, Boston Public Library

William Robson (1785/6–1863) was a British author and translator.

== Life ==
Robson was educated in Chertsey, at a school run by John Harris Wicks. He went into teaching himself.

Around 1813, he formed a close friendship with the publisher John Taylor. Through Taylor he was on the fringes of the group producing The London Magazine of 1820 to 1829, with James Augustus Hessey, Charles Lamb and John Hamilton Reynolds.

Robson's first career was as a schoolmaster. He was headmaster of Chingford Lodge Academy in Edmonton, London, from 1835, but suffered financial losses.

At that point past age 50, Robson then concentrated on writing. In later life, he fell into poverty. He died on 17 November 1863: George Routledge the publisher had raised a public subscription for him, but he had not yet had the benefit of it.

== Works ==
Robson wrote:

- The Walk, or the Pleasures of Literary Associations, 1837
- The Old Playgoer, 1846, London, letters describing the British stage at the beginning of 19th century
- John Railton, or Read and Think, 1854
- The Life of Cardinal Richelieu, 1854
- The Great Sieges of History

Robson also translated French works, including: Joseph François Michaud's History of the Crusades, 1852; Alexandre Dumas's Three Musketeers, 1853; and Balzac's Balthazar, 1859.
