= Smyrniote crusades =

14th-century crusades

- Part of the Crusades
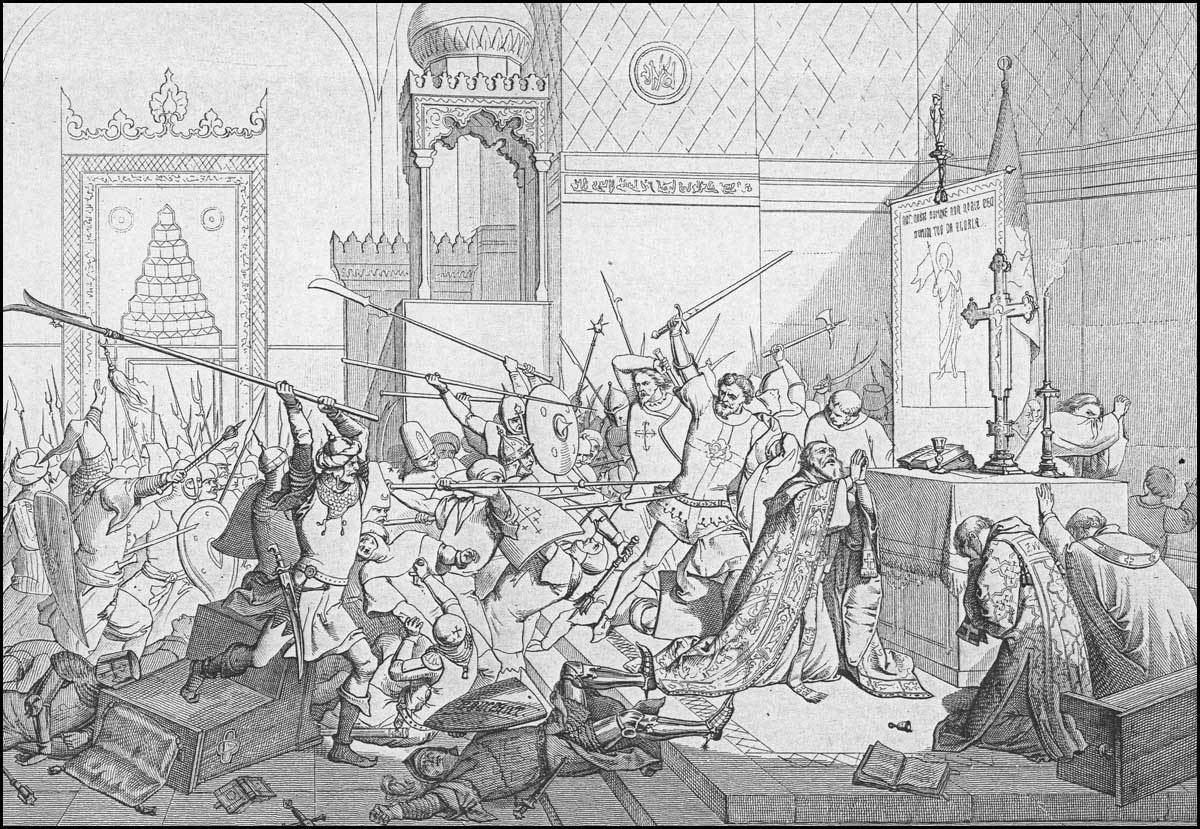
- 19th-century representation of the death of the crusade's leaders in 1345, by Giuseppe Gatteri
Date	1343–1351
Location	Around Smyrna, Anatolia (modern-day İzmir, Turkey)
Result	Crusader victory
Territorial changes	Latin reconquest of Smyrna which they hold until 1402

Belligerents
Republic of Venice; Knights Hospitaller; Kingdom of Cyprus; Dauphiné of Viennois; Papal States	Beylik of Aydin; Beylik of Saruhan

Commanders and leaders
Henry of Asti †; Pietro Zeno †; Martino Zaccaria †; Hugh IV of Cyprus; Humbert II of Viennois	Umur Beg † (1343–1348); Hızır Beg (1348–1351)

The Smyrniote crusades (1343–1351) were two Crusades sent by Pope Clement VI against the Beylik of Aydin under Umur Bey which had as their principal target the coastal city of Smyrna in Asia Minor. The crusade was mostly successful in restricting piracy and leading to Umur's death and Smyrna remained in Latin hands until 1402.

== Background ==
Smyrna had been conquered at the beginning of the 14th century by the Aydinids who had used it since 1326-1329 as base for piracy in the southeastern Mediterranean sea. By the early 1340s the Aydinids and other Turkish beyliks had forced several Aegean islands to pay tributes and had devastated the surrounding coastal regions.

The first Smyrniote crusade was the brainchild of Clement VI. The threat of Turkish piracy in the Aegean Sea had induced Clement's predecessors, John XXII and Benedict XII, to maintain a fleet of four galleys there to defend Christian shipping, but starting in the 1340s, Clement endeavoured with Venetian aid to expand this effort into a full military expedition. He commissioned Henry of Asti, the Catholic patriarch of Constantinople, to organise a league against the Turks, who had increased their piracy in the Aegean in recent years. Hugh IV of Cyprus and the Knights Hospitaller joined, and on 2 November 1342, the Pope sent letters to engage the men and ships of Venice. The Papal bull granting the Crusade indulgence and authorising its preaching throughout Europe, Insurgentibus contra fidem, was published on 30 September.

== First expedition ==
According to plan, twenty galleys fitted by the Cypriots, Hospitallers, Venetians and the papacy were to gather at Negroponte on the feast of All Saints on 1 November 1343. On 13 May next year, the united forces defeated a substantially larger Turkish fleet in the Battle of Pallene, at the western prong of the Chalcidice peninsula. Later that year, they were able to catch Umur off guard and launch a surprise attack on Smyrna, in which they recaptured the harbour fortress and harbour on the first assault. Though the allies were not able to capture the acropolis, Umur Bey's prestige had received a severe blow and he was forced to mount attacks by land. News of the victory were quickly brought back via Venice to pope Clement who spread the news to the kings of France and England in early 1345.

In the meantime, the Latins fortified their positions while fending off Turkish attacks. They build a wall and moat around a shoreline suburb where a money exchange and shops were established. On 17 January 1345, having returned from what was likely a foray to secure supplies, patriarch Henry of Asti decided against the advice of the other leaders to celebrate mass in the former cathedral of Smyrna, which lay outside of the suburb. In the middle of the service Umur Bey swept down on the congregation and the leaders of the crusade were killed, including the Patriarch, Martino Zaccaria, commander of the Papal galleys and the Venetian commander, Pietro Zeno.

== Second expedition ==
The precarious situation of the Crusaders in Asia Minor spurred the Pope to organise a second expedition in 1345. In November, under the command of Humbert II of Viennois, the second Smyrniote crusade set out from Venice. In February 1346, it won a victory over the Turks at Mytilene but Humbert did little more at Smyrna than sortie against the Turks and refortify the Christian section of the city. The next five years were occupied by Clement VI with attempts to negotiate a truce with the Turks, who kept Smyrna in a constant state of siege by land and direct financial and military aid to the city. Although Clement's concern with the Crusade ended abruptly in September 1351, the city of Smyrna remained in Christian hands until the Siege of Smyrna by the Timurids in 1402.

== Sources ==
- Carr, Mike. 2014. "Humbert of Viennois and the Crusade of Smyrna: A Reconsideration". Crusades 13 (1): 237–51.
- Carr, Mike (2015). Merchant Crusaders in the Aegean, 1291-1352. Boydell & Brewer. ISBN 978-1-84383-990-3.
- Gay, Jules. 1904. Le pape Clément VI et les affaires d'Orient. PhD thesis.
- Savvides, Alexios G. C. (30 August 2006). "Smyrna Crusade (1344)". In Murray, Alan V. (ed.). The Crusades: An Encyclopedia [4 volumes]. Bloomsbury Publishing USA. pp. 1116–1118. ISBN 978-1-57607-863-1.
- Setton, Kenneth M. (1976). The Papacy and the Levant (1204–1571), Volume I: The Thirteenth and Fourteenth Centuries. Vol. 1. Philadelphia: The American Philosophical Society. pp. 184–223. ISBN 0-87169-114-0.
