= Umur =

Anatolian Turkish Bey

Umur of Aydin
- Gazi
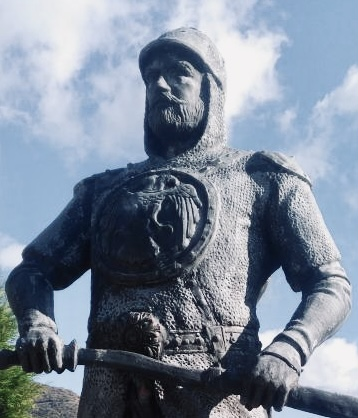
- Statue of Umur of Aydin

Bey of Aydinids
- Reign: 1334-1348
- Predecessor: Mehmed Bey
- Successor: Hizir Bey
- Born: 1309
- Died: 1348 (aged 38–39); Smyrna
- Issue: Hundi Melek Hatun; Azize Melek Hatun; Gürci Melek Hatun
- Father: Mehmed Bey
- Religion: Sunni Islam
- Military career
- Conflicts: Byzantine civil war of 1341–1347; Smyrniote crusades †

Umur Ghazi, Ghazi Umur, or Umur the Lion (Modern Turkish: Aydınoğlu Umur Bey, c. 1309–1348), also known as Umur Pasha was the second Turkoman bey of Aydin, on the Aegean coast of Anatolia, from 1334 to 1348. He was famous for his naval expeditions. During his reign, he fought off many Crusades against him called out by the Pope.

== Career ==
Umur Ghazi was a loyal ally and friend of Emperor John Cantacuzenus of the Byzantine Empire and provided him with material aid during his military campaigns, especially during the Byzantine civil war of 1341–1347. He apparently sent 380 ships and 28,000 men to aid him in the conflict and besieged the city of Demotika in Thrace, Greece. The emperor John reportedly mourned his death. At the height of its power, the Beylik of Aydin possessed 350 ships and 15,000 men.

Umur's preying on Christian shipping led to the declaration of the Smyrniote crusades against him by Pope Clement VI in 1343. In 1348, his fleet was destroyed by an allied fleet from Venice, the Knights of Rhodes and Cyprus. Umur was killed by a barrage of arrows, climbing the walls of Smyrna Castle during a recapture attempt. His older brother Hızır Bey was appointed in his place.

Modern İzmir's district Gaziemir (Ghazi Emir) is named after him.

== Personality and appearance ==
Umur was described in an epic chronicle Düstürnâme-i Enverî, written by poet and historian Enveri during the reign of Sultan Mehmed II, as "the 'Lion of God' leading a just and holy war of conquest against the 'miscreants' and infidel Christians". According to an unreliable but colorful source, two Venetian ambassadors remarked that he was immensely fat with a stomach "like a wine casket". They had found him wearing silks, drinking almond milk and eating spiced eggs from a golden spoon. As a writer, poet and patron of the arts and sciences, Kalila wa-Dimna was first translated to Persian during his reign.

== Sources ==
- İnalcık, Halil (1993). "The Rise of the Turcoman Maritime Principalities in Anatolia, Byzantium, and the Crusades". The Middle East & the Balkans Under the Ottoman Empire: Essays on Economy & Society (PDF). Indiana University Turkish Studies Department. pp. 309–341. ISBN 1878318047. Archived from the original (PDF) on 29 July 2017.
- Lemerle, Paul (1957). L'émirat d'Aydin, Byzance et l'Occident: Recherches sur la "Geste d'Umur Pacha". Bibliothèque byzantine: Etudes No. 2. Paris: Presses Universitaires de France.
