= Aydinids =

Anatolian piratical Beylik

Coordinates: 38°05′21″N 27°44′16″E

Beylik of Aydin
- 1308–1426
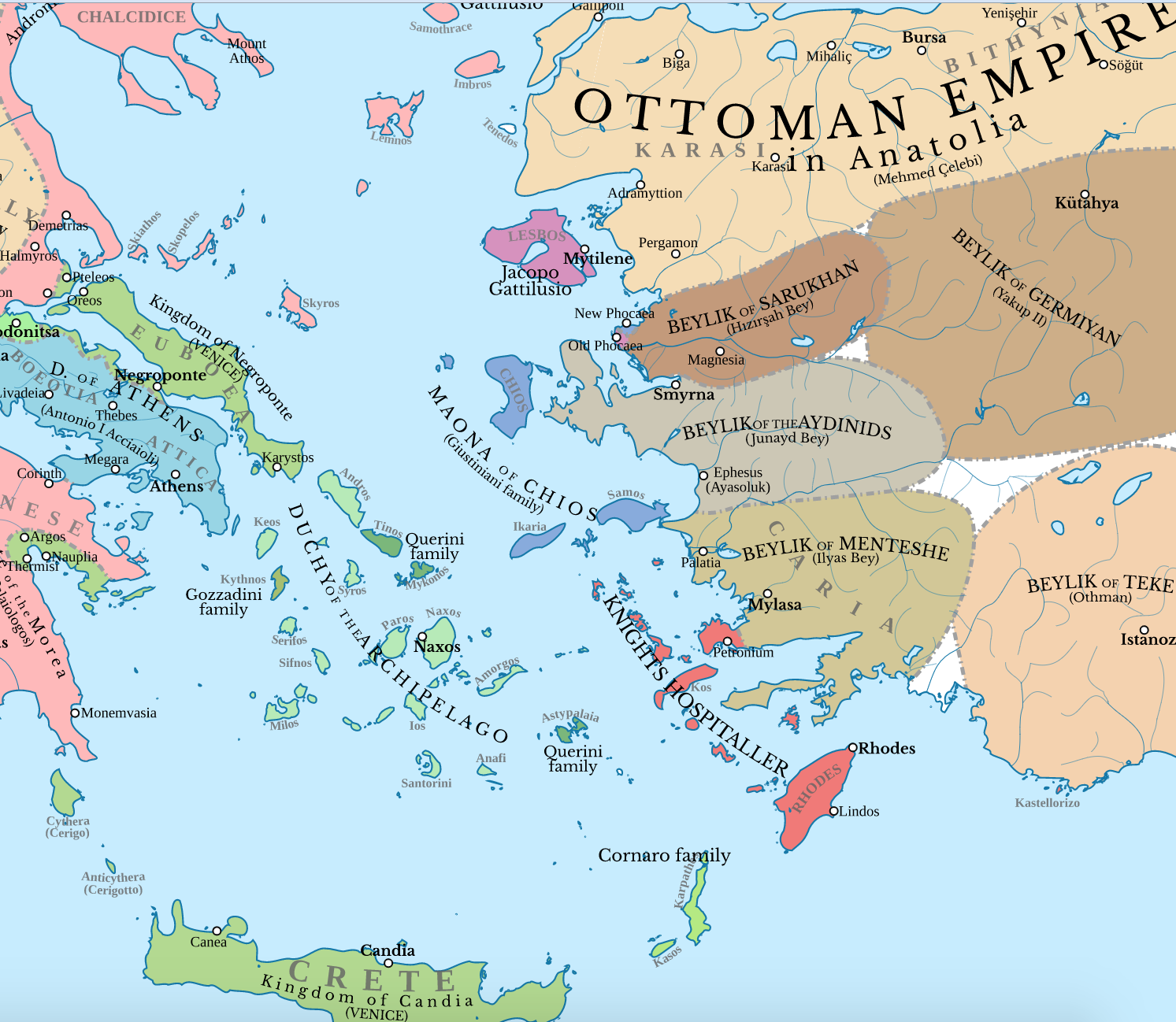
- Capital: Birgi; Selçuk
- Common languages: Old Anatolian Turkish
- Religion: Islam
- Government: Beylik
- Bey
  - 1308–1334: Muharizalsîn Gazi Mehmed Bey (first)
  - 1405–1426: İzmiroğlu Cüneyd Bey (last)
- History
  - Split from the Germiyanids: 1308
  - Annexation by the Ottoman Empire: 1426
Preceded by	Succeeded by
Byzantine Empire	Ottoman Empire
- Today part of: Turkey

The Aydinids or Aydinid dynasty, also known as the Principality of Aydin and Beylik of Aydin (Aydın Beyliği), was one of the Turkoman Anatolian beyliks and famous for its seaborne raiding.

== History ==
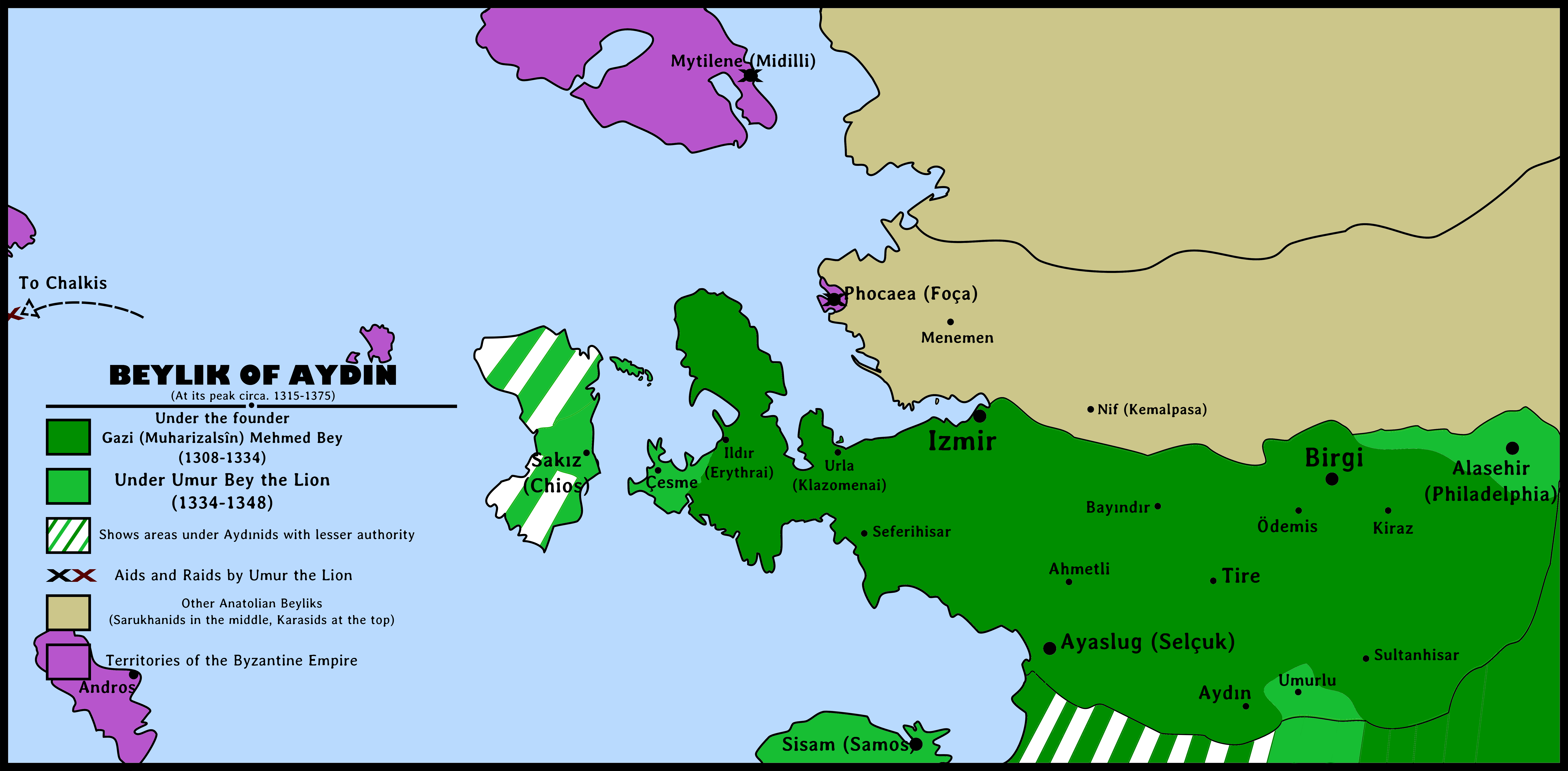
The Beylik of Aydin at its greatest territorial extent

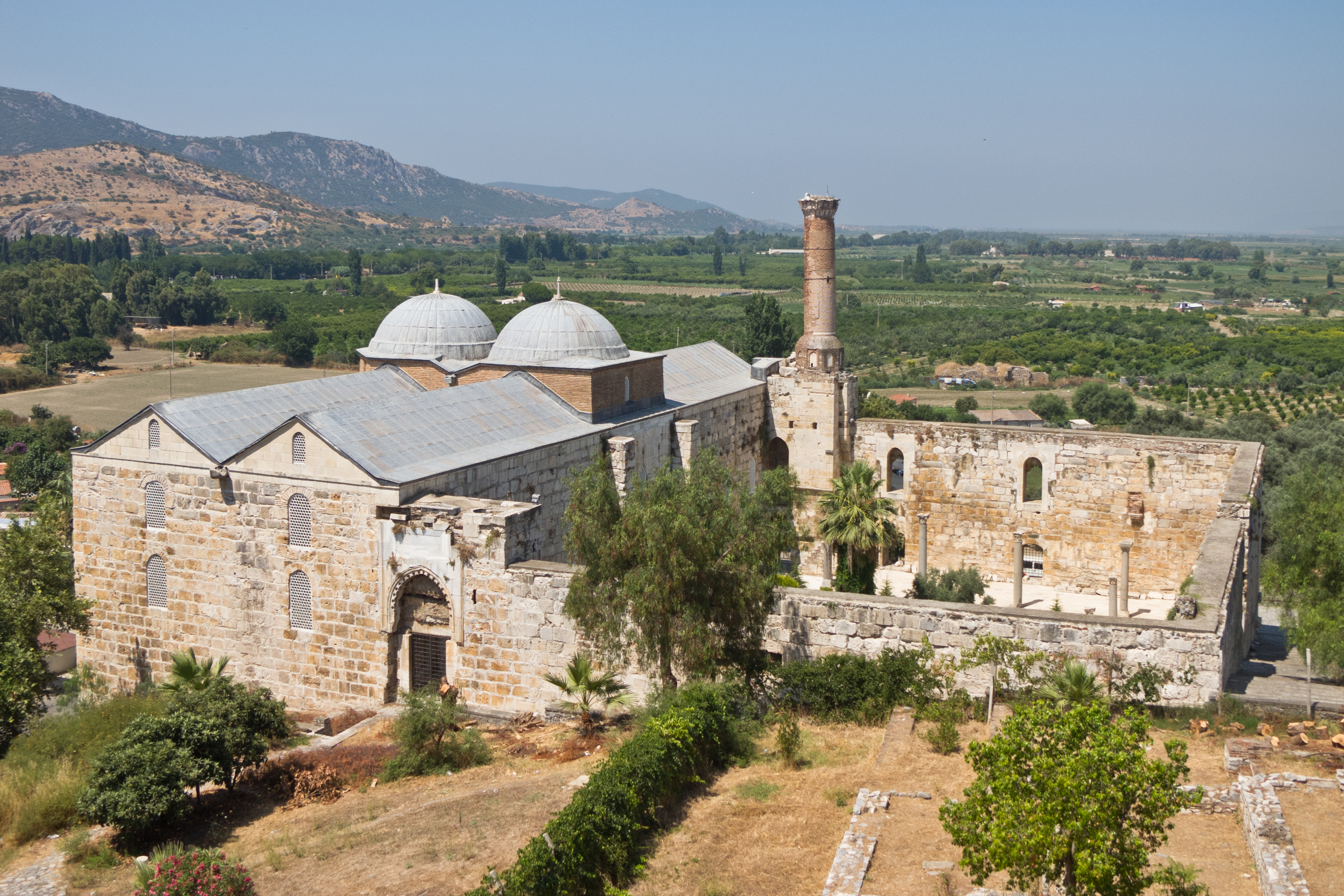
İsa Bey Mosque in Selçuk, built by the Aydinids in 1375

The Beylik of Aydin, originally began as a vassal of the Germiyanids. Along with Sasa Bey of the Beylik of Menteshe, the sons of Aydin conducted a series of raids and conquests, in which they captured the city of Ephesus in October 1304, where they expelled, killed or enslaved much of the local Christian population and pillaged the Basilica of Saint John the Theologian. However, soon after the capture and sack of the city, Sasa fell out with Mehmed, the eldest son of Aydin, before being killed in 1308, which caused Mehmed to declare his independence from the Germiyanids and establish his own emirate.

From 1317–1329, the Aydinids besieged Smyrna. After the son of Mehmed, Umur, finished the conquest of the city, the Aydinids used it as base for piracy and banditry in the southeastern Mediterranean, conducting raids on Aegean islands and devastating the surrounding coastal regions. In 1332 and 1333 Umur launched piratical raids across the Aegean, attacking the Venetian island of Negroponte, along with the Greek mainland.

The Aydinids also participated in the Byzantine civil war of 1341–1347, as Umur was an ally and friend of John VI Kantakouzenos, providing him with material and soldiers for his military exploits, in return for hyperpyria.

The danger of Turkish piracy in the Aegean, the preying upon Christians and the threat the Aydinids posed to Venice and the Knights of Rhodes, were the main causes for the Smyrniote crusades, in which the Crusader coalition conquered Smyrna in 1348 and killed Umur in battle. The Crusaders held the city for nearly 60 years, until it fell to the Timurids in 1402.

== List of rulers ==
1. Muharizalsîn Gazi Mehmed Bey (1308–1334)
2. Umur (1334–1348)
3. Khidr b. Mehmed (1348–1360)
4. Isa of Aydin (1360–1390)
- Ottoman rule (1390–1402)
1. İsaoğlu Musa Bey (1402–1403)
2. Musaoğlu II. Umur Bey (1403–1405)
3. Junayd of Aydın (1405–1426)

== Genealogy of House of Aydin ==
House of Aydin

Aydinid Beylik

'Mehmed Bey r. 1308–1334
Umur I r. 1334–1348	Khidr r. 1348–1360	Isa r. 1360–1390	Ibrahim
Musa r. 1402–1403	Umur II r. 1403–1405	Junayd r. 1405–1426

== See also ==
- İsa Bey Mosque
- Ottoman Empire
- List of Sunni dynasties

== Sources ==
- Carr, Mike (2015). Merchant Crusaders in the Aegean, 1291-1352. Boydell & Brewer. ISBN 978-1-84383-990-3.
- Foss, Clive (1979). Ephesus After Antiquity. Cambridge University Press.
- Nicol, Donald MacGillivray (1972). The Last Centuries of Byzantium, 1261-1453. St Martin's Press.
- Savvides, Alexios G. C. (30 August 2006). "Smyrna Crusade (1344)". In Murray, Alan V. (ed.). The Crusades: An Encyclopedia [4 volumes]. Bloomsbury Publishing USA. pp. 1116–1118. ISBN 978-1-57607-863-1.
- Vryonis, Speros (1971). The Decline of Medieval Hellenism in Asia Minor and the Process of Islamization from the Eleventh through the Fifteenth Century. University of California Press. ISBN 0-520-01597-5.

== Bibliography ==
- İnalcık, Halil (1993). "The Rise of the Turcoman Maritime Principalities in Anatolia, Byzantium, and the Crusades" (PDF). The Middle East & the Balkans Under the Ottoman Empire: Essays on Economy & Society. Indiana University Turkish Studies Department. pp. 309–341. ISBN 1878318047. Archived from the original (PDF) on 29 July 2017.
- Lemerle, Paul (1957). L'émirat d'Aydin, Byzance et l'Occident: Recherches sur la "Geste d'Umur Pacha". Bibliothèque byzantine: Etudes No. 2 (in French). Paris: Presses Universitaires de France.
- Stetton, Kenneth M. (1976). The Papacy and the Levant, vol. 1. American Philosophical Society. ISBN 0-87169-114-0.
- Mélikoff, Irene (1986). "Aydin-Og̲h̲lu". The Encyclopedia of Islam, New Edition, Volume I: A–B. Leiden and New York: Brill. ISBN 9004081143.
- Uzunçarşılı, İsmail Hakkı (1984). Anadolu Beylikleri ve Akkoyunlu, Karakoyunlu Devletleri (in Turkish). Ankara: Türk Tarih Kurumu Basımevi. pp. 104–120. OCLC 563553149.
- Zachariadou, Elisabeth A. (1983). Trade and crusade: Venetian Crete and the beyliks of Menteshe and Aydin (1300–1415). Venice: Istituto Ellenico di Studi Bizantini e Post-bizantini di Venezia. OCLC 144691037.
