= Siege of Smyrna =

1402 battle in Anatolia

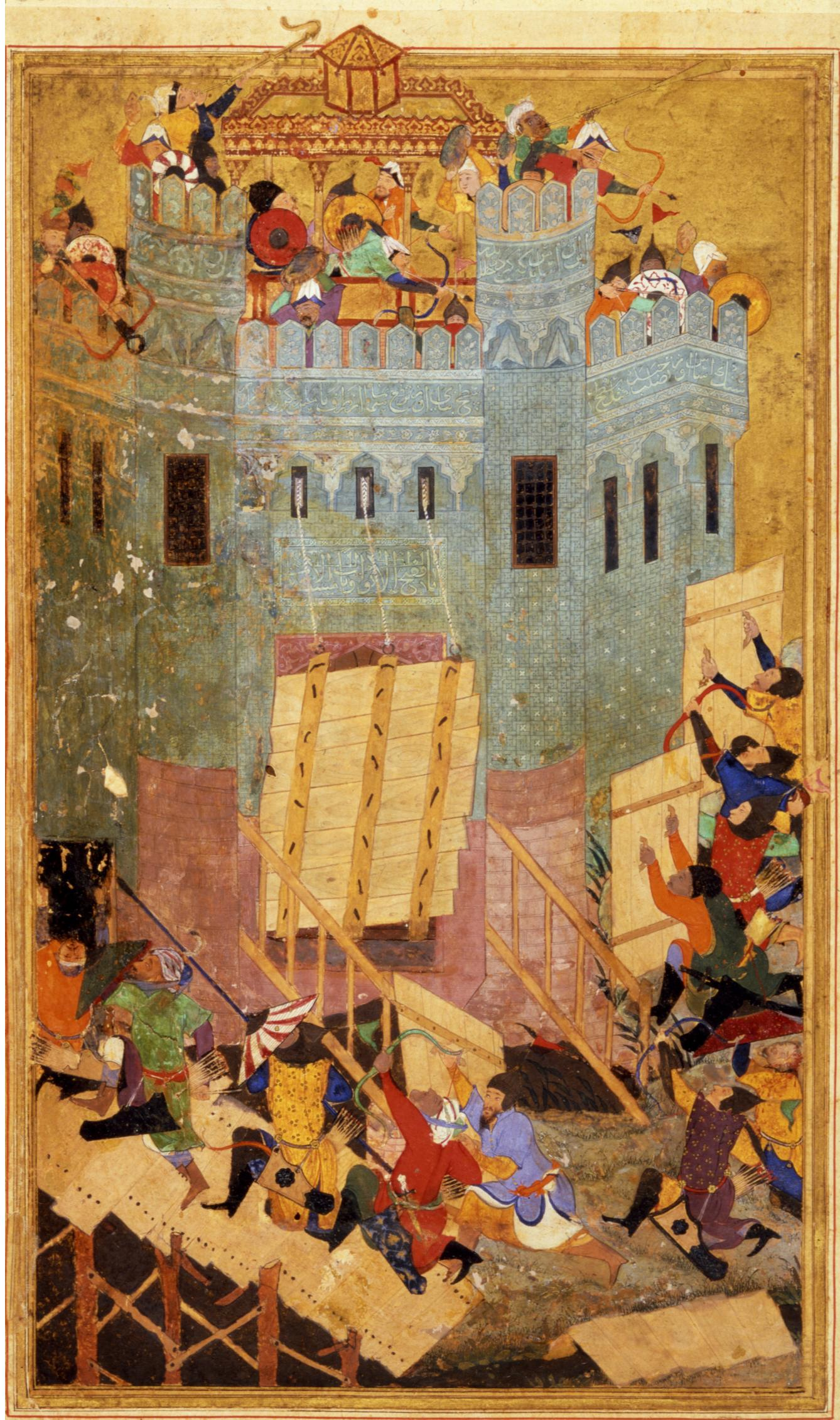
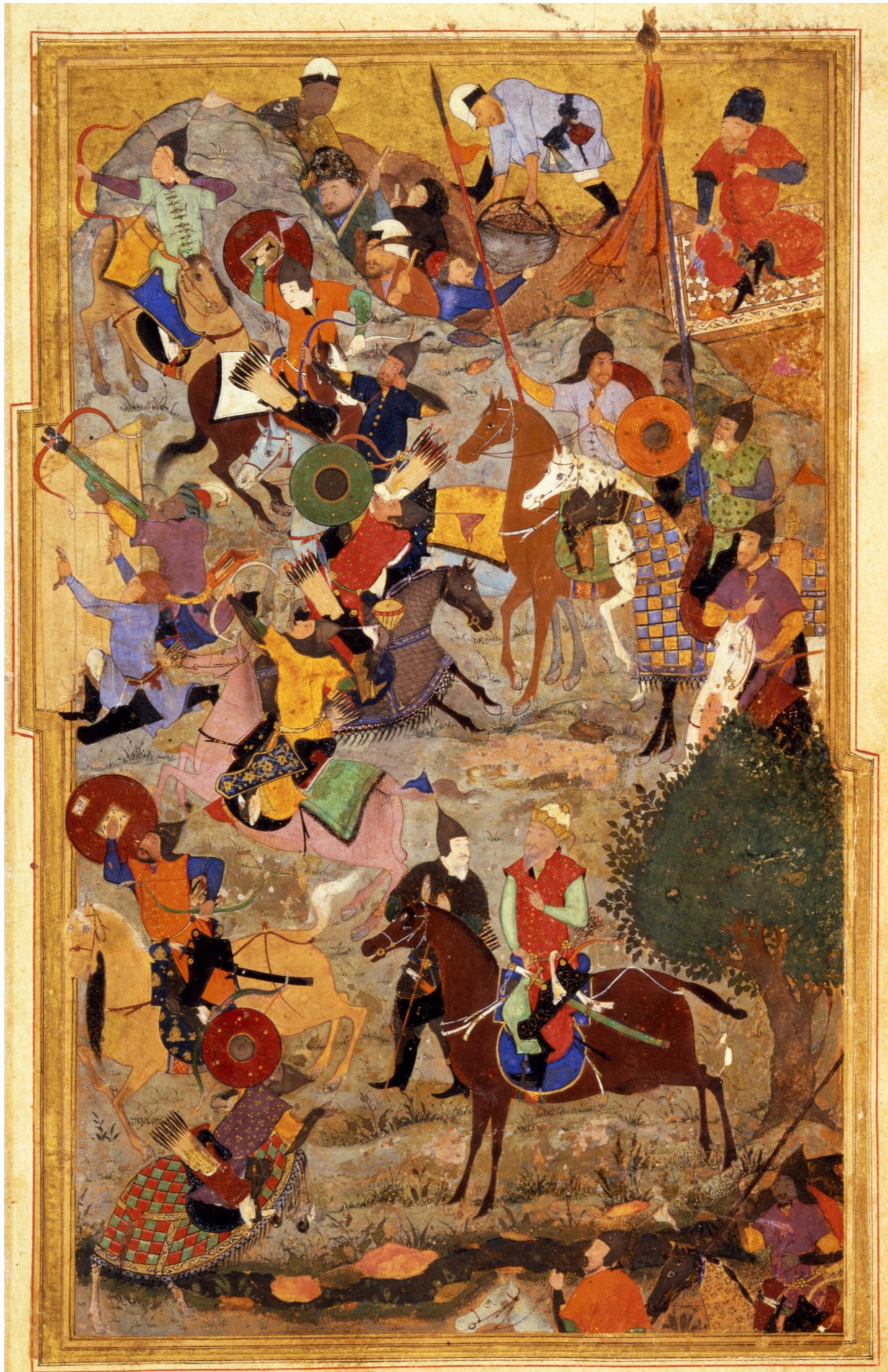
Two Persian miniatures (plates 11–12) depicting the siege of Smyrna from a manuscript of the Garrett Zafarnama (c. 1467), a biography of Timur, illustrated by Kamāl ud-Dīn Behzād, now in the John Work Garrett Library (MS 3) of Johns Hopkins University.

The siege of Smyrna (December 1402) was fought between the Knights of Rhodes, who held the harbour and sea-castle of Smyrna (now İzmir) in western Anatolia, and the army of the Turco-Mongol emir Timur. The Turco-Mongols blockaded the harbour and attacked the fortifications with stone-throwing siege engines, while the defenders, numbering only about 200 knights, countered with arrows and incendiary projectiles. After two weeks of strong resistance against a far superior adversary, the outer wall was destroyed by mining and breached. Some of the garrison managed to escape by sea, but the inhabitants and the city itself were destroyed.

The main sources for the siege are the Persian historians Sharaf ad-Din Ali Yazdi and Mirkhwand and the Arab Ahmad ibn Arabshah, who wrote in the service of Timur's successors. For the Knights of Rhodes, the official history of Giacomo Bosio, written early in the seventeenth century, is an important source. From the Ottoman (Turkish) perspective, there is Neşri and the Künhü'l-aḫbār of Mustafa Âlî. For the Byzantines, there are Doukas and Laonikos Chalkokondyles; for the Genoese, Agostino Giustiniani.

== Preparations ==
Smyrna had been captured by a crusade in 1344 and became a Papal city. The Turks continued to control the inland acropolis, but the sea-castle allowed the crusaders to control the harbour. From 1374, the Knights of Rhodes were in charge of its defences. In 1400, Timur launched a war against the Ottoman Empire that culminated in his victory at the Battle of Ankara on 20 July 1402.

In the aftermath of Ankara, the outpost of the Genoese Maona at New Phocaea sent a certain Galeazzo as an ambassador to Timur's camp to seek terms. He remained there three days, returning to New Phocaea with an agreement on 22 September. A knight, Brother Dominic de Alamania, (Note: On 17 February 1402, the grand master appointed Dominic commander for life of Rogera (an unidentified place) and Finica on Cyprus. These commanderies had an annual revenue totaling 1,000 florins. In exchange, Dominic gave the order 11,200 florins and was permitted thereafter to remit only 500 florins per year from Rogera and Finica.) was then sent to the island of Chios, also belonging to the Genoese Maona, in order to persuade the local leaders not to ally with Timur.

While Timur's forces ravaged the Anatolian countryside, targeting Turkish settlements, the Knights of Rhodes prepared the defence of Smyrna. In 1398, under the direction of Brother Guillaume de Munte, a deep ditch had been dug across the promontory to separate the castle from the mainland. In 1402, the garrison of Smyrna numbered 200 knights under the command of the Aragonese castellan Íñigo de Alfaro. The garrison's pay was raised to 100 florins per knight per year. To cover the increased costs of defence of Smyrna, the central convent authorised an extraordinary subvention of 20,000 florins from the priories. (Note: 3,200 from Saint-Gilles; 3,000 from France; 2,500 from Amposta; 2,500 from England; 2,000 from Auvergne; 2,000 from Catalonia; 1,500 from Castile and León; 1,200 from Aquitaine; 1,000 from Germany and Bohemia; 800 from Champagne; and 800 from Toulouse.)

Defensive preparations in the summer of 1402 were overseen by Admiral Buffilo Panizzatti, (Note: Sometimes spelled Panizati or Panizato. He was the prior of Barletta from 4 March 1395. He was promoted to admiral prior to 5 June 1402, when the grand master authorised a payment of 740 gold ducats from the revenues of the commandery of Cyprus to Buffilo for his two trips to Smyrna, one for training the garrison and another for constructing a "palisade".) with a view to strengthening the system of defence before the expected Turco-Mongol assault. Munitions, supplies, money and reinforcements were continually arriving in the port. The attitude of the garrison was confident. According to Timurid historians, the fortress was thought to be impregnable. The Greek Christian inhabitants of the countryside fled to the city for refuge.

In order to avoid the costs of a siege, Timur sent two envoys, the mirza Pir Muhammad and Sheikh Nur ed-Din, to the Knights commanding them to either convert to Islam or render him tribute (jizya). The command was refused, although Buonaccurso Grimani, an ambassador from Crete to Grand Master Philibert de Naillac on Rhodes, records that the grand master sent an embassy to Timur. According to the contemporary papal notary Dietrich of Nieheim, Smyrna would have been spared had Íñigo raised Timur's banner on the walls as he had been advised by a certain "Christian bishop", whom Dietrich does not name but who may have been Francis, bishop of Nakhchivan.

== Siege ==
Timur himself, at the head of his central army, arrived before Smyrna on 2 December 1402 (6 Jumada al-Awwal 805). He then ordered the left army under his grandson Muhammad Sultan Mirza and the right army under his son Miran Shah to join him. The central army began to bombard the fortifications across the isthmus with stone-throwers immediately, and set to work on undermining the walls. At some point, the ditch was infilled. Large covered platforms with huge wooden wheels were rolled up to the outer wall. Each could house 200 men. Equipped with ladders, they attempted, apparently without success, to scale the wall. The total besieging force numbered about 4,000 men.

According to the Timurid historians, Timur ordered Malik Shah to construct a large wooden platform on piles to block the entrance to the harbour, which took three days. Doukas, on the contrary, says that the harbour was filled with stones to block ships. Within a few days, the left and right armies had arrived and a general bombardment was ordered. There is no reference to gunpowder, but naphtha and Greek fire were employed by the defenders. According to Sharaf ad-Din:

[Siege] machines and battering rams broke up the walls and towers, the intrepid besieged never stopped throwing wheeled arrows [sic], pots of naphtha, Greek fire, rocket arrows and stones, without giving way. During this time, it rained so extraordinarily that it seemed that the world was to be destroyed and drowned in a second deluge.

The outer walls were breached after only two days of mining, when Timur ordered the fascines supporting the tunnels lit. The result was an explosion that destroyed the wall and buried the defenders in rubble. Timur's forces then entered the city. After some desultory fighting, the Knights fled to their ships, while the Christian inhabitants were massacred. Some ships that were approaching the city with aid turned back in the face of the siege engines, either because of the danger of stone projectiles or because the heads of the massacred were launched at them. The city itself, or that part of it under crusader control, was completely destroyed. The siege had lasted nearly fifteen days. Some knights managed to escape on galleys, including the castellan, Íñigo de Alfaro.

Before withdrawing from Smyrna, Timur ordered the sea-castle demolished and the land castle guarding the acropolis, previously held by the Turks, strengthened.

== Aftermath ==
In the aftermath of the fall of Smyrna, the Genoese outpost at Old Phocaea was threatened by the forces of Muhammad Sultan. Following the lead of New Phocaea, it surrendered without a fight. Francesco II Gattilusio, the lord of the island of Lesbos, also surrendered to Muhammad Sultan and offered to pay tribute. The Genoese authorities on the island of Chios and the Ottoman prince İsa Çelebi both sent envoys to Timur at Ayasoluk offering to do homage. As a result of these surrenders, Timur gained control of two Aegean islands even though he had no navy.

The siege of Smyrna was not widely reported in western Europe, but it did raise awareness of Timur's military power. News of the loss of Smyrna had reached King Martin of Aragon, via Byzantine channels, by 28 February 1403, for on that day he wrote a letter deeply critical of Timur to Henry III of Castile. In March, he mooted the idea of an anti-Timurid crusade to the Avignon Pope Benedict XIII. In general, however, the European attitude to Timur was more positive, since he had defeated the Ottomans who had been menacing the Byzantine Empire (and Smyrna) for decades.

According to Andrea Redusio de Quero in his Chronicon Tarvisinum, Timur took great pride in the conquest of Smyrna, since it had resisted so many Ottoman attempts before. From Smyrna, Timur also sent envoys to Damietta to inform the Mamluk Sultanate of his victory over the Ottomans and to conclude a peace treaty. He promised not to encroach on Mamluk lands and the Sultan an-Nasir Faraj agreed to peace.

With Smyrna lost and the Ottoman state in shambles, Philibert de Naillac took the opportunity to occupy the site of ancient Halicarnassus further south on the Anatolian coast sometime between 1402 and 1408. There he constructed the Castle of Saint Peter (Petrounion, transformed in Turkish into Bodrum, meaning "cellar"). This fortress remained under the Knights' control until 1523.

== Bibliography ==
- Alexandrescu-Dersca Bulgaru, Marie-Mathilde (1977) [1942]. La campagne de Timur en Anatolie, 1402. London: Variorum.
- Banister, Mustafa (2021). The Abbasid Caliphate of Cairo, 1261–1517: History and Tradition in the Mamluk Empire. Edinburgh University Press. ISBN 978-1-4744-5336-3.
- Boase, T. S. R. (1977). "Rhodes". In H. W. Hazard (ed.). A History of the Crusades, Volume IV: The Art and Architecture of the Crusader States. Madison, WI: University of Wisconsin Press. pp. 229–50.
- Delaville Le Roulx, Joseph (1913). Les Hospitaliers à Rhodes jusqu'à la mort de Philibert de Naillac (1310–1421). Paris: Ernest Leroux.
- Jackson, Peter (2014). The Mongols and the West, 1221–1410. Routledge.
- Knobler, Adam (1995). "The Rise of Tīmūr and Western Diplomatic Response, 1390–1405". Journal of the Royal Asiatic Society. Third Series. 5 (3): 341–49. doi:10.1017/S135618630000660X. S2CID 162421202.
- Luttrell, Anthony (1975). "The Hospitallers at Rhodes, 1306–1421". In H. W. Hazard (ed.). A History of the Crusades, Volume III: The Fourteenth and Fifteenth Centuries. Madison, WI: University of Wisconsin Press. pp. 278–313.
- Morales Roca, Francisco José (1999). Prelados, abades mitrados, dignidades capitulares y caballeros de las órdenes militares habilitados por el brazo eclesiástico en las cortes del Principado de Cataluña: Dinastías de Trastámara y de Austria, Siglos XV y XVI (1410–1599). Vol. I. Madrid: Hidalguía.
- Nicolle, David (2007). Crusader Castles in Cyprus, Greece and the Aegean 1191–1571. Oxford: Osprey.
- Purton, Peter (2010). A History of the Late Medieval Siege, 1200–1500. Woodbridge: Boydell Press.
- Sarnowsky, Jürgen (1991–92). "Die Johanniter und Smyrna 1344–1402". Römische Quartalschrift. 86: 215–51and 87: 47–98.
