= Aliaga, Aragon =

Aliaga
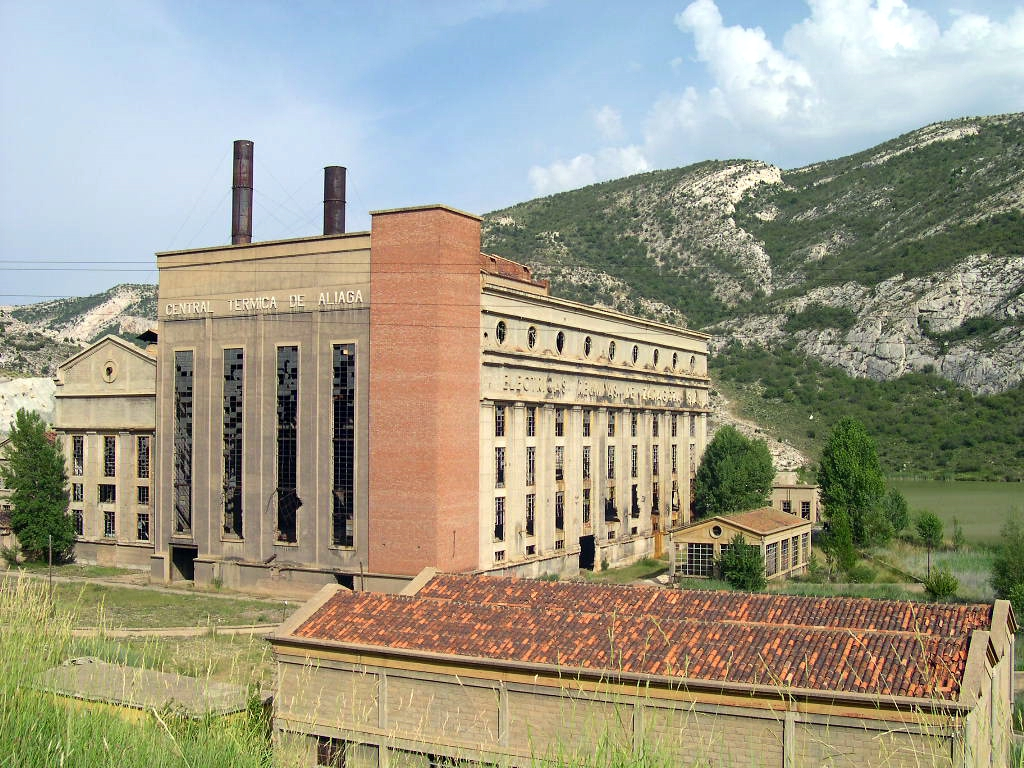
- Abandoned electric plant in Aliaga.

- Flag Coat of arms

- Location in Spain.
- Coordinates: 40°40′26″N 0°42′11″W
- Country: Spain
- Autonomous community: Aragon
- Province: Teruel
- Comarca: Cuencas Mineras

Government
  - Mayor: Sergio Uche Gil

Area
  - Total: 193.08 km^{2} (74.55 sq mi)
- Elevation: 1,105 m (3,625 ft)

Population (2025-01-01)
  - Total: 344
  - Density: 1.78/km^{2} (4.61/sq mi)
- Time zone: UTC+1 (CET)
  - Summer (DST): UTC+2 (CEST)

Aliaga is a municipality located in the province of Teruel, Aragon, eastern Spain.

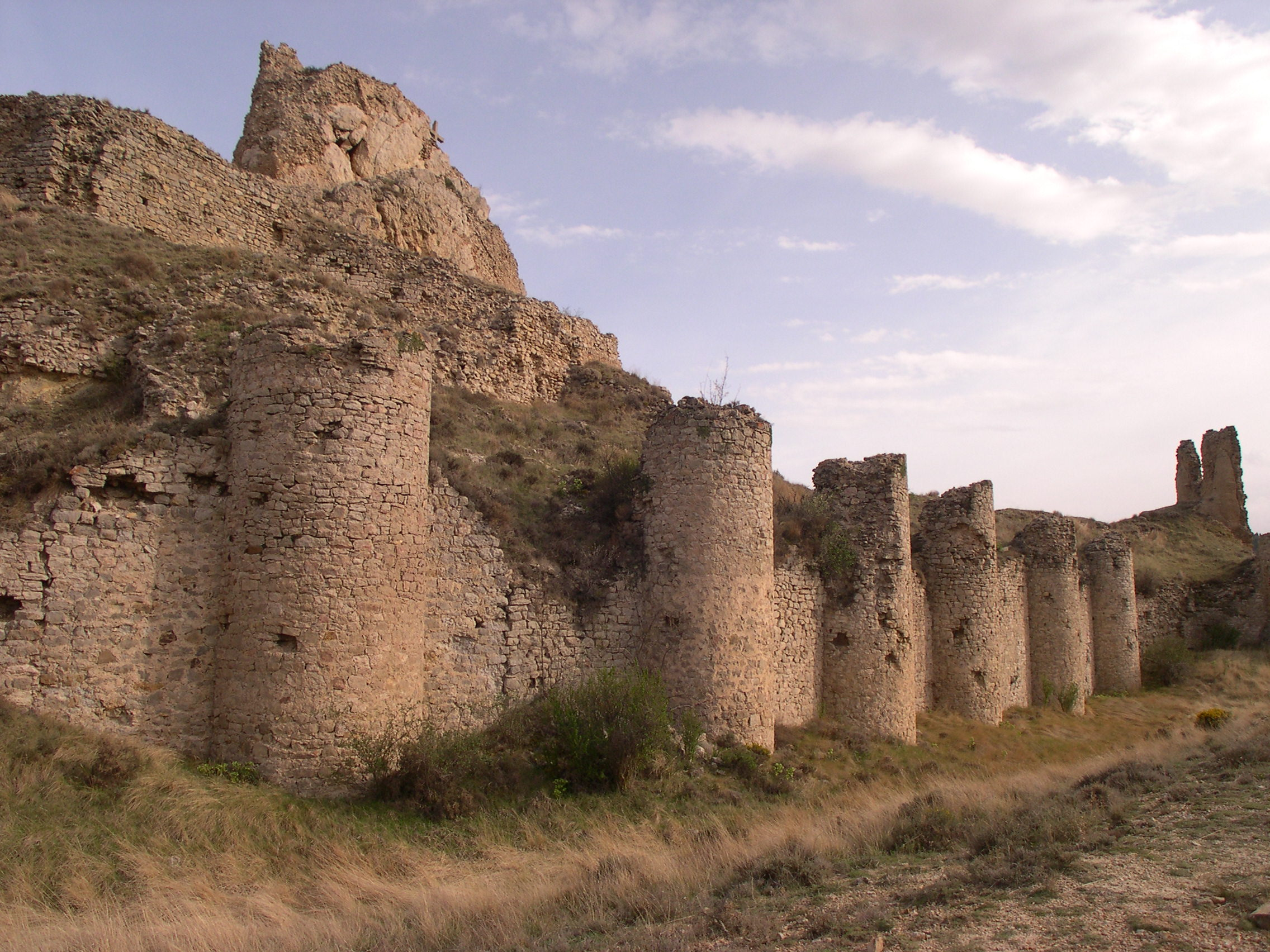

In the early 15th century, the castle was held by Íñigo de Alfaro.

== List of villages in the municipality ==
- Cirujeda

== See also ==
- List of municipalities in Teruel
