= Íñigo de Alfaro =

Aragonese nobleman (1396–1435)

Fray Íñigo de Alfaro (fl. 1396–1435) was an Aragonese nobleman and Knight Hospitaller. He was the defending commander at the Siege of Smyrna in 1402 against the Turco-Mongol conqueror Timur. He later played a key role in the Compromise of Caspe that settled the Aragonese interregnum in 1412.

== Rhodes and Smyrna ==
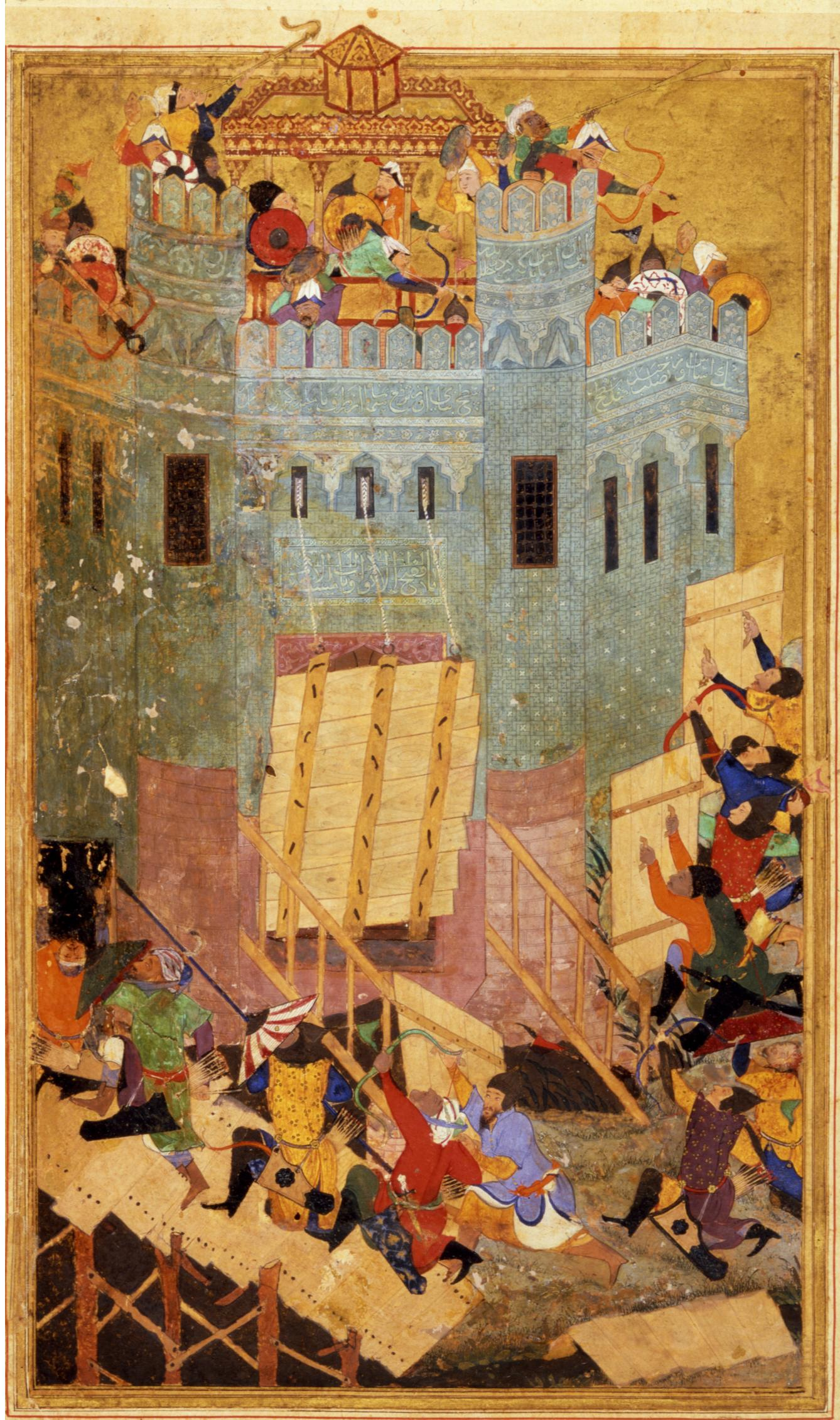
15th-century Persian depiction of the siege of Smyrna

Íñigo was born into a noble family of Logroño. During the rule of Grand Master Juan Fernández de Heredia, a fellow Aragonese, he spent time at the Hospitaller headquarters in Rhodes. One of three coats of arms carved into the lintel above the doorway to the chapel of Saint George on Rhodes has been tentatively identified as Íñigo's. The other two belonged to Heredia and his lieutenant, Pierre Culant.

Íñigo rose in the ranks to become lieutenant of the draper (one of the high officials of the central convent), who was also a Spaniard, and then lieutenant to the commander of the island of Kos, where he can be traced between 20 March 1400 and 17 February 1401.

Íñigo was appointed castellan or captain of Smyrna, a city in western Anatolia and one of the last crusader outposts in Asia, probably on 1 March 1401. Only three documents—22 February, 8 March and 2 May 1402—show him as castellan of Smyrna, but appointment to the office was annual and customarily took place on 1 March. It is for this reason that he is thought to be the castellan in power during the siege of the city in December 1402, since no document that mentions that castellan names him. It would be highly unusual, however, if the castellan in charge in May were not there in December.

The lower town of Smyrna, with the harbour and sea-castle, was under the control of the Hospitallers on behalf of the Papacy. The upper town with its fortress was under Ottoman control. In 1400–02, Timur attacked the Ottoman Empire and invaded Anatolia. With the Ottomans utterly defeated and the sultan captured at the Battle of Ankara, he turned on Smyrna. Although the defences had been greatly improved in a series of projects going back to 1392, Íñigo had only 200 knights under his command. The siege began on 2 December 1402, and they resisted for two weeks before the walls were breached. At least some of the Hospitallers, Íñigo included, reached their ships and managed to escape, while the population was slaughtered.

Despite the loss, Íñigo received treatment befitting a victor when he landed in Genoa. He informed King Martin of Aragon of the loss of Smyrna by February 1403, perhaps having already returned to Aragon by then.

== Aragon ==
=== Compromise of Caspe ===
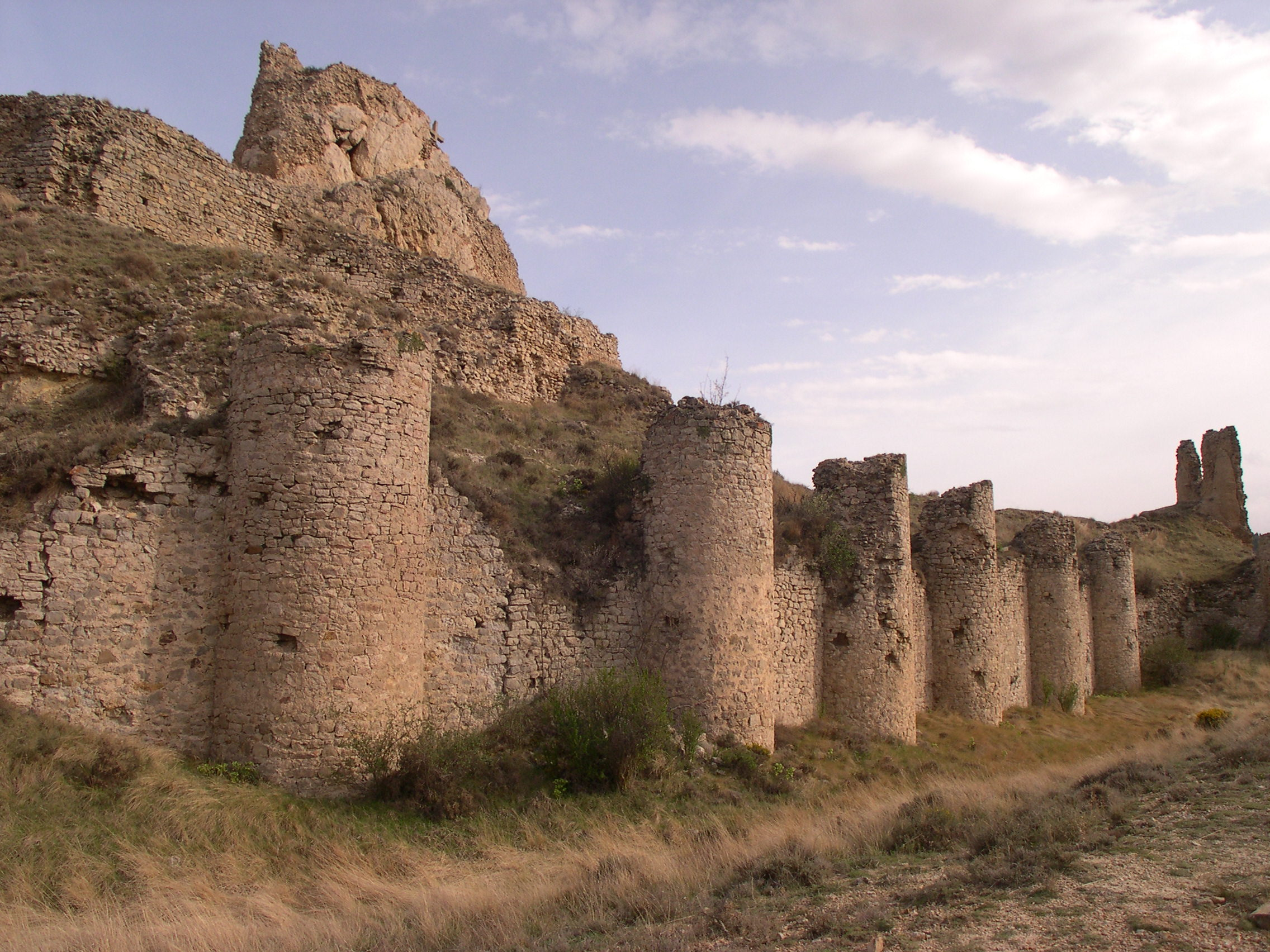
Íñigo's final post: the castle of Aliaga

After Íñigo returned to Aragon. he was made commander of the fortress of Ricla in 1407. That same year, the Avignonese pope Benedict XIII appointed him ambassador of the Holy See to the court of King Martin I of Sicily in 1407.

On 31 May 1410, King Martin of Aragon died and the succession was disputed. It was decided that a parliament of representatives from the three components of the crown—Aragon, Catalonia and Valencia—would meet to settle the issue. When the parliament opened in Calatayud on 8 February 1411, Íñigo de Alfaro escorted the governor and justiciar of Aragon, Juan Ximénez Cerdán and Gil Ruiz de Lihori, respectively, into the assembly. The castellan of Amposta, Pedro Ruiz de Moros, the most powerful Hospitaller in Aragon strongly favoured the candidacy of James II, Count of Urgell. The choice of Íñigo to escort the presidents of the assembly may have been designed to show that the Hospitallers were not united behind any single candidate. Íñigo was subsequently sent by this parliament as an emissary to Valencia.

When a second parliament convened at Alcañiz, Íñigo shared responsibility for the defence of the town with the castellan, Guillem Ramon Alemany de Cervelló, a grand commander of the Order of Calatrava.

Íñigo attended the final parliament met at Caspe, and was present when the famous compromise was publicly read on 28 June 1412. He and Guillem Ramon were then charged with bringing the news to the newly elected king, Ferdinand I. He kissed the king's hand at the ceremony of proclamation and took the oath of homage on behalf of the Aragonese kingdom. He was probably present at the coronation in the Seo de Zaragoza on 11 February 1413.

=== Trial of the castellan of Amposta ===
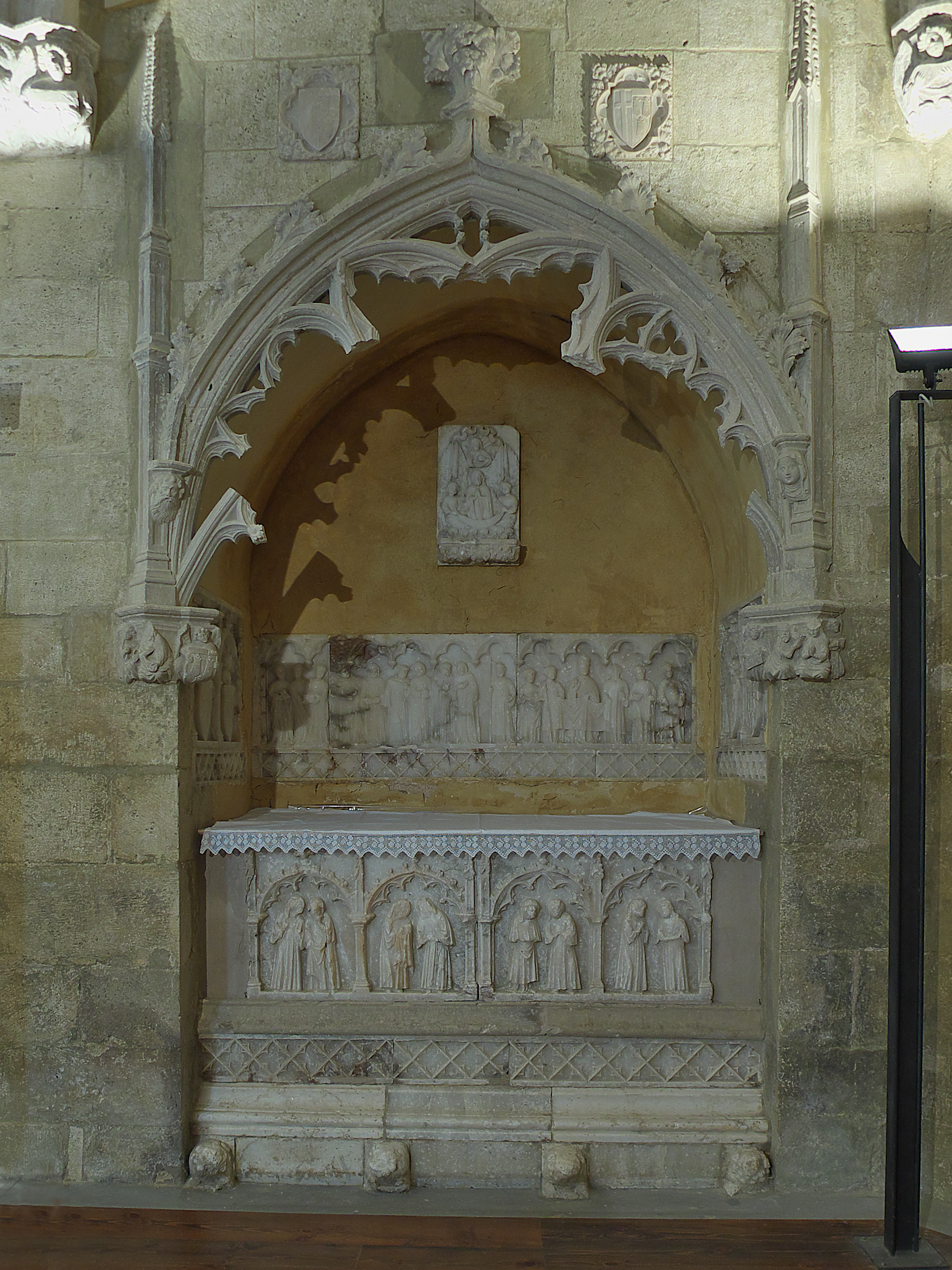
Tomb of Gonzalo de Funes, died in 1420 and succeeded by Íñigo

The castellan of Amposta refused to recognise the new king. Ferdinand thus suspended him from the castellany in 1413, and placed it under the regency of Íñigo. The Catalan corts that met in Tortosa in 1413 summoned Íñigo as "the regent of the Castellany of Amposta" (regenti Castellaniam Emposte). He was still regent in Amposta as of 11 January 1416, but shortly thereafter Pedro Ruiz was deposed and Gonzalo de Funes appointed in his place.

In 1414, a tribunal was convoked by Benedict XIII to try Pedro Ruiz. The tribunal was not limited to his refusal to obey Ferdinand and accept the compromise of Caspe. Íñigo and another Hospitaller, Pascasi de Morralla, prior of Monzón, were charged by the tribunal with conducting an inquiry "into the said lord Fray Pedro, castellan, and his houses and rooms in various places in the said castellany" (in dicto domino fratre Petro, castellano, et suis castris seu cameris ac locis dicte Castellanie). In the process of this inquiry into his lifestyle and business dealings, the Hospitallers took down the testimony of 67 witnesses. In the end, Pedro Ruiz was convicted of everything from concubinage to robbery.

Following the removal of Pedro Ruiz and the promotion of Gonzalo de Funes, Íñigo replaced Gonzalo as commander of the castle at Aliaga. He was seriously ill when, on 3 April 1427, an administrator was appointed for him. He was still ill seven years later on 16 August 1434, when the grand master, a Catalan, Antoni de Fluvià, expressed concern. He is last mentioned on 28 March 1435.

== Bibliography ==
- Alanyà i Roig, Josep (2002). "Procés inquisitorial contra el catellà d'Amposta Fra Pedro Roiç de Moros a la cúria pontificia del papa Benet XIII (1414–1418)". Anuario de Estudios Medievales. 32 (1): 199–292. doi:10.3989/aem.2002.v32.i1.235.
- Bonneaud, Pierre (1999). "Le Rôle politique des ordres militaires dans la Couronne d'Aragón pendant l'interrègne de 1410 à 1412 à travers les Anales de Zurita". Aragón en la Edad Media. 14: 119–42.
- Delaville Le Roulx, Joseph (1913). Les Hospitaliers à Rhodes jusqu'à la mort de Philibert de Naillac (1310–1421). Paris: Ernest Leroux.
- Jackson, Peter (2014). The Mongols and the West, 1221–1410. Routledge.
- Kasdagli, Anna-Maria (2008). "Heraldry in Medieval Rhodes: Hospitallers and Others". In Victor Mallia-Milanes (ed.). The Military Orders, Volume III: History and Heritage. Ashgate. pp. 79–86.
- Luttrell, Anthony (1975). "The Hospitallers at Rhodes, 1306–1421". In H. W. Hazard (ed.). A History of the Crusades, Volume III: The Fourteenth and Fifteenth Centuries. Madison, WI: University of Wisconsin Press. pp. 278–313.
- Morales Roca, Francisco José (1999). Prelados, abades mitrados, dignidades capitulares y caballeros de las órdenes militares habilitados por el brazo eclesiástico en las cortes del Principado de Cataluña: Dinastías de Trastámara y de Austria, Siglos XV y XVI (1410–1599). Vol. I. Madrid: Hidalguía.
