= Cirujeda =

- Location in Spain
- Coordinates: 40°44′44″N 0°40′53″W
- Country: Spain
- Province: Teruel
- Comarca: Cuencas Mineras
- Municipality: Aliaga
- Elevation: 1,150 m (3,770 ft)

Population (2013)
  - Total: 17
- Website: http://cirujeda.com.es

Cirujeda (Aragonese: Cirulleda) is a village in Teruel, Aragón, Spain. It is part of the municipality of Aliaga.

== See also ==
- List of municipalities in Teruel
