= Garrett Zafarnama =

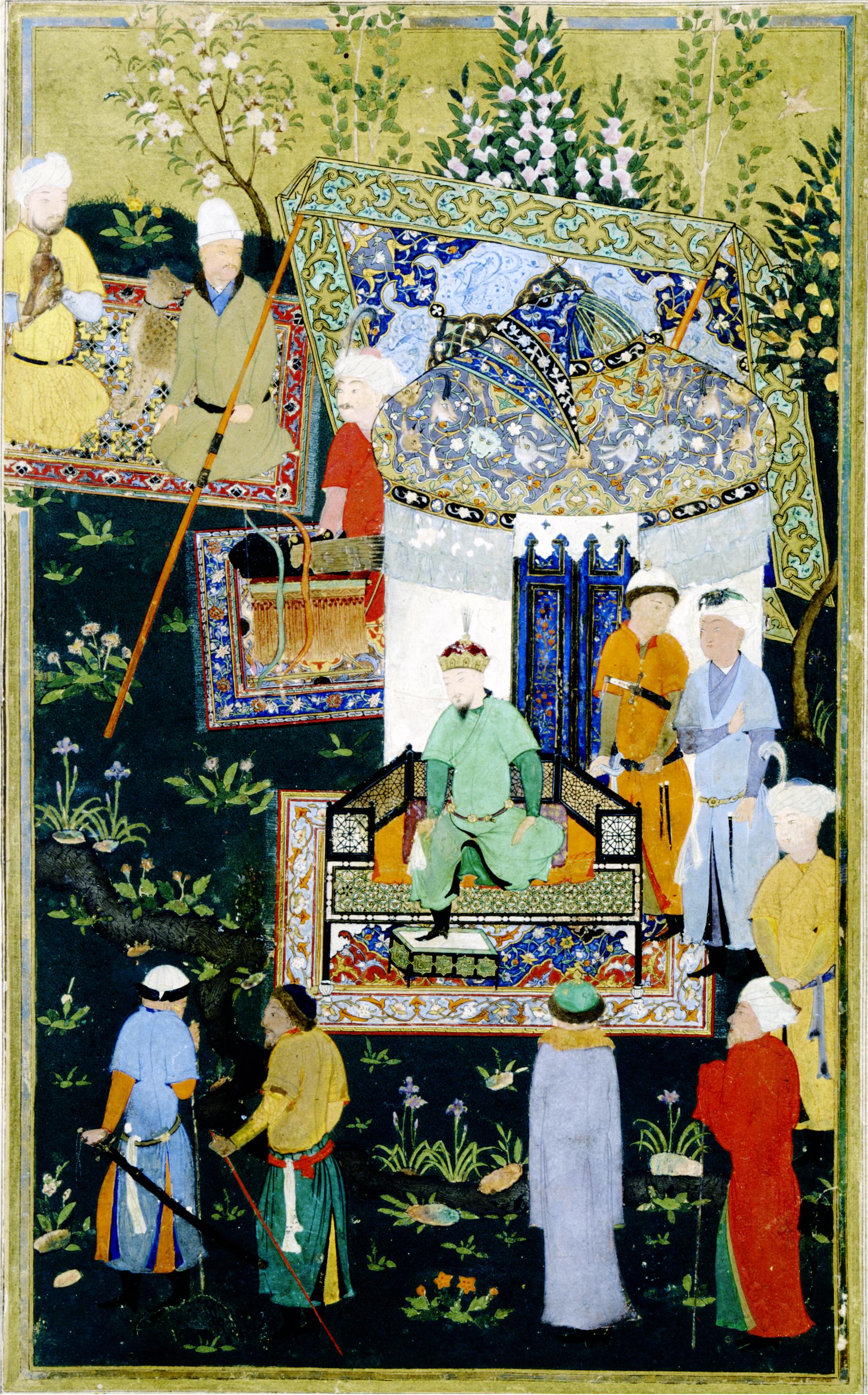
Timur granting audience on the occasion of his accession in Balkh, from the Garrett Zafarnama

The Garrett Zafarnama (or Baltimore Zafarnama or Zafarnama of Sultan Husayn Mirza) is an early manuscript of the Zafarnama (Book of Victories) by Sharaf ad-Din Ali Yazdi now in the Johns Hopkins University Library in Baltimore, Maryland, USA.

The manuscript has twelve Persian miniatures, in six double page spreads, and was made around 1467-8, possibly in Herat. The colophon states that the manuscript was the work of "the most humble Shir Ali," who was a popular scribe in his day. It was believed by the author of a later Mughal inscription that the six illustrations were painted by the renowned artist, Kemal a-Din Kamāl ud-Dīn Behzād, and the manuscript was one of the treasures of the Mughal Imperial library under Jahangir. However, modern scholars consider this attribution unlikely; Behzad would have been improbably young for such an important commission at the time.

Several versions of the Zafarnama of Timur exist, however out of the versions written in the fifteenth century, only three illustrated copies survive, the Zafarnama of Ibrahim Sultan, the Garrett Zafarnama, and the Turk ve Islam Eserleri Mflzesi Zafarnama. The variety of versions of the Zafarnama can be attributed to the wide variety of patrons who commissioned the production of this manuscript. Each patron had different personal tastes and goals for their version of the Zafarnama, which influenced the choices of illustrations and design executed by the artists of their choosing.

== Background ==
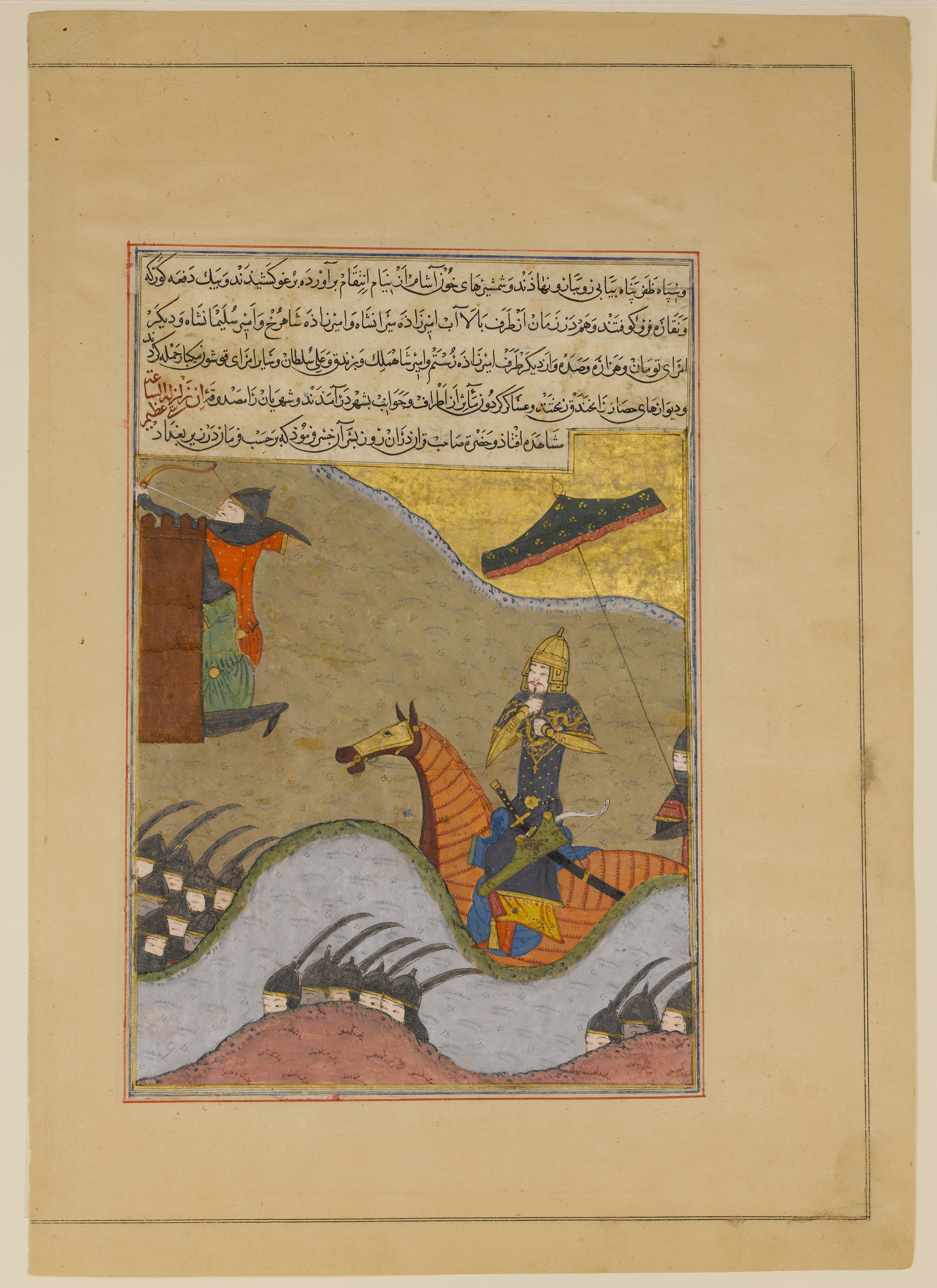
"Conquest of Baghdad by Timur", Folio from an earlier manuscript of the Zafarnama (Book of Victories): Ibrahim Sultan's copy of 1436

The Zafarnama, which translates to "Book of Victories," is a panegyric book written by Sharif al-Din ‘Ali Yazdi approximately two decades after the death of its main subject, Timur, the Turco-Mongol Persianate conqueror. It was commissioned by Ibrahim Sultan, Timur's grandson between 1424–28, and remains one of the best-known sources of Timur's life. The text was written using the notes taken by royal scribes and secretaries of Timur, suggesting that the history of the book was based on a careful and desired selection of facts.

== Author ==
Sharif al-Din Ali’ Yazdi, also known by his pen name Sharaf, was a 15th century scholar who authored several works in the arts and sciences, including mathematics, astronomy, enigma, literature such as poetry, and history, the Zafarnama being his most famous(539). He was born in the affluent city of Yazd, Iran in the 1370’s. He devoted much of his life to scholarship, furthering his education in Syria and Egypt until Timur’s death in 1405 (1,19). Yazdi was directed to write a biography of Timur in 1421 known as the Zafarnama, completing it four years later in 1425. Timur’s grandson Sultan Abu al-Fath Ibrahim Mirza was patron during the completion of his father’s biography (Monfared 539).

== Illustrations ==
The Zafarnama of Sultan Husayn includes six double page illustrations that correspond with the text, equating to twelve miniatures (Sims, 180-1). The pairs consist of four battle scenes, one court audience, and one scene depicting the construction of a mosque. (Natif, 213). Although there are debates about whether the miniatures were painted during or after the text was completed, it is clear that space was left for the miniatures to be added in at these specific points, with the text continuing around the frame set out for the illustration (Sims, 180-1). The double page format of the illustrations is a unique artistic decision, as in this period most double illustration pages were only used for frontispieces (Natif, 225). Two theories are used to explain this divergent inclusion. Some believe that the design for the Yazdi’s Zafarnama was inspired by the Zafarnama of Ibrahim Sultan (1436 Zafarnama) which had five double page compositions, although the Zafarnama of Ibrahim Sultan illustrates a narrative sequence with the addition of smaller miniatures. (Natif, 25). Thomas Lentz suggests that wall paintings which decorated Timurid elite palaces may have also been an influence on this double page format, inspiring the artist to copy this style onto the pages of a manuscript. Besides the format, the miniatures themselves are also significant compared to earlier manuscript illustrations. The illustrations are brightly colored and display original compositions which reveal a depth of emotion and “psychological reality which relates figures to one another” (Sims, 281). Thus, the Zafarnama of Sultan Husayn stands out as one of the great illustrated texts of the Timurid period.

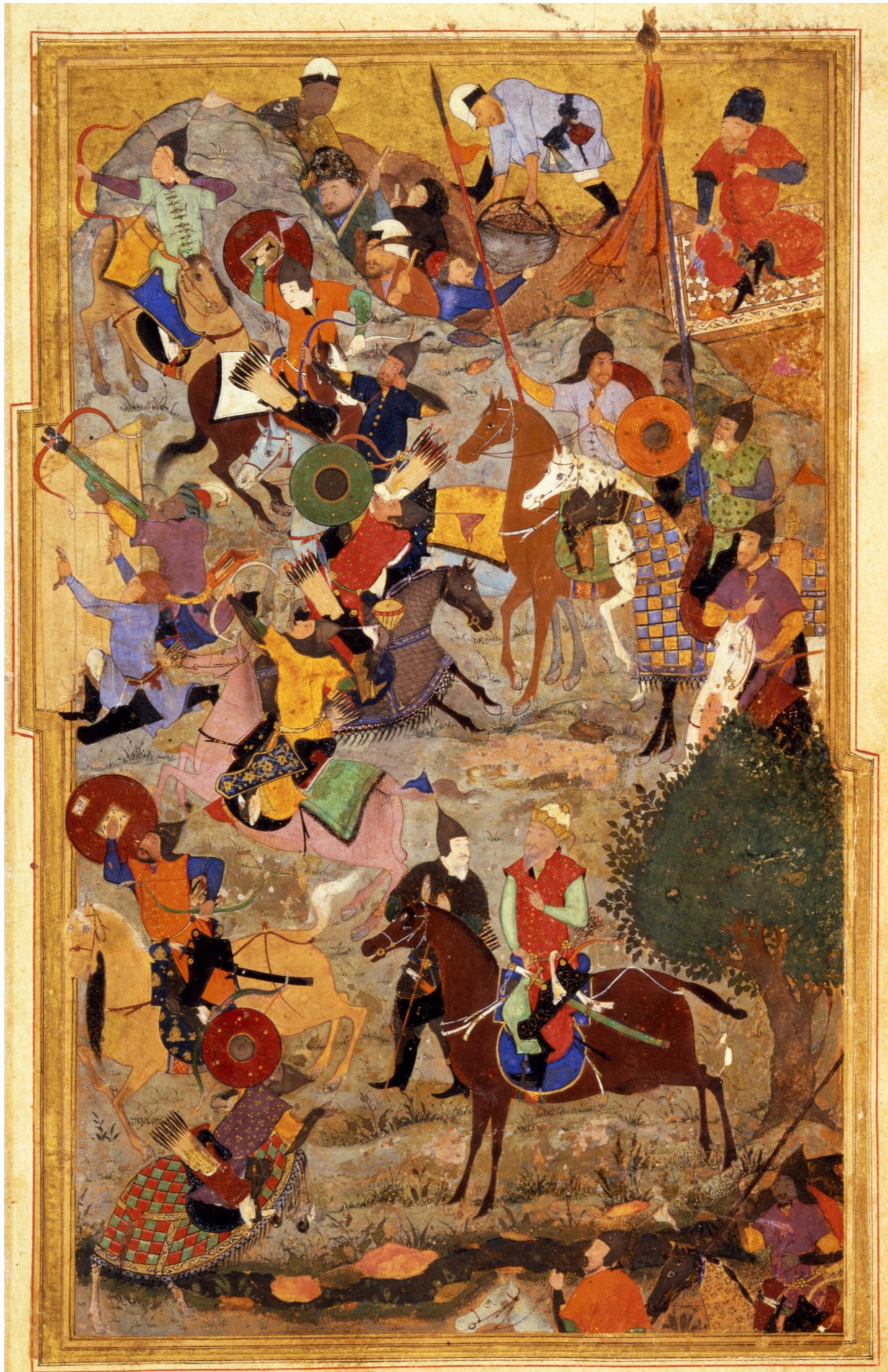
Assault on the Fortress of the Knights of St. John at Smyrna

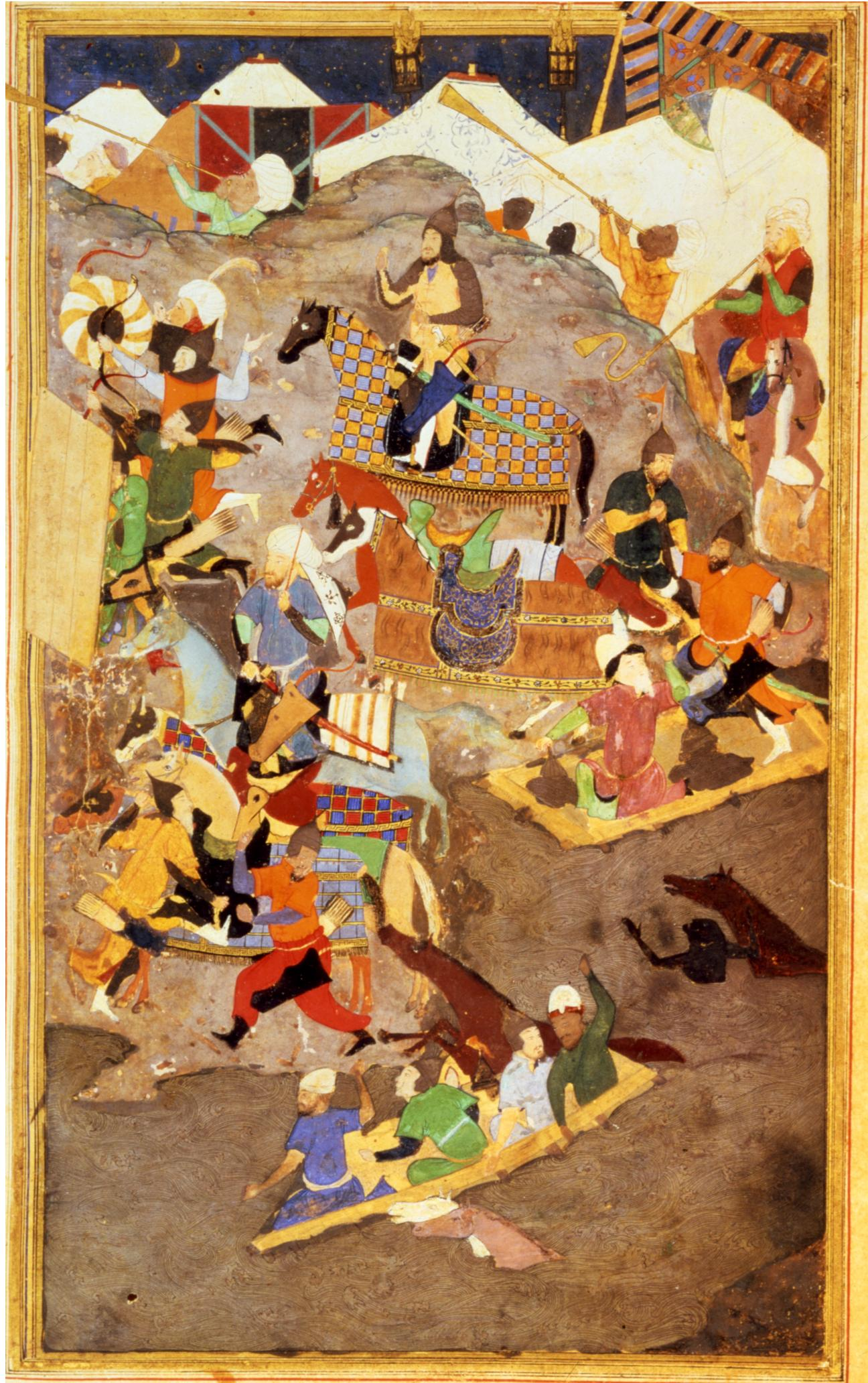
Battle on the River Oxus

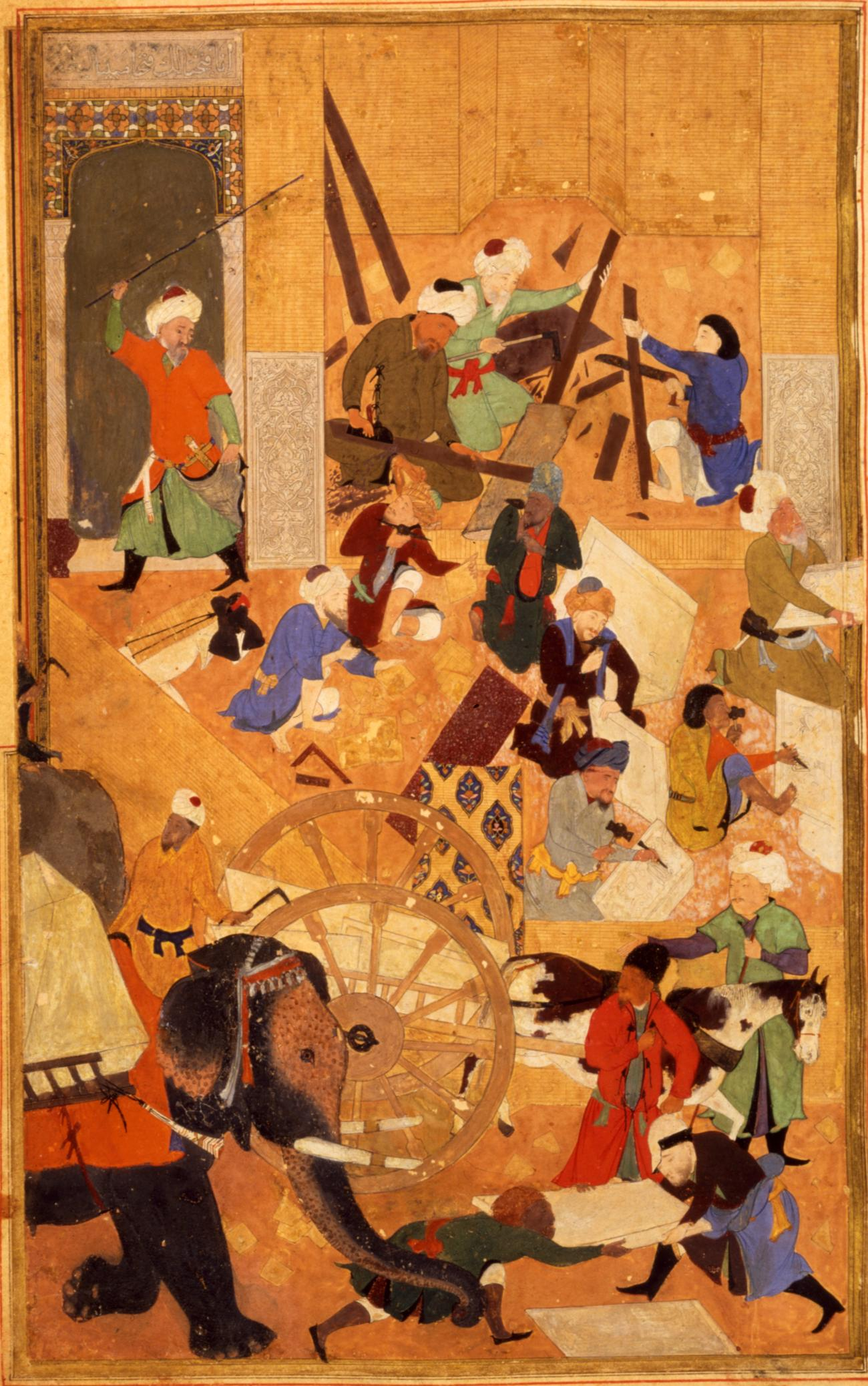
Building of the Great Mosque in Samarkand (left)

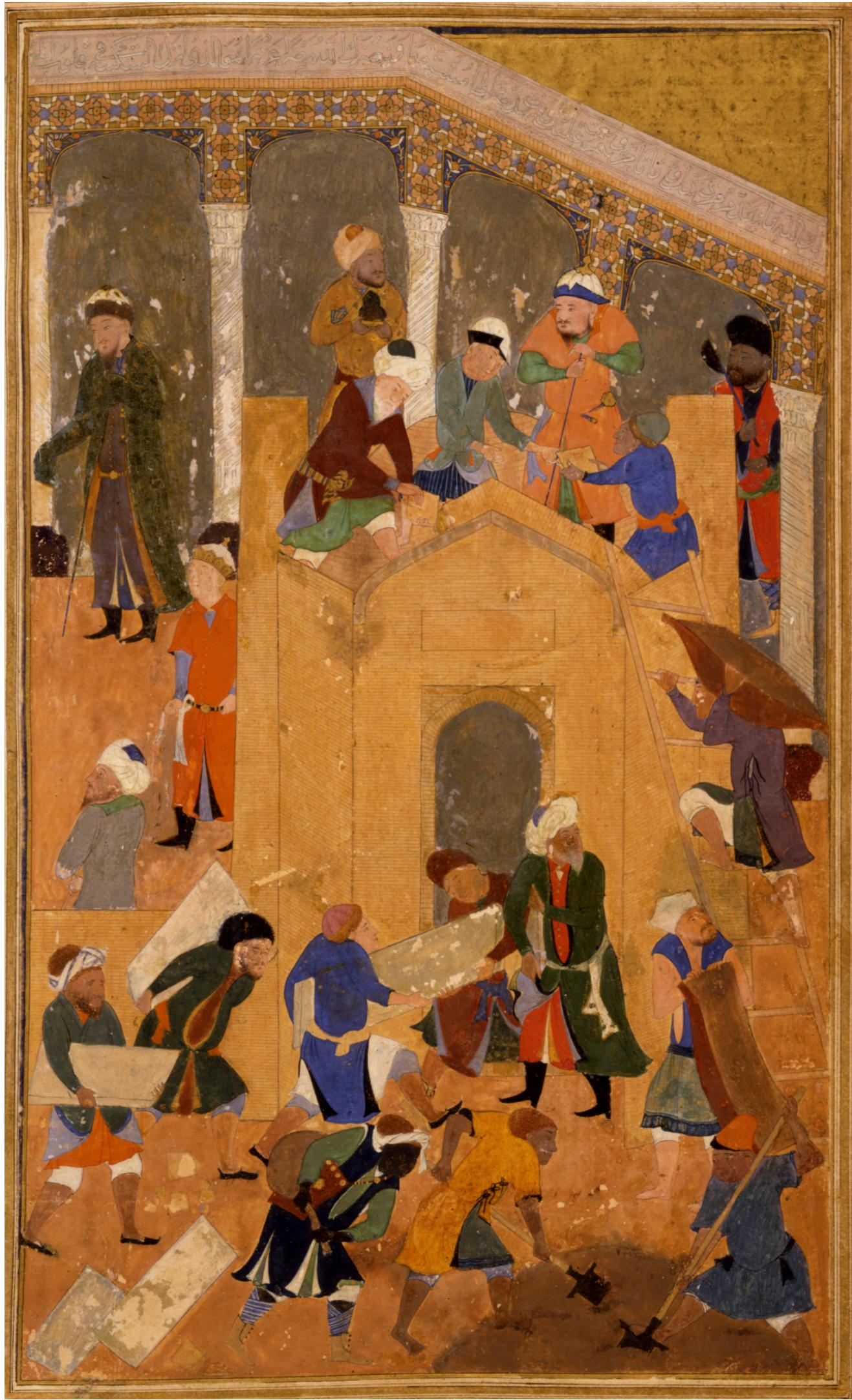
Building of the Great Mosque in Samarkand (right)

== Breakdown of the paintings ==
The illustrations in the Zafarnama of Sultan Husayn fluctuate between images of Timur himself and Umar Shaykh, his second son. The first illustration is labeled "Timur Holds Audience in Balkh on the Occasion of His Assumption of Succession to the Line of the Chaghatay Khans on 12 Ramadan 771/9 April 1370" and depicts Timur, in the center of the page, under a tent, being crowned in the springtime, an almost exact translation of the text into picture (Sims, 237). In contrast to other illustrated coronation scenes, there are no images of dancers, musicians, or feasting, with Sims arguing this was done to ensure that the image conveyed “the precise textual meaning of the solemn occasion it illustrates (Sims, 245). This first image also introduces us to the main character of Timur, who can be identified in later images by his central location in the composition and his green robe. The isolation of the hero in an empty space is a recurring feature in the manuscript (Natif, 214).

The second folio is entitled “Timur's army commanded by Umar Shaykh attacks Urgench/Khiva in the spring of 781/1379”, which shows Timur’s second son attacking an enemy citadel. Umar Shaykh was the great grandfather of Sultan-Husayn, the patron, and by including him in the illustrations as a military hero, he connects himself more closely with the prowess of Timur (Sims, 283-4). This episode is again a very literal translation of the text that relates to it. The composition is animated and seeks to show both horses and men in a variety of positions as they actively fight to take the citadel (Natif, 215). Experts have also said that this folio combines both fifteenth-century conventions and original features in depicting the composition and details, yet it still creates an original painting (Natif, 215).

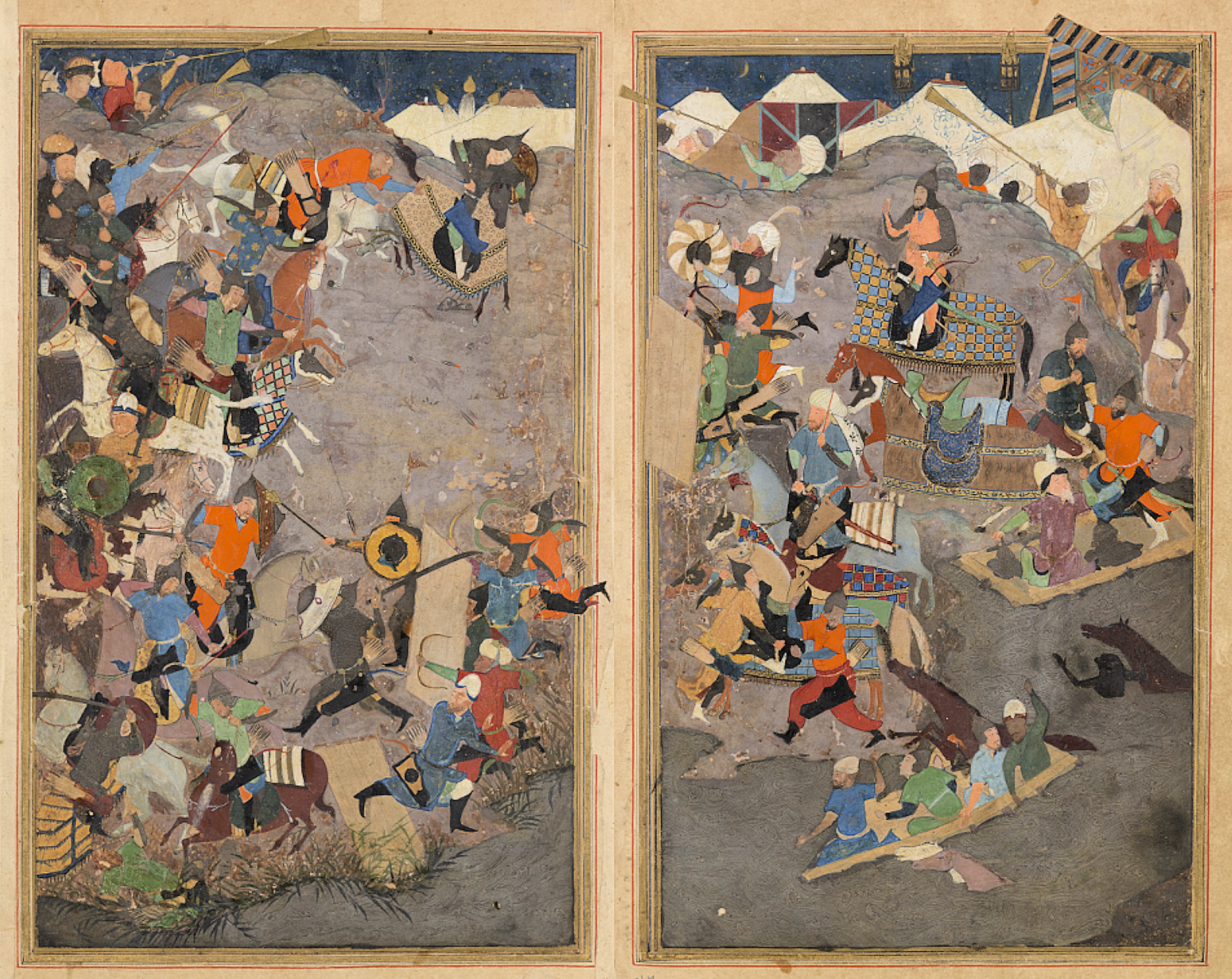
Umar Shaykh outmaneuvers Ankatura in a night attack on the Syr Darya in 790/1388. Garrett Zafarnama, ff. 174b–175a.

“Umar Shaykh outmaneuvers Ankatura in a night attack on the Syr Darya in 790/1388”, the next folio, also shows a battle scene, depicting two armies converging over a river at night. In contrast to the previous two images, this painting is much more ambiguous, both in composition and meaning (Sims, 260). This illustration does not match up with the story in the text, which states that it is the army of Ankatura that surprises the Timurids by crossing the river, while the illustration shows the opposite (Natif, 217). In addition, the composition is also confusing as it is difficult to identify the enemy and main characters in this illustration, which contrasts greatly from the clear and organized compositions of the previous images. Sims concludes that “this painting must be judged on its considerable formal values separately, quite apart from its value as the illustration of a specific historical event” (Sims, 260).

The next image, “Timur's army attacks the survivors of the town of Nerges, in Georgia, in the spring of 798/1396”, is the first depiction of this specific event in Persian painting (Natif, 217). The painting shows the Timurids being lowered in baskets down the cliff face so that they can attack the Georgians that hide in caves carved into the rock. The composition of this scene is more free and flowing than previous images, with a rhythm created through the organic forms of the mounted soldiers and the curves of the rock face (Natif, 218). One explanation for this freeness of composition is that there were very few descriptive elements in the text, so the artist had free rein to depict the scene how he wished (Sims, 261). Some believe that this scene was illustrated because of its “picturesque potential” and propagandistic message of conquering a foreign foe (Sims, 264).

The next image breaks from a battle scene and instead shows “The construction of the Great Mosque (Friday Mosque) of Sarnarqand, began on 14 Rarnadan 801/May 20, 1399.” This illustration is also an almost true match to the text that relates to it. One interesting feature is that the location of the painting is placed in the middle of a poetic phrase which describes the completed mosque, although the image shows the construction of the building (Natif, 218). Yet, these activities of building are taken exclusively from written descriptions in the text (Natif, 218). Although it differs from the previous battle scenes as having no heroic figure, the subject of building a mosque is seen as a heroic action, which is part of the duties of a Muslim ruler, one of the themes in the text (Sims, 272).

Finally, the last illustration is a battle scene of “Timur and his army storming the fortress of St. John in Izmir on 6 Jumada I 805/December 2, 1402.” Like the previous illustration of the Georgian attack, this narrative can also be seen as a propagandist inclusion, this time of a battle against a Christian force (Natif, 221). The word jihad is mentioned several times in the text associated with this picture, and the illustration posits the Muslim king as someone who not only fights to spread the influence of his power, but also for religious reasons. The image again directly follows the text and includes many of the same compositional elements that were used in previous battle images (Natif, 221). Sims describes this as the most “effective” image, as it consists of a clear composition that is complex and includes a unity of aesthetics, making it the best battle scene in the Zafarnama of Sultan Husayn (Sims, 276).

Illustrations can be found by consulting Eleanor Sim's thesis and Mika Natif's article, both found in the references below.

== Function of the paintings ==
The paintings in the Zafarnama of Sultan Husayn are unique in that the majority of the subjects of the illustrations had not been seen in Persian painting before the creation of this version of the text (Sims, 286). It is known that "The Night Attack on Ankatura," "The Rout of the Georgians," and "The Construction of the Great Mosque of Samarqand” do not have any precedents, although they were used as inspiration for future versions of the Zafarnama (Sims, 286). Thus, the illustrations in the Zafarnama of Sultan Husayn were even more important as they had to clearly convey a text that was not known by many, except through one previous copy (Natif, 226-7). This puts more question on why Sultan-Husayn, or the artist, decided to select these vignettes to illustrate, and what he meant by putting emphasis on these stories.

The Zafarnama of Sultan Husayn is very closely linked to the personal history of its patron. At the time of its creation, Sultan Husayn was focused on capturing the city of Herat, and ordered that a copy of the Zafarnama be made for him in order “to prefigure the signal victory he hoped would crown his long and arduous efforts” (Sims, 349). The battle scenes, building of the mosque, and crowning scene, all relate to his eventual goals which would be fulfilled by the capture of Herat. Scholars Lentz and Lowry believe that Yazdi’s Zafarnama was also an important tool of patronage, that would continue to spread the ideology and legitimacy of the Timurids after their fall (Natif, 222). However, the Zafarnama is a small manuscript that was made for singular viewing and was only made for the eyes of the Sultan and his court, making it difficult to be an important patronage product (Natif, 222). Nevertheless, the Zafarnama of Sultan Husayn succeeds in being a text that shows the glory of a lineage and the power and duties of a ruler.

== Authorship of the paintings ==
One point of contention surrounding the paintings of the Zafarnama of Sultan Husayn is about who painted the images that adorned the interior of the manuscript. It was originally attributed to the master painted Bihzad, however, depending on when the paintings were added, he would have still been a young man and not yet a renowned artist. Some believe that the paintings were created around the conquest of Herat in 873, but it is unlikely that an inexperienced artist between the ages of thirteen and twenty-three, as Bihzad would have been, would be given such an important commission (Natif, 222). Others justify that "youthful exuberance" of the paintings and the "lack of anything studied or hackneyed," points to the young hand of the artist. The evidence of emotion and psychological awareness between the figures and the inclusion of a variety of figures in the images is also a hallmark of Bihzad’s style and is used to justify his attribution (Sims, 374). It is also clear that Bihzad knew about Yazdi’s Zafarnama because he “reacts and relates to them [the paintings] in several of his works,” it just remains to be questioned whether he worked on them or was just familiar with the manuscript (Natif, 223).

While the original purpose of the illustrations remains a matter of scholarly debate, their significance is widely acknowledged. According to Sims, the images were likely conceived as political propaganda aimed at elevating the status and alliances of Sultan-Husayn. Contemporary scholars, however, have also argued that the illustrations possess intrinsic artistic merit and can be appreciated as autonomous works of art, suggestive evidence of the hand of a master painter.

== See also ==
- Tuzk-e-Babri
- Tuzk-e-Jahangiri
