= Fidentius of Padua =

Fidentius presenting his book to Pope Nicholas. From a presentation miniature within a historiated initial in the only manuscript copy.

Fidentius of Padua (Italian: Fidenzio da Padova) was a Franciscan administrator and writer active in the Holy Land between 1266 and 1291. He wrote a tract on the Christian recovery and retention of the Holy Land.

== Biography ==
Fidentius may have been a native of Padua or its region, or else was attached to a convent there. He was born before 1226. In June 1266, he was made vicar provincial of the Holy Land, an office restricted by the Franciscan rule to those at least forty years old. That same year, acting on the request of the Templar grand master Thomas Bérard, he sent two friars to the besieged castle of Safad to serve as chaplains.

In 1268, Fidentius was in Tripoli when he received a copy of the Liber Clementis, probably in Arabic, from a Syrian Christian. On learning of the fall of Antioch (18 May 1268), he left Tripoli to visit the Christians captured by Sultan Baybars I to provide for their spiritual needs. He shadowed Baybars' army on horseback for several days, possibly also acting as an ambassador of the Crusader states. The firmans issued by Baybars favouring the Franciscans may be the product of his work.

By 1274, he was back in Europe. He attended the Second Council of Lyon and at the first session on 7 May was commissioned by Pope Gregory X to write a report on recovering lost territory in the Holy Land. It is probable that he had met the future pope on his mission to the Holy Land in 1271. Fidentius appears to have visited the convent of Saint Anthony in Padua in 1283. He was back in the Holy Land again in 1289, when he visited the prisoners-of-war after the fall of Tripoli on 26 April. It was only in 1290 or 1291, shortly before the fall of Acre, that he delivered his report, Liber recuperationis Terre Sancte, to Pope Nicholas IV. The report was probably written in the Holy Land, mainly in Acre. He was still there in February 1290, since he refers to the invasion of Cilician Armenia that took place that month in his Liber.

A Fidentius who undertook some missions in Italy is mentioned in the records of the convent of Saint Anthony in Padua in 1294, although it may have been a different person. The Blessed Fidentius mentioned in some sources must be a different person, since he was clearly dead before 1249. The Franciscan vicar must have died after 1291, probably in Padua.

== Liber recuperationis Terre Sancte ==
The Liber recuperationis Terre Sancte—or On the Recovery of the Holy Land—survives in a single parchment manuscript of the 14th century, now in Paris, Bibliothèque nationale de France, Lat. 7242, at folios 85r–126r. It is written in Latin. It begins with a dedication to Nicholas IV. A schematic map of the Mediterranean appears on folio 122v. The text has been edited by Girolamo Golubovich. It is one of the earliest examples of the De recuperatione genre.

The military focus of Fidentius' plan contrasts with the missionary ideal more typical of the Franciscans. This may explain in part why his work appears to have had little influence. His lack of zeal for martyrdom also contrasts with that of many Franciscans working in the Holy Land in the late 13th century. Unlike more influential plans for the recovery of the Holy Land, such as those of Ramon Llull and Pierre Dubois, the Liber recuperationis is the only one based on firsthand experience of the land and interactions with its inhabitants, both Christian and Muslim. Marino Sanudo probably had Fidentius' text before him when he wrote his own Liber secretorum fidelium crucis.

=== History and geography ===
The Liber is divided into 94 chapters in seven chronologically-arranged sections that clearly divide into two functional parts. The first six sections are the first part and cover the history of the Holy Land under the Gentiles, Jews, Assyrians, Romans, Greeks and Saracens. The last two are more fully developed than the first four. The Greek section is devoted largely to the question of how the Christians lost the Holy Land. The blame falls primarily on moral decline. There follows an explanation for why the Christians should rightly repossess them. The Saracen section is devoted to the life of Muḥammad, for which he depends on the writings of Peter the Venerable. His account is mostly legendary, and he is apparently unfamiliar with Islamic tradition. He draws on John of Damascus, Jacques de Vitry and possibly Mark of Toledo and Petrus Alphonsi. His history of Islam bears a resemblance to William of Tripoli's De statu sarracenorum, which was drawn up for the occasion of the Second Council of Lyon. He records that Muḥammad effectively created the Islamic religion out of what he learned from a Nestorian Christian monk named Sergius and three Jews of Mecca. He did know Arabic, and quotes from the Qurʾān to describe the seven vices he attributes to Muslims: infidelity, lewdness, cruelty, greed, overconfidence, foolishness and volatility. He also backs up his account with personal experiences.

The seventh section, on the rule of the Crusaders, forms the second part of the Liber and is devoted to the history of the Crusades and the recovery and permanent defence of Christian rule. His history is designed to provide exempla (examples) to be imitated or avoided by future Crusaders. He describes seven routes from western Europe to the Holy Land, pointing out the location of enemy fortresses, the potential allies along the way and the logistical difficulties unique to each. His basic prescription is for a joint land and naval campaign. An army would move overland following the same route as the First Crusaders, joining up with the Cilician Armenians, Georgians and Mongols, while a fleet would be operating out of some eastern Mediterranean port.

Fidentius includes some chapters on the topography of the Holy Land, especially of its cities, which would be important for planning the defence and maintenance of the conquests. He stresses the importance of understanding the Muslim way of war and the climate of the Holy Land prior to any expedition.

=== Military strategy ===
The maintenance of the conquests is of great concern to him. He suggests that each bishopric, abbey and city in the West should send one to three or more knights to serve in the East. He also specifies the need for infantry (specifically, spearmen and archers) and shield bearers to protect them from enemy archers. It was important that cavalry and infantry operate together. He lays great stress on the importance of archery, the weakness of Muslim infantry and the necessity of combined arms. His tactical and strategic ideas are taken largely from Vegetius' De re militari, but he offers accounts of Egyptian Mamlūk tactics so Crusaders could better counter them. In particular, he warns about the feigned retreat.

Control of the seas would be required for recovery of the Holy Land. For this Fidentius envisions a permanent fleet of ten galleys and a wartime fleet of forty to fifty (at a bare minimum thirty). These were to be based in Acre, Cyprus, Ruad and Rhodes. This fleet would enforce a blockade on trade between "evil" Christians and the Mamlūks. Fidentius sees this trade as helping the sultan of Egypt in two ways: from Europe he obtains war materiel (iron, tin, timber, oil) and from Asia he obtains dues on goods brought to Egypt via the Red Sea for trade to Europe. If the spice trade were deflected from the Red Sea to Mongol Persia, Egypt would be deprived of customs duties and would also lose export markets because of the reduction in shipping. The Mamlūk sultan may be unable to afford more mamlūks (slave soldiers) imported from the Black Sea. Offensively, the fleet would launch attacks on Egypt to draw Egyptian forces away from the Holy Land. Fidentius was the first crusade theorist to advocate a naval blockade; and his strategy was that which would come to be known as the passagium particulare, a type of preparatory crusade.

The Liber ignores completely the question of financing the expedition.

== Bibliography ==
- Bontea, Cornel (2018). "The Theory of the Passagium Particulare: A Commercial Blockade of the Mediterranean in the Early Fourteenth Century?". In Georgios Theotokis; Aysel Yıldız (eds.). A Military History of the Mediterranean Sea: Aspects of War, Diplomacy, and Military Elites. Brill. pp. 202–219. doi:10.1163/9789004362048_011.
- Dalché, Patrick Gautier (2010). "Cartes, réflexion stratégique et projets de croisade à la fin du XIII^{e} et au début du XIV^{e} siècle: une initiative franciscaine?". Francia. 37: 77–95.
- Dalché, Patrick Gautier (2015). "Maps, Travel and Exploration in the Middle Ages: Some Reflections about Anachronism" (PDF). The Historical Review. 12: 143–162.
- Evangelisti, Paolo (1998). Fidenzio da Padova e la letteratura crociato-missionaria minoritica: strategie e modelli francescani per il dominio (XIII–XV sec.). Bologna: Il mulino.
- Fidentius of Padua (1913). "Liber recuperationis Terre Sancte". In Golubovich, Girolamo (ed.). Biblioteca bio-bibliografica della Terra Santa e dell'Oriente francescano. Vol. 2. Quaracchi.
- Marshall, Christopher (1992). Warfare in the Latin East, 1192–1291. Cambridge University Press.
- Paviot, Jacques (2012). "Fidentius of Padua". In David Thomas; Alex Mallett (eds.). Christian–Muslim Relations: A Bibliographical History. Vol. 4 (1200–1350). Brill. pp. 624–626. doi:10.1163/1877-8054_cmri_COM_24384.
- Riley-Smith, Jonathan (2014) [1987]. The Crusades: A History (3rd ed.). Bloomsbury.
- Rubin, Jonathan (2018). Learning in a Crusader City: Intellectual Activity and Intercultural Exchanges in Acre, 1191–1291. Cambridge University Press.
- Schein, Sylvia (1984). "The Future regnum Hierusalem: A Chapter in Medieval State Planning". Journal of Medieval History. 10 (2): 95–105. doi:10.1016/0304-4181(84)90003-4.
- Simonelli, Fabio (1997). "Fidenzio da Padova". Dizionario Biografico degli Italiani, Volume 47: Ferrero–Filonardi (in Italian). Rome: Istituto dell'Enciclopedia Italiana. pp. 412–414. ISBN 978-8-81200032-6.
- Wallmeyer, Gion (2019). "With Pen and Sword: Knights as Crusade Advisors between the 12th and the 14th Century". Francia. 46: 453–468.
- Williams, Steven J. (2000). "Philip of Tripoli's Translation of the Pseudo-Aristotelian Secretum secretorum Viewed Within the Context of Intellectual Activity in the Crusader Levant". In B. van den Abeele; A. Tihon; I. Draelants (eds.). Occident et Proche-Orient: contacts scientifiques au temps des Croisades. Reminisciences. Vol. 5. Brepols. pp. 79–94. doi:10.1484/m.rem-eb.3.935. ISBN 978-2-503-51116-0.
