= García de Ayerbe =

Aragonese nobleman and cleric

Initial from the start of García's crusade proposal in a contemporary manuscript

García Miguel de Ayerbe (Note: Latin: Garsias Michaelis de Ayerbe. His first name is sometimes spelled Garcias and his last name d'Ayerbe (or Ayerve).) (died 4 September 1332) was an Aragonese nobleman and cleric who served as the bishop of León from April 1318 until his death. In the 1320s, he wrote a proposal for a new crusade to recover the Holy Land.

== Life ==
Little is known of García's early life. He was a native of Aragon and his father's name was Miguel, but it is not known with certainty to which of two noble families associated with Ayerbe he belonged. (Note: The older family, of knightly rank, is the more likely. It originated in the 12th century. Pablo Ordás Díaz suggests that García may have been the son of Miguel Jiménez de Ayerbe, archdeacon and dean of the cathedral of Toledo from 1281 to 1299. If this is correct, then the bishop was a relative of the contemporary justice of Aragon, Sancho Jiménez de Ayerbe. The other lineage of Ayerbe was of royal rank, descended from Pedro de Ayerbe, an illegitimate son of King James I. No source, however, suggests that García was related to royalty.) Before coming to León, he was a canon and sacristan of the cathedral of Zaragoza. He later served as camerarius of Tarragona.

In April 1318, García was elected bishop of León, ending a 16-month vacancy. (Note: The vacancy began with the sudden death of Bishop Juan Fernández in December 1316. The see was still vacant on 3 April 1318, but by 18 April García was bishop. This is according to documents in the cathedral archives, the Colección documental del Archivo de la Catedral de León. A document in the Vatican Apostolic Archive dated 6 November 1317 already has García as bishop.) In October, he reopened a century-old dispute by attempting to assert episcopal authority over the abbey of Sahagún, which claimed exemption. In 1322, he appealed to the papal legate Cardinal Guillaume de Pierre Godin for the return of certain lands held by the abbey. The dispute, however, was not resolved until Pope John XXII found in the bishop's favour in 1328. Disputed economic rights in six villages were only finally settled by arbitration before the abbot of San Isidoro in 1330. The two parties then signed an accord that permanently settled the dispute. In 1319, García defaulted on a debt to a merchant despite having sworn an oath and was threatened with excommunication.

In 1320, the cloisters of the cathedral were burnt during a confrontation between factions following the death of the regents Pedro de Castilla and Juan el de Tarifa the previous year. (Note: According to the Crónica de Alfonso XI, when Felipe de Castilla entered the city, the citizens retreated to the cathedral, where they burnt the cloisters and some of the bishop's houses. Surrounded, they changed their chant from "León, León for Don Juan!' to "Haro, Haro for Don Juan!", as if merely expressing their desire to see his claim to the lordship of Biscay vindicated. They were ultimately allowed to leave in peace and Felipe garrisoned the city.) The city of León had supported Juan for the throne in 1296 and García seems to have been close to his son, Juan el Tuerto. There is a suggestion in the Crónica de Alfonso XI that García was considered a suspect foreigner in the royal court. (Note: The Crónica states erroneously that García was a Frenchman, like John XXII a native of the Quercy, which can be explained by the connotations of Frenchness among Castilians of the time.) The earliest royal act to mention García is dated 16 September 1322 and confers on the bishop some privileges conferred on the bishops of León by previous monarchs. As King Alfonso XI was a minor, the grant was actually drawn up by Juan el Tuerto in the king's name. While García left the reconstruction of the cloisters to the canons, beginning in 1324 he took a leading role in the construction of a new wall around the precinct that had grown up outside the old Roman walls of León.

In October 1326, the diocese of León was assessed for a payment of 55,883 maravedíes. In February 1327, García remitted 33,350 and the account was considered paid. That same month, Alfonso XI ordered him to hand over the castles of Mesmino and Peña Morquera or face charges of treason. He did not attend the king's major cortes in this period. His nephew, Miguel Bertrán de Ayerbe, died on 10 November 1328 while visiting García in León and was buried in the cathedral there. (Note: His tomb effigy, depicting him as a knight, and his contemporary epitaph survive. He fought for King Robert of Naples in Italy and for Prince Alfonso (later Alfonso IV of Aragon) in the Aragonese conquest of Sardinia in 1323–1324. He left 1,000 maravedíes to the cathedral for the celebration of his anniversary. His epitaph confirms that García was an Aragonese and a noble.)

In 1329, García began a programme of copying documents confirming León's royal exemptions. In at least one case—a privilege of Sancho IV—the original document had been destroyed in the fire of 1320. In August 1332, Alfonso XI confirmed all his predecessors acts in favour of León. A month later, on 4 September, García died, as recorded in the necrologies of both Zaragoza and León.

== Works ==
Between 1323 and 1328, García wrote a treatise in Latin proposing a new crusade to recover the Holy Land for Christendom. (Note: The bishop of León (espicopi Legionen) is identified as the author of this work by the table of contents of manuscript BnF lat. 7470. The bishop at the time of both the manuscript's commission and the probable date of the work was García. The work is dated on internal grounds to the reign of Charles IV because the author remarks that there were no French royal princesses for Alfonso XI to marry. This identification is widely accepted. It has, however, been challenged. Christopher Tyerman argues that the contents better fit the period 1312–1314, when France and Navarre had separate kings. The bishops of León in that period were Gonzalo de Hinojosa and Juan Soares.) It is unclear what motivated him to write or, if he was commissioned, by whom. The work was probably intended for King Charles IV of France. It was translated into Old French. Its short title is Informacio. (Note: Its full title in the Glasgow manuscript is Informacio alia de pertinentibus ad passagium et primo agitur de domino rege lerosolimitani et de passagiis hactenus factis et per quos et per quas partes et quid ibi profecerint. In Paris 7470, domino rege becomes dominio regis. Felicitas Schmieder gives the title as Informacio de pertinentibus ad passagium.) Three manuscript copies exist:

- Paris, Bibliothèque nationale de France, MS lat. 7470, folios 123v–129v, a contemporary Latin copy from the reign of Charles IV
- Paris, Bibliothèque Sainte-Geneviève, MS 1654, folios 151–162, an Old French copy with numerous scribal errors, probably made for Charles IV (Note: This codex also contains a Hospitaller crusade proposal from 1306–1307, the Devise des chemins de Babiloine, the crusade proposal of Guillaume Durand the Younger, the De statu sarracenorum of William of Tripoli and a short historical description of the Muslim conquest of Sicily and Majorca.)
- Glasgow, University Library, Gen. 6, folios 129r–138v, a copy of Paris 7470, made perhaps while the latter was in the possession of Jean le Bègue

García begins his proposal with a brief account of the history of the crusades. He considers the legendary campaign of Charlemagne in the Holy Land to be the first crusade. He recounts the First Crusade, Second Crusade, Seventh Crusade and the Lord Edward's crusade. He stresses the supposed treachery of the Byzantines. His plan demanded peace between France, Aragon, Castile and Sicily, to be achieved through marriage alliances. He recommended a marriage between Alfonso XI and Joan of Navarre. (Note: According to Leopold, he recommended that "the king of Navarre's daughter marry the young King Alfonso XI … as there were no French princesses available".) His Spanish perspective is apparent when he argues for raising 2,000 troops from Spain and Gascony. In the first stage of his proposed expedition, an army of mercenaries in galleys would establish a foothold in the mountains of Syria. If repulsed, they would retreat to Rhodes and Cyprus. Only after this would actual crusaders proceed to the Holy Land as reinforcements. (Note: García's belief in the value of an initial mercenary strike was shared by Marino Sanudo Torsello.) Wood for building could be shipped in from Rhodes and Cyprus.

García envisages crusaders travelling both overland and by sea. One of the values of the overland route was that it would allow the Byzantine empire, which he believed would ally with the Anatolian Turks against the crusaders, to be conquered. He expresses hope that the Ilkhanate would prevent the Turks from coming to their ally's aid. He correctly perceived that the Ilkhanate was a potential ally only because of its greater animosity towards the Mamluks. (Note: García's late hope for a Ilkhanid alliance was shared by the author of the Directorium ad faciendum passagium.) He is unaware, however, that the Ilkhanids and Mamluks had signed a peace treaty in 1323. Most unrealistically, he estimates that it would take a year for the crusaders and their allies to defeat both the Byzantines and Turks. As for the maritime side, García recommends the fleets to stop frequently to allow men and animals to rest onshore and urges the king to practice swimming. He evidently had little experience of or confidence in sea travel.

Besides the crusade treatise, García wrote an Ecclesiastical Constitution for his diocese in 1319 and a letter dated 18 March 1324.

== Bibliography ==
- Agúndez San Miguel, Leticia (2016). "Conflicto jurisdiccional y competencia escrituraria entre la catedral de León y el monasterio de Sahagún: la elaboración de Becerros en el siglo XIII". Hispania Sacra. 68 (138): 521–531. doi:10.3989/hs.2016.033. hdl:10902/25297.
- Allmand, Christopher (2011). The De Re Militari of Vegetius: The Reception, Transmission and Legacy of a Roman Text in the Middle Ages. Cambridge University Press.
- Arranz Guzmán, Ana (2018). "Obispos y clérigos extranjeros en Castilla durante el papado de Aviñón: ¿tema de preocupación ciudadana o creación de opinión pública por la monarquía?". In Isabel Beceiro Pita (ed.). La espiritualidad y la configuración de los reinos ibéricos (Siglos XII–XV). Dykinson. pp. 151–195.
- Broto Aparicio, Santiago (2005). "Los Ayerbe: un linaje altoaragonés" (PDF). Hidalguía. 308: 121–144.
- Delaville Le Roulx, Joseph (1885). La France en Orient au XIV^{e} siècle: expéditions du maréchal Boucicaut. Paris: Ernest Thorin.
- Goñi Gaztambide, José (1966). "Juan XXII y la provisión de los obispados españoles". Archivum Historiae Pontificiae. 4: 25–58. JSTOR 23563513.
- Geanakoplos, Deno (1975). "Byzantium and the Crusades, 1261–1354". In Setton, Kenneth M.; Hazard, Harry W. (eds.). A History of the Crusades, Volume III: The Fourteenth and Fifteenth Centuries. Madison and London: University of Wisconsin Press. pp. 27–68. ISBN 0-299-06670-3.
- Jackson, Peter (2005). The Mongols and the West, 1221–1410. Routledge.
- Leopold, Antony (2000). How to Recover the Holy Land: The Crusade Proposals of the Late Thirteenth and Early Fourteenth Centuries. Ashgate. ISBN 9780754601203.
- Linehan, Peter (1993). History and the Historians of Medieval Spain. Clarendon Press.
- Miranda Pérez-Seoane, Julia; González García, José Manuel (1997). "Mesmino y Peña Morquera: dos castillos del Alto Curueño". Tierras de León. 36 (103): 1–20.
- Ordás Díaz, Pablo (2017). "¿Don Gonzalo Osorio de Villalobos o don Gonzalo de Hinojosa? Un episcopado olvidado en León, 1301–1313". E-Spania. 26.
- Ordás Díaz, Pablo (2018). "El episcopado de don García Miguel de Ayerbe y el conflictivo período de las tutorías de Alfonso XI para la catedral de León (1318–1332)". En la España Medieval. 41: 257–275. doi:10.5209/ELEM.60011. hdl:10347/19923.
- Posadilla, Juan de Dios (1899). Episcopologio legionense: biografía de los obispos de León. Vol. 2. León.
- Reeve, Michael D. (2000). "The Transmission of Vegetius's Epitoma rei militaris". Aevum. 74 (Fasc. 1): 243–354. JSTOR 20861051.
- Rouse, Richard; Rouse, Mary (2006). "Context and Reception: A Crusading Collection for Charles IV of France". In Keith Busby; Christopher Kleinhenz (eds.). Courtly Arts and the Art of Courtliness. D. S. Brewer. pp. 105–178.
- Schmieder, Felicitas (1994). Europa und die Fremden: die Mongolen im Urteil des Abendlandes vom 13. bis in das 15. Jahrhundert. J. Thorbecke.
- Stuckey, Jace (2021). "Imagined Crusades: The Legend of Charlemagne and the East". In Jace Stuckey (ed.). The Legend of Charlemagne: Envisioning Empire in the Middle Ages. Brill. pp. 32–61. doi:10.1163/9789004467774_004. ISBN 9789004467774. S2CID 239909655.
- Tyerman, Christopher (2001). "Review of Leopold 2000". The International History Review. 23 (4): 886–888. JSTOR 40108846.
