= Piloti (disambiguation) =

A piloti is a column or pillar that lifts a building above ground or water.

Piloti may also refer to:

- Piloti (band), a Yugoslav rock band
- Piloti (TV series), an Italian television series
- Emanuele Piloti, 15th-century Cretan merchant and writer
- Piloti, pseudonym of the architecture critic Gavin Stamp
