= Giovanni Dominelli =

Italian priest (fl. 1609)

Giovanni Dominelli was an Italian priest resident in Cairo who wrote in Italian a proposal for a crusade to recover the Holy Land in 1609. It survives in a single manuscript, either the author's original or a contemporary copy, in Munich, Bavarian State Library, K. schw. 490/32. It is fourteen folios in length. It is addressed to King Philip III of Spain, who also held lands in Italy.

Dominelli's proposal is dated 20 November 1609. He was writing at a time when the Emir Fakhr al-Din II was still in revolt against the Ottoman sultan. In 1607, Grand Duke Ferdinand I of Tuscany had landed troops on Cyprus in hopes of meeting a Greek uprising before joining Fakhr al-Din and his ally, Ali Janbulad. The Tuscans had been poorly prepared, the Greek uprising had not materialized and Janbulad was defeated in October. Ferdinand died in February 1609, but his successor, Cosimo II, renewed the alliance with Fakhr al-Din. The sultan, meanwhile, was still at war with the Persians and dealing with unrest on his Transylvanian border that threatened break out into war at any moment. These events spurred Dominelli's hopes for a new crusade.

Dominelli proposed multiple strikes on Constantinople, Karamania, the Archipelago, Rhodes and Alexandria. He noted that Alexandria had a garrison of only 200 men and in Egypt the entire army consisted of 4,000 men. He thought that the Greeks would rise up if Constantinople were attacked and he expected the Maronites to support Fakhr al-Din's rebellion and give assistance to the crusaders once they arrived. Although Dominelli was a cleric writing at a time when the crusades were a thing of the past, Sylvia Schein classes his proposal among the secular and practical because informed by his personal experience and knowledge of the East.

== Bibliography ==
- Atiya, Aziz Suryal (1938). The Crusade in the Later Middle Ages. Methuen.
- Jorga, Nicolae (1894). "Un Projet relatif a la conquête de Jerusalem (1609)". Revue de l'Orient latin. 2: 183–189.
- Schein, Sylvia (2006). "Recovery of the Holy Land". In Alan V. Murray (ed.). The Crusades: An Encyclopedia. Vol. 4: Q–Z. ABC-CLIO. pp. 1019–1021.
