= Directorium ad faciendum passagium transmarinum =

Crusader treatise

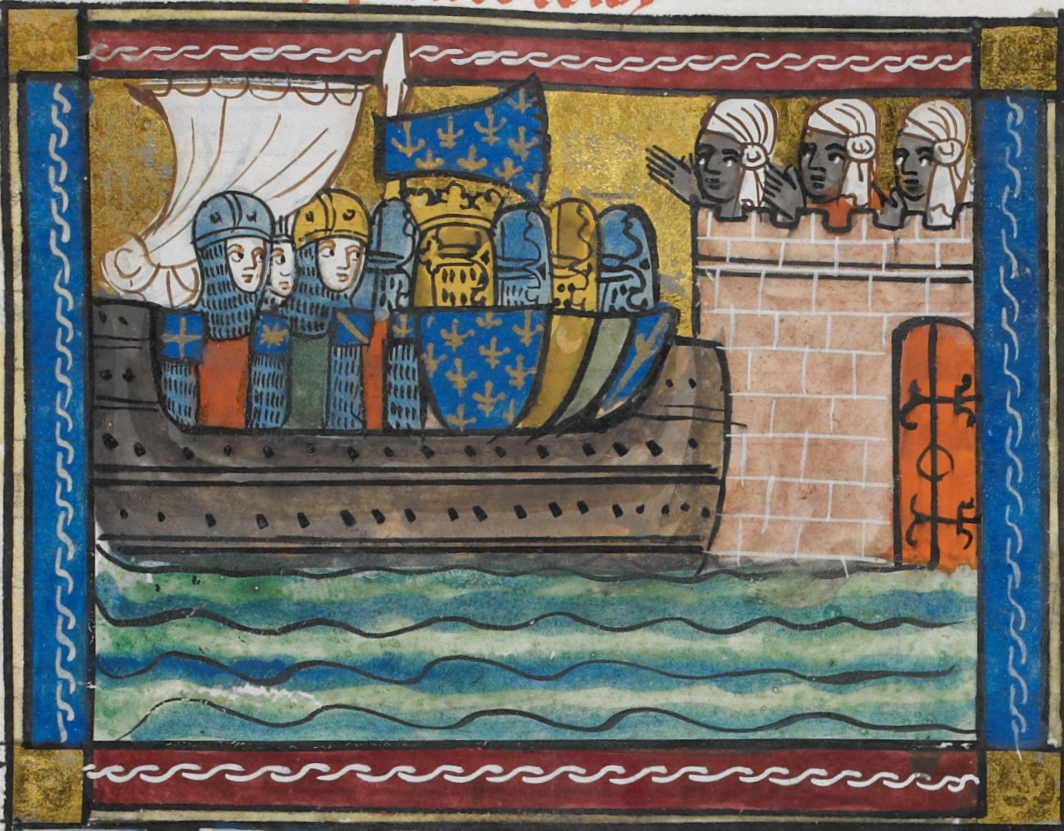
An illustration depicting the king of France leading a crusade, from a copy of Jean de Vignay's translation made before 1340

The Directorium ad faciendum passagium transmarinum (or Directorium ad passagium for short) is an anonymous 24,000-word Latin treatise on crusading submitted to King Philip VI of France on 26 July 1330 or 1332. The treatise proposes the conquest of the Holy Land, the Byzantine Empire and Russia and their subjection to the Catholic Church; outlines how this might be achieved; and describes how the conquered territories could be administered.

Two French translations were produced, one by Jean de Vignay in 1333 and another by Jean Miélot in 1455. Both are transmitted in richly illustrated manuscripts. There are a total of 15 surviving manuscripts in Latin or French. The authorship of the treatise has been a matter of much speculation.

== Manuscripts ==
The author presenting his work to Philip VI, from an illustrated copy of Jean Miélot's translation

There are nine known extant manuscripts of the Latin text:

- Brussels, Bibliothèque royale de Belgique, 9176 (14th century)
- Paris, Bibliothèque nationale de France, lat. 5990, ff. 34–55 (14th century)
- Basel, Öffentliche Bibliothek der Universität, A. I. 28, ff. 254v–291v (15th century)
- Oxford, Magdalen College Library, 43, ff. 1–24 (15th century)
- Vatican, Biblioteca Apostolica Vaticana, Pal. lat. 603, ff. 73–133v (15th century)
- Paris, Bibliothèque nationale de France, lat. 5138, ff. 1–39 (17th century)
- London, British Library, Harley 3995
- El Escorial, Real Biblioteca del Monasterio de San Lorenzo, O-III-34, starting at f. 32v
- Vienna, Österreichische Nationalbibliothek, lat. 536

Jean de Vignay's translation survives in a single known manuscript:

- London, British Library, Royal 19 D I, ff. 165v–192v
- The 1423 catalogue of the library of the Louvre indicates that it possessed a copy, but it has since been lost.

Jean Miélot's translation survives in at least four known manuscripts:

- Brussels, Bibliothèque royale de Belgique, 9095
- Paris, Bibliothèque nationale de France, Arsenal, 4798, starting at f. 1
- Paris, Bibliothèque nationale de France, fr. 5593, ff. 6–67
- Paris, Bibliothèque nationale de France, fr. 9087, starting at f. 1

== Author ==
The author of the Directorium is unknown. The French royal register gives him only as "a wise prelate, formerly a Dominican, and now an archbishop in the empire of Constantinople." In the treatise he claims to have traveled far and wide and lived as a missionary in Persia. He visited Constantinople, Socotra and claims to have traveled south as far as Madagascar. His account of Russia suggests first-hand knowledge. He may have been involved in the union of the church of Cilician Armenia with Rome.

The text may have been anonymous from the start. Charles Köhler, who edited the text, presumed that even the king of France did not know the name of the author. It was not known to Jean de Vignay, who translated it in 1333. An early tradition ascribes the Directorium to a monk named Burcard or Brochard (Brocardus monacus), usually identified with Burchard of Mount Sion. This is untenable, but was propagated by the French translation of Jean Miélot, which attributes it to Brochard l'Allemand. Köhler therefore refers to the author as Pseudo-Brocardus. He tentatively suggests that its author was William of Adam, but this has been disputed. The modern conjecture that its author was John of Cori, archbishop in Persia, is also unsatisfactory.

== Synopsis ==
The Directorium is divided into two books and twelve parts, corresponding to the "two swords" and the Twelve Apostles. The first book is four times as long as the second and contains eight of the twelve parts. The author begins by praising Philip VI for his intention to lead a crusade. Since he can furnish neither military nor financial aid, he offers the Directorium instead. It is based, he says, on his personal experiences after living 24 years in infidel lands. The following is a synopsis of the twelve parts:

The projected crusade, as depicted in an illustrated copy of Jean Miélot's translation

=== Part 1 ===
The first part enumerates the four reasons or motives for undertaking a crusade:

1. First, there is the example of Philip's illustrious predecessors, who chased the Muslims from Aquitaine, Provence, Spain and the Holy Land.
2. Second, there is the duty of Christian monarch to expand the boundaries of Christendom. These have shrunk considerably on account of heresy and the spread of Islam. In fact, true Christians (that is, Catholics) are reduced to just a fraction of Europe or about one twentieth of the inhabited world. The author stresses that Asia is larger than supposed and claims to have travelled as a missionary as far as the 24th parallel south. He also describes the non-Catholic countries of Europe in some detail: to cross Russia (which borders Bohemia and Poland) is a forty days' march and Bulgaria another twenty. From his description of Russia, it appears that he had spent some time in the lands north of the Black Sea. Nevertheless, Catholic Europe exceeds the other parts of the world in martial skill, in virtue and manners, in the wise use of its riches and in its good government.
3. Third, there is compassion for suffering Christians and those brought low by the errors of the Greeks. Of these, the author lists the following peoples north of the Black Sea and the Caucasus: Goths, Ziqui, Avogasi, Georgians, Alans and the tribes from which the Huns of Attila were descended. The territories of all of these took 80 days to cross. He also mentions the Christians subject to the emperor of Persia, namely, the Trapezuntines, Armenians, Jacobites and Nestorians. He notes that Noah's Ark came to rest in Armenia. Finally, he mentions the Christians of East Africa. He claims to have visited an island in the Indian Ocean—most likely Socotra—where the natives practised baptism and circumcision. He considers Ethiopia a powerful nation and relishes the fact that Nubia—which he treats as a part of the Ethiopian nation—had at times defeated the sultan of Egypt. He records a Nubian prophecy that they would one day destroy the Egyptians and the Arabs, sack Mecca and burn the body of Muḥammad.
4. Fourth is the devotional motive: the natural desire of a Christian to see the lands and places hallowed by Jesus' presence. This passage is of no historical or geographical value.

=== Part 2 ===
The second part enumerates the five preambles (preparations or prerequisites) that must precede the crusade:

1. The first preamble is prayer and invocation of divine aid.
2. The second is more virtuous living. The fall of Jerusalem in 1187 is blamed on sin. The Latin clergy in the Holy Land are singled out for vanity, greed, indiscipline and indolence. References to the military treatises of Vegetius and Valerius Maximus are worked in at this point.
3. The third is concord among the Christian powers. The especially important given that the preeminent naval powers of Christendom, Aragon and Genoa, were then at war. Also at war were Naples and Sicily, the produce and ports of which were the so valuable for provisioning a crusade. Philip VI is urged to use his influence to bring Alfonso IV of Aragon, Robert of Naples and Frederick III of Sicily to peace terms. The author knows from personal experience that Frederick III is devoted to the crusade and an excellent military leader.
4. The fourth is military supplies: siege engines (balistae), tools for mining fortifications and warships. The value of Genoa and Venice to the crusade is stressed, especially the strategic Genoese colonies of Caffa and Pera.
5. The fifth is a permanent fleet in the eastern Mediterranean to interdict all trade between Europe and Egypt and to prevent Egypt from sending or receiving naval assistance. Like Marino Sanudo in his Liber secretorum fidelium crucis (1307), the author believes that Egypt is dependent for its military strength on imports of weapons, iron and timber and will quickly succumb to a blockade.

=== Part 3 ===
The third part concerns four possible routes for the crusade. The first two are discussed and rejected.

1. The first route discussed is that proposed by Ramon Llull: the overland route through north Africa. This is rejected for being too long and including a stretch of complete desert. Moreover, after traversing most of the way (and the desert), the crusaders would have to first defeat the most powerful Muslim ruler, the sultan of Egypt, before reaching the Holy Land. The Eighth Crusade, led by Louis IX of France, which attacked Tunis, is dismissed as a crusade of opportunity.
2. The second route is the sea route from a French port (Aigues-Mortes, Marseille or Nice) with a stopover in Cyprus. Sea travel is described "prison, with the additional chance of being drowned". The author has evidently not enjoyed his travels by sea. Overall, he considers it too expensive and risky for a whole army. The absence of any Catholic harbour in the Holy Land also makes it impractical.
3. The third route is through Italy. There were three possibilities, all resulting in the army crossing Vlachia and gathering at Thessalonica: the route through Aquileia and Dalmatia and the two routes down Italy crossing the Adriatic either at Brindisi (then through Corfu and Albania) or at Otranto (then through Epirus). The Catholicism of the Albanians is stressed and the military weakness of the non-Catholics along these routes.
4. The fourth route is the overland route through Germany and Hungary, which was Catholic as far as Serbia (Rassia) and Bulgaria. This is the author's preferred route. He believes that Charlemagne took this route to liberate the Holy Land, although this is a legend.

=== Part 4 ===
The fourth part is an extended discussion of the selected routes. Allowance is made for Provençal and Italian contingents to go by way of Italy or the sea (but not by Africa). Adequate preparations for the Adriatic crossing should be made in advance. The king of France should go overland and force his way through Bulgaria.

=== Part 5 ===
The fifth part discusses the possibility of negotiating treaties with the Christian but non-Catholic rulers of Byzantium and Serbia. Here the Greeks are treated as the fathers of all heresies (including Arianism), who led the other eastern peoples astray and who have continuously betrayed and maltreated Catholics. The Fourth Crusade (1202–1204) and the sack of Constantinople are treated as just acts. Michael VIII Palaiologos is called a usurper and accused of massacring the Catholics in Constantinople in 1261. The author refers to a recent chronicle of the rulers of Serbia to accuse of them gross misdeeds. His conclusions is that an invasion of the Byzantine Empire and Serbia would be a just war to re-establish the Latin Empire.

=== Part 6 ===
The sixth part discusses the ease of conquering Byzantium. He claims to have witnessed the deposition of Emperor Andronikos II in 1328. The same emperor was defeated by the Catalan Company near Adrianople. The emperor under the heirs of Palaiologos was surrounded by enemies and incapable of defending itself. The author himself claims never to have visited a country where he did not see Greek slaves. Persia alone had over 400,000, all forced to abandon their Christian faith. The reigning emperor, Andronikos III, was a fool who paid tribute to the Catalans, the Tatars and the Turks. Moreover, the so-called Ecumenical Patriarchate was subject to such a fool. The Greeks were pusillanimous, effeminate, licentious and vain. Conquering their empire would not be difficult.

=== Part 7 ===
The seventh part is a detailed discussion of how to besiege Constantinople. The city was large but its population small. A landward assault should be made against the Golden Gate, assisted by a naval assault. Battering rams and scaling materials would be required, and the ships should be fitted for siege engines. The author suggests the use of covered ships called barbotae and siege engines called uxeria. These included rams with pointed iron caps suspended from ropes so they could be swung against gates. He outlines a means of putting 500 men on the wall at once through "castles" on the ships. He claims to have seen this method employed successfully against the Turks by Martino Zaccaria, several of whose victories he witnessed. He expects that Constantinople could be taken in one day. Afterwards, Thessalonica and Adrianople would not resist long.

=== Part 8 ===
The eight part, concluding the first book, outlines the administration of the conquered lands. It also treats the neglected topic of conquering Serbia in a sort of appendix.

1. Catholics who abandoned their faith and the Calogeri (Greek monks) were to be banished. The people were to turn to the Catholic Church, and in exchange the restored Latin Emperor would remit their taxes. Education in Latin and the Inquisition were to be introduced to root out Greek heresy. The author presents a very detailed account of Greek conventicles, private chapels and oratories, which were to be suppressed as dens of conspiracy.
2. Serbia lacked wall cities. It also possessed a substantial Catholic population—Latins in the cities of Antivari, Dulcigno and Scutari and the Albanians—that would readily side with Catholic invaders. The author estimates that only 1,000 knights and 5,000–6,000 infantry would be needed to conquer it. He describes the Serbian territory as a beautiful and fertile land abounding in mineral wealth.

=== Part 9 ===
The second book begins, in the ninth part, with a discussion of the various eastern peoples. The most untrustworthy were the Armenians—with the partial exception of the Uniates of Cilicia. The author himself was one of two Dominicans tasked by Pope John XXII with bringing about their union with Rome in 1318. He claims that this union was brought about more by fear than love. After the Armenians come the Gasinuli (of mixed Latin and Greek parentage), the Syrians (i.e., Jacobites), the Murtati (of mixed Turkish and Greek parentage) and converts from Islam (who are called "baptized neophytes"). The author has a low opinion of all of them. They are, however, all useful to the crusade and Philip should use every stratagem and indulgence to win them over. The Assassins, of whom the author has heard but never seen, should not be admitted to the king's presence.

=== Part 10 ===
The tenth part (second of the second book) is devoted to the advantages of going through Turkish Anatolia rather than Egypt. The idea of sailing to Cilician Armenia is rejected on account of the poor port facilities. Only the Portus Palorum is mentioned, the port of Laiazzo being ignored. In attacking the Turks, the crusaders need not fear the Egyptians, since they would not dare open up Syria to attack from Persia. The author reminds his readers that the Persian khan Ghazan, expecting help from the West, had invaded Syria in 1299–1300, capturing Damascus.

=== Part 11 ===
The eleventh part (third of the second book) describes the places which the crusade would use as centres of supply and revictualling. In Thrace, there was a grain emporium at Rodosto and one for wine at Ganos. The most important city in Macedonia was Thessalonica, which had grain and vegetables. The Lordship of Negroponte and the Catalan Duchy of Athens had wine, oil and cheese. The author points out that the land known in the Bible as Asia Minor and to the Greek as Anatolia had come to be known as Turkey (Turquia). Its northern shore had plenty of grain, meat, fish, honey and wax.

=== Part 12 ===
The twelfth part (fourth of the second book) gives six reasons for expecting a quick victory over the Turks.

1. God would tolerate their wickedness no longer.
2. They were divided into numerous independent beyliks.
3. They were much weaker than in the past.
4. They depended for their military strength on mercenaries and slaves of Christian origin, the latter ever ready to rise up if given the opportunity.
5. Their military equipment left much to be desired. Their horses were small and weak. They wore little armour and their weaponry was inadequate. They were capable of fighting only by ambushes and feigned retreats.
6. They believed in a prophecy that foretold their defeat by a lord of the Franks. In this connection, the author reports how terror spread throughout Persia in 1308 after Pope Clement V had proclaimed a new crusade.

== Historical interest ==
There is much of historical interest in the Directorium. For example, it records that "the Albanians indeed have a language quite different from Latin, however they use Latin letters in all their books", which has been taken to imply that Albanian was already a written language by the 14th century. It may, however, merely indicate that whatever literature circulated in Albania was in Latin.

== Old French translations ==
Jean de Vignay made an Old French translation, Le Directoire pour faire le passage de la Terre Sainte, for Philip VI in 1333. If he wrote a prologue, it has been lost. The translation was almost certainly commissioned by the king, who probably could not read Latin. That it was made in haste is apparent from its sloppiness and literalness compared to Vignay's other works. The sole surviving manuscript of this translation is a copy and not the original presented to the king. The copyist mistakenly inserted a line from the Travels of Marco Polo.

Jean Miélot also made a French translation, L'Advis directif pour faire le passage d'oultremer, in 1455 for Duke Philip the Good of Burgundy. It is a superior translation, literal but elegant. Miélot did not make use of Vignay's work.

== Editions ==
The French translation of Jean Miélot was the first version to be printed in 1846. The first edition of the Latin translation, printed side-by-side with Miélot's translation, was printed in 1906. An edition based exclusively on BnF lat. 5138 was published the following year.

== Bibliography ==
- Abd-Elrazak, Loula; Colombo Timelli, Maria (2020). Brun, Laurent (ed.). "Jean Miélot". Archives de Littérature du Moyen Âge.
- Beazley, C. R. (1907a). "Directorium ad Faciendum Passagium Transmarinum". The American Historical Review. 12 (4): 810–857. doi:10.2307/1839189. hdl:2027/mdp.39015068338931. JSTOR 1839189.
- Beazley, C. R. (1907b). "Directorium ad Faciendum Passagium Transmarinum, II". The American Historical Review. 13 (1): 66–115. doi:10.2307/1834887. JSTOR 1834887.
- Brun, Laurent (2016). "Directorium ad passagium faciendum". Archives de Littérature du Moyen Âge.
- Elsie, Robert (2003). Early Albania: A Reader of Historical Texts, 11th–17th Centuries. Otto Harrassowitz.
- Knowles, Christine M. (1953). The Life and Work of Jean de Vignay (PhD dissertation). Birkbeck College, University of London.
- Knowles, Christine M. (1954). "Jean de Vignay, un traducteur du XIVe siècle". Romania. 75 (299): 353–383. doi:10.3406/roma.1954.3419.
- Köhler, Charles, ed. (1906). "[Pseudo-]Brocardus, Directorium ad passagium faciendum". Recueil des historiens des croisades. Vol. Documents arméniens, Vol. 2. Paris: Imprimerie nationale. pp. CXLIII–CLXXVI (introduction), 367–517 (text).
- Leopold, Antony R. (2000a). How to Recover the Holy Land: The Crusade Proposals of the Late Thirteenth and Early Fourteenth Centuries. Ashgate.
- Reiffenberg, Frédéric de, ed. (1846). Monuments pour servir à l'histoire des provinces de Namur, de Hainaut et de Luxembourg. Vol. IV. Brussels.
