= Guibert of Tournai =

French Franciscan friar (c. 1200 – 1284)

Guibert of Tournai (Latin: Guibertus or Gilbertus Tournacensis; c. 1200 – 1284) was a French Franciscan friar, known for his sermons and other writings.

== Life ==
Guibert was born near Tournai around 1200. He attended the University of Paris where he became a master. In 1240, he joined the Franciscan order. A student and collaborator of Bonaventure, he held the Franciscan chair of theology between 1259 and 1261. Guibert was also connected to the court of Louis IX; he may even have accompanied Louis on his first crusade to Egypt and the Holy Land (1248–1254), although this is uncertain. He participated along with Bonaventure in the Council of Lyon in 1274. He died in 1284.

== Sermons ==
Guibert wrote several popular collections of sermons, including one of Sermones domincales et de sanctis (sermons for each Sunday and holy day of the year) and one of Sermones ad varios status (sermons addressed to different audiences for different occasions). Particular audiences mentioned in this latter collection include scholars, monks, the poor, lepers, pilgrims, servants, and children.

== Other writings ==
Guibert also wrote a number of pedagogical, theological, and hagiographical works, including:

- Erudimentum doctrinae
- De modo addiscendi ('On the Method of Learning') written for John de Dampierre, provost of Bruges, son of Guy of Flanders.
- Eruditio regum et principum, written for Louis IX in 1259
- De officio episcopali et ecclesiae caeremoniis
- Vita Sancti Eleutherii (hagiographical work)
- Tractatus de pace et tranquillitate animi ('Treatise on the Peace and Tranquility of the Soul')
- Tractatus de virginitate, dedicated to Louis IX's sister Isabelle in 1270
- De morte non timenda ('On Not Fearing Death')
- Collectio de scandalis ecclesiae, written for the Second Council of Lyon (1274) after an appeal for advice concerning the recovery of the Holy Land

== Sources ==
=== Digitised manuscripts ===
- Sermones [ad status], Bibliothèque nationale de France Latin 15943, on Gallica

=== Early printed editions ===
- Sermones ad omnes status (Lyon, 1511) Google Books

=== Modern critical editions ===
- Le traité Eruditio regum et principum de Guibert de Tournai: étude critique et texte inédit, ed. A. de Poorter (Louvain, 1914).
- De modo addiscendi, ed. E. Bonifacio (Torino, 1953).
- De morte, De septem verbis Domini in cruce, ed. C. Munier, CCCM 242 (Turnhout, 2011).

=== Secondary sources ===
- Casagrande, Carla. ‘Le roi, les anges et la paix chez le franciscain Guibert de Tournai’, in Prêcher la paix et discipliner la société: Italie, France, Angleterre (XIIIe-XVe siècles), ed. Rosa Maria Dessi (Turnhout, 2005).
- Davis, Adam J. ‘Preaching in Thirteenth-Century Hospitals’, Journal of Medieval History 36, no. 1 (2010).
- D'Avray, David, and M. Tausche, ‘Marriage Sermons in "Ad Status" Collections of the Central Middle Ages’, Archives d'histoire doctrinale et littéraire du Moyen Âge 47 (1981).
- D'Avray, David. Medieval Marriage Sermons (2001).
- Friday, Hal. 'The "Vidi Alterum Angelum" Topos in Two Sermons by Guibert of Tournai for the Feast of St. Francis.' Franciscan Studies 70 (2012): 101–38.
