= Raymond Beazley =

British historian (1868–1955)

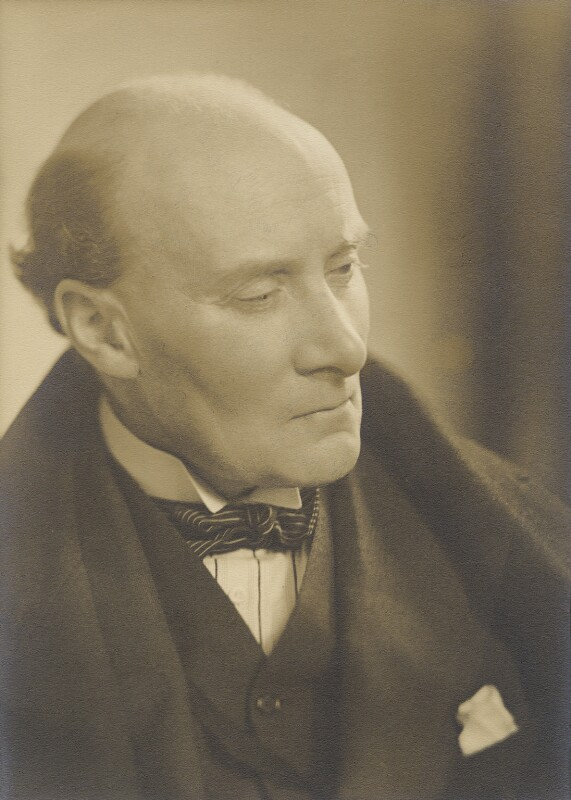
Charles Raymond Beazley, c. 1910

Sir Charles Raymond Beazley (3 April 1868 – 1 February 1955) was a British historian. He was professor of history at the University of Birmingham from 1909 to 1933.

Born in Blackheath, he was the son of Rev. Joseph and Louisa Beazley. He was educated at St Paul's School, King's College London and Balliol College, Oxford. His academic career was as a Fellow of Merton College, Oxford, until his chair at Birmingham.

Associated with a pro-German tendency within the British political and intellectual establishment in the inter-war years, Beazley was a regular contributor to the Anglo-German Review, established in 1936. He subsequently sat on the National Council of the Link, a pro-German organisation.

== Works ==
- James of Aragon (1890)
- Henry the Navigator (1895)
- The Dawn of Modern Geography (vol. 1, 1897; vol. 2, 1901; vol. 3, 1906)
- John and Sebastian Cabot (1898)
- The Chronicle of the Discovery and Conquest of Guinea. Written by Gomes Eannes de Azurara (1899) translator with Edgar Prestage
- An English Garner: Voyages and Travels mainly during the 16th and 17th Centuries (1902) two volumes
- Voyages of the Elizabethan Seamen. Select Narratives from the Principal Navigations of Hakluyt (1907) edited with Edward John Payne
- (trans.) "Directorium ad faciendum passagium transmarinum" I and II, in American Historical Review (1907)
- A Note-book of Mediaeval History AD323–AD1453 (1917)
- Russia From The Varangians To The Bolsheviks (1918) with Nevill Forbes and G. A. Birkett
- Nineteenth Century Europe (1922)
- The Road to Ruin in Europe (1932)
- The Beauty of the North Cotswolds (1946)
