= Galvano da Levanto =

Galvano is saved from the Devil and the fires of Hell by an angel in this illustration from Paris 3181.

Galvano da Levanto or Galvanus de Levanto (fl. c. 1300) was a Genoese physician and writer. Devoutly religious, he may have joined the Third Order of Saint Francis. Having suffered medical and financial problems, he sought the patronage of King Philip IV of France and later Pope Boniface VIII and the Curia romana. He wrote prolifically on medical and theological topics, but his most famous work today is his crusade treatise.

== Life ==
Little is known of the life of Galvano da Levanto and most of what is known is derived from his writings. The Da Levanto family, which took its name from town of Levanto, was relatively prominent in Genoa in the 13th century, but Galvano's relationship to them cannot be stated precisely. The family produced at least two other doctors around the same time, Federico and Ranuccio, who practiced at Genoa and Pera between 1267 and 1281. Several of his relatives took up service with the French crown. Most notably, Iacopo da Levanto served as an admiral of King Louis IX of France (1226–1270). In Galvano's time, the Da Levanto were effectively clients of the Fieschi family.

Galvano was born in the second half of the 13th century, probably in Genoa. He received a good scientific and biblical education, probably obtained at either the Franciscan or Dominican school in Genoa. He dedicated several of his works to Franciscans, including his teacher, Benedetto d'Alba. The Liber anniversarium of the Franciscans of Genoa includes him as "master Galvano, physician, devout and faithful friend". He also expressed admiration for the Dominicans. Although he had been claimed as a priest, a Franciscan or even a Benedictine, he is known to have had a wife, Iacopina, and at least two sons. He is depicted as layman alongside his wife and children in a miniature from an illuminated manuscript of his works. It is possible he belonged to the Third Order of Saint Francis.

There is no evidence that Galvano was ever papal chief physician, as sometimes stated. In fact, there is no evidence he ever practiced medicine at Genoa. Nevertheless, there is no doubt he was a physician by training. Evidence of his training is found in his citations to Hippocrates, Galen and the Antidotarium of Pseudo-Mesue. He usually identifies himself by name and trade in his writings, calling himself "Galvano the Genoese of Levanto, shadow of a physician". The term "shadow of a physician" (Latin umbra medici), which he uses in other places also, has been interpreted variously, but is probably just a show of modesty. It need not be read as implying that he never actually practiced medicine. It has at times been misread as Umbriae medici, implying that he was from Umbria.

In his Ars navigativa spiritualis, Galvano writes of a serious illness and his belief that he owed his recovery to divine intervention. In his Liber sancti passagii, which he wrote between 1291 and 1295 and dedicated to King Philip IV of France, he refers to financial troubles. He presumably hoped for patronage from Philip, but did not get it. He appears to have gone to Rome for the Jubilee of 1300. He received patronage from two cardinals, Luca Fieschi and Pietro Valeriani Duraguerra. In 1303, he submitted a collection of theological writings to Pope Boniface VIII for scrutiny.

The date of Galvano's death is unknown. A document of 4 April 1312 refers to Iacopina as a widow. He probably died in Genoa not long before that date.

== Works ==
Galvano is shown presenting a copy of his writings to Pope Boniface in both Paris 3181 (top) and the Vatican manuscript (bottom). In the former he is depicted correctly as a layman, but in the latter erroneously as a monk.

Galvano da Levanto wrote at least 18 distinct works, all in Latin and most of them short. They did not see a wide diffusion and are preserved in just four manuscripts. Most survive in single copies. By manuscript, his surviving works are:

- Paris, Bibliothèque nationale de France, Nouv. acq. lat. 669
  1. Liber sancti passagii christicolarum contra Sarracenos pro recuperatione Terre Sancte
- Vatican City, Apostolic Library, Lat. 2463
  1. Thesaurus corporalis prelatorum ecclesie Dei et magnatum fidelium contra nocumentum digestionis stomachi
  2. Remedium salutare contra catarrum
  3. Liber paleofilon curatius langoris articulorum multiplicis dolorosi Galuani
  4. Salutare carisma ex sacra scriptura
- Berlin, Staatsbibliothek Preußischer Kulturbesitz, Lat. quart. 773
  1. Chrisma sanatiuum tremoris cordis
  2. Liber saluatoris contra morbum caducum
  3. Liber doctrine curatiue langoris leprosi
- Paris, Bibliothèque nationale de France, Lat. 3181
  1. Ars navigativa spiritualis
  2. Liber fabrice corporis mistici et regiminis eius relati ad caput quod est Christus Dominus a quo totum corpus misticum quod est Ecclesia recipit motum et sensum (Boniface VIII)
  3. Liber neophytus spiritualis thesauri indulgentiarum sanctissimi papae Bonifatii VIII
  4. Neophyta doctrina de inferno, purgatorio et paradiso
  5. Liber de amando Deum
  6. Liber doctrine agni immaculati Iehsu Christi
  7. Tractatus alphabeti Christiphere Marie
  8. Thesaurus religiose paupertatis
  9. Liber contemplationis neophyte de gratia Dei gradiens super corpus humanum et eius regimen conservativum et curativum
  10. Tyriaca mortis spiritualis gradiens super tyriacam medicorum

Paris 3181 may be an autograph. It contains the works submitted to the pope in 1303 and was catalogued in the papal library in 1311. The Vatican manuscript is a presentation copy intended for Pope Boniface. It includes a presentation miniature showing a kneeling Galvano presenting his book to a seated Boniface surrounded by twelve prelates. Paris 669 and the Berlin manuscript are from the 15th century. The surviving manuscripts are interconnected. The Berlin manuscript refers to the Liber contemplationis (in Paris 3181) and the Vatican manuscript to the Liber doctrine (in Berlin). Other manuscripts of Galvano's works are listed in the papal catalogues of 1295, 1311 and 1399. One lost work by Galvano is known, the Liber manu Dei contra calculosum languorem sanctissimo pape Bonifatii VIII intitulato. Like the Liber neophytus and Liber fabrice, it was dedicated to Boniface VIII.

== Bibliography ==
- Gautier-Dalché, Patrick [in French] (2005). "Levanto, Galvano da". Dizionario Biografico degli Italiani (in Italian). Vol. 64: Latilla–Levi Montalcini. Rome: Institute of the Italian Encyclopaedia. ISBN 978-88-12-00032-6.
- Kohler, Charles (1898). "Traité de recouvrement de la Terre Sainte adressé vers l'an 1295 à Philippe le Bel par Galvano de Levanto, médecin génois". Revue de l'Orient latin. 6: 343–369.
- Leopold, Antony R. (2000a). How to Recover the Holy Land: The Crusade Proposals of the Late Thirteenth and Early Fourteenth Centuries. Ashgate.
- Petti Balbi, Giovanna (1986). "Arte di governo e crociata: il Liber sancti passagii di Galvano da Levanto". Studi e ricerche. 7: 131–168.
- Salvatelli, Luca (2015). "The Manuscript Vat. lat. 2463: Some Considerations about a Medieval Medical Volume of Galvanus de Levanto" (PDF). Medical Manuscript Studies. 1: 1–7.
- Thorndike, Lynn (1929). "Vatican Latin Manuscripts in the History of Science and Medicine". Isis. 13 (1): 53–102. JSTOR 224598.
- Ziegler, Joseph (1998). Medicine and Religion c. 1300: The Case of Arnau de Vilanova. Oxford University Press.
