= Via ad Terram Sanctam =

Start of the Memoria in BnF lat. 14693

The Via ad Terram Sanctam is an anonymous Old French treatise on the recovery of the Holy Land from around 1300. There is a Latin translation made about the same time that goes under the title Memoria Terre Sancte. Within a century, one excerpt had also appeared in a Hebrew translation.

== Synopsis ==
The treatise begins with an introduction. In the Latin edition, this is replaced by a different and longer introduction. The treatise attempts to answer three questions about a crusade to recover the Holy Land: the proper season of the year for such an undertaking, the port of disembarkation and the route from there to Jerusalem and how to invade Egypt after the Holy Land has been secured.

In answer to the first question, the ideal date for arriving in the Holy Land is said to be the Feast of the Cross (14 September). The Latin version specifies that the proper day for sailing to meet this timeline is eight days before the middle of August. The reasons given for choosing the late summer are primarily meteorological.

In answering the second question, the author considers and excludes the ports of Alexandria, Damietta, Acre and Tripoli, as well as a landing on Cyprus. Alexandria, in enemy hands, is said to be too difficult to take. Damietta is in a ruined state and its port insufficient. The ports of Acre and Tripoli are likewise insufficient and the surrounding territory too hostile. The disadvantages of landing in Cyprus are apparent from the Seventh Crusade. The ideal port is said to be Ayas in Cilician Armenia. The army should winter there and begin its march the following spring by way of Antioch and Damascus. In this section, the author shows good knowledge of Armenia.

In the final section, the author describes the route of march from Gaza to Cairo, naming the inhabited places, the possibilities for provisioning and giving relative distances.

The Latin edition deletes sections on establishing an alliance with the Mongols and on wintering the fleet in Ayas and using it during land operations. It adds a section on financing the crusade and reorganizing the Kingdom of Jerusalem after a successful expedition.

== Date and authorship ==
The Via's editor, Charles Kohler, argues that the original version was written prior to the fall of Tripoli (1289). He also puts forward Otto de Grandson as the author. Alan Forey accepts his dating, but rejects Otto as a potential author. Sylvia Schein argues that the Via depends on the work of Hayton of Corycus and must be later than 1307. Christopher Tyerman prefers a date between these extremes. Antony Leopold dates the French version to shortly after 1293 and certainly before the suppression of the Templars beginning in 1307. The Latin version was created after 1307, since it suppresses mention of the Templars. The translator was present, however, for Pope-elect Gregory X's farwell speech at Acre in 1271.

== Manuscripts ==
A single manuscript of the Old French version survives. Oxford, Bodleian Library, MS Ashmole 342, the French manuscript of the Via, is from the early 14th century. It contains mostly astrological texts. The Latin version is preserved in at least five manuscripts. In these it sits mostly alongside geographical texts. It was the geographical interest of the work that led an anonymous Jew to partially translate the Memoria into Hebrew in the 14th century. This religiously neutral Hebrew version of a crusading text is found in a single manuscript, now Parma, Biblioteca Palatina, De Rossi 1426. It is written in Sephardic cursive and was probably produced in Provence.

== Bibliography ==
- Forey, Alan (2017). "Otto of Grandson and the Holy Land, Cyprus and Armenia". Crusades. 16: 79–93. doi:10.1080/28327861.2017.12220191.
- Kohler, Charles (1903–1904). "Deux projets de croisade en Terre-Sainte, composés a la fin du XIII^{e} siècle et au début du XIV^{e}" (PDF). Revue de l'Orient latin. 10: 406–457.
- Leopold, Antony R. (2000). How to Recover the Holy Land: The Crusade Proposals of the Late Thirteenth and Early Fourteenth Centuries. Ashgate. ISBN 9780754601203.
- Roth, Pinchas; Rubin, Jonathan (2017). "A Medieval Hebrew Adaptation of Two Crusading Texts: Presentation, Analysis and Edition". Medieval Encounters. 23 (6): 508–530. doi:10.1163/15700674-12340010.
