= Guillaume Adam =

Dominican missionary, writer, and archbishop

Guillaume Adam (Latin: Guillelmus Adae), also known in English as William Adam (died c. 1341), was a Dominican missionary, writer, and French Catholic archbishop.

Adam served as the Papal missionary in Persia from 1314 to 1317, one of six Dominicans sent by Pope John XXII to Persia. However, it is now thought that Adam was probably in Persia before 1314, during the pontificate of Pope Clement V.

He was transferred to Smyrna in 1318, and served as their bishop. In 1322, he was promoted to archbishop of Soltaniyeh in Persia.

On 26 October 1324, he was elected Archbishop of Antivari in the Old Doclea. After a disagreement with the Pope, Adam stepped down as archbishop in 1341.

William wrote one treatise on the recovery of the Holy Land—De modo sarracenos extirpandi in 1316/1317—and he has been put forward as the author of the anonymous Directorium ad passagium faciendum, written in 1332.

== Works ==
- De modo Sarracenos extirpandi (ca. 1316–1317)
- Arbor caritatis
- Sermones
- ? Directorium ad passagium faciendum (1332)
