= Pietro Vesconte =

Italian cartographer (fl. 1310–1330)

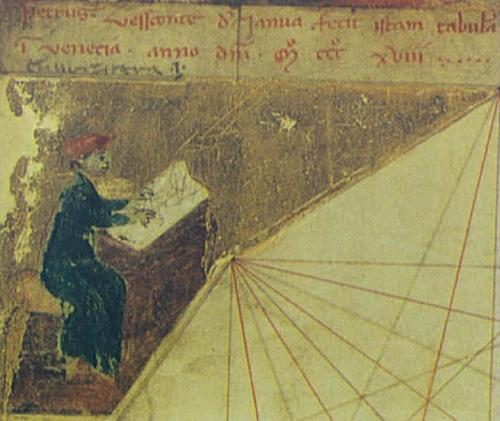
- Image of a cartographer, assumed to be Pietro Vesconte himself, from the 1318 Vesconte atlas (Museo Correr, Venice)
- Born: Genoa, Republic of Genoa
- Occupation: Cartographer

Pietro Vesconte (fl. 1310–1330) was an Italian cartographer and geographer from the Republic of Genoa. A pioneer of the field of the portolan chart, he influenced Italian and Catalan mapmaking throughout the fourteenth and fifteenth centuries. He appears to have been the first professional mapmaker to sign and date his works regularly.

== Life ==
Although Vesconte was born in Genoa, he produced much of his work in Venice. He was active between 1310 and 1330, producing numerous maps. His nautical charts are among the earliest to map the Mediterranean and Black Sea regions accurately. He also produced progressively more accurate depictions of the coastlines of northern Europe, in particular that of Britain and, to a lesser extent, Ireland.

Pietro Vesconte's 1311 portolan chart of the east Mediterranean is the oldest signed and dated nautical chart that survives from the medieval period. He is also the author of at least four signed multi-sheet atlases (1313, 1318a, 1318b, c. 1321), where the various sheets can be combined into a single nautical chart. There is also an atlas (1321) and a solitary portolan chart (1327) signed by "Perrino Vesconte", assumed to be either Pietro himself or possibly a younger relative member of his family using a diminutive form of 'Pietro'. The image of a mapmaker at work, which appears in a Vesconte atlas of 1318, may depict the chartmaker himself.

Pietro Vesconte brought his experience as a maker of portolans to bear on the mappa mundi (circular world map) he produced, which introduced a previously unheard of accuracy to the genre. He provided a world map, nautical atlas, a map of the Holy Land and plan of Acre and Jerusalem for inclusion in Marino Sanuto's Liber secretorum fidelium crucis, a work which aimed to encourage a new crusade. There are three known copies of Sanuto's Liber (c. 1320–21, c. 1321, c. 1325) that include Vesconte's maps, only the first of which is signed; the latter two are confidently assumed to have been done by him, or at least under his direction.

== Works by or attributed to Vesconte ==
The following works have been signed or attributed to Pietro Vesconte.

- 1311 dated & signed portolan chart of the east Mediterranean, held (C.N.1) by the Archivio di Stato in Florence, Italy.
- 1313 dated & signed atlas of six sheets held (DD 687) by the Bibliothèque Nationale de France in Paris, France. (1. calendar, 2. Black Sea, 3. Aegean Sea, 4. east Mediterranean, 5. central Mediterranean, 6. west Mediterranean and British Isles)
- 1318 dated & signed atlas of seven sheets held (Port. 28) by Museo Correr in Venice, Italy. (1 calendar, 2. Black Sea, 3. east Medit., 4. central Med., 5. west Med, 6. Spain and north Africa, 7. north Atlantic)
- 1318 dated & signed atlas of ten sheets held (MS 594) by Österreichische Nationalbibliothek in Vienna, Austria. (1.calendar, 2. Black Sea, 3. east Medit., 4. central Medit. (south), 6. central Medit. (north) 7. west Medit., 8. Spain and French Atlantic coast, 9. British Isles, 10. Adriatic Sea)
- c.1320-21 undated but signed by Vesconte, for Marino Sanudo's Liber secretorum, mappa mundi plus atlas of five sheets (partially missing), held (Pal. Lat.1362A) by the Bibliotheca Apostolica in Vatican City (2. Black sea, 3. Aegean, 4. Palestine & east Medit. 5. Adriatic and North Africa, 6. west Medit and north Atlantic)
- 1321 dated and signed Perrino Vesconte, atlas of five sheets held (R.P.4) by the Zentralbibliothek in Zurich, Switzerland. (1 calendar, 2. Spain and north Atlantic, 3. central Medit., 4. east Medit. 5. Black Sea)
- c.1320-21 undated Atlas of the Mediterranean Sea and Atlantic Coasts of Europe, attributed to Petrus Vesconte de Ianua. Eighteen folios (nine sheets) on vellum parchment, currently held by the Bibliothèque municipale de Lyon (MS 175), but available to view online at Gallica): folios 1–2. Calendar, 3–4. Rhumbline Network, 5–6.Black Sea, 7–8. Eastern Mediterranean Basin, 9–10. Central Mediterranean Basin, 11–12. Western Mediterranean Basin A, 13–14. Western Mediterranean Basin B, 15–16. Atlantic Coasts (including Great Britain and Ireland), 17–18. Sicily and the Adriatic.
- c.1321 undated and unsigned, confidently attributed to Vesconte, for Marino Sanudo's Liber secretorum, mappa mundi and atlas of five sheets held (Vat. Lat. 2972) by the Bibliotheca Apostolica in Vatican City (1. Black Sea, 2. Aegean and north Africa, 3. Palestine & east Medit. 4. central medit,5. west Medit and north Atlantic)
- c.1325 undated and unsigned, confidently attributed to Vesconte, for Marino Sanudo's Liber secretorum, mappa mundi and atlas of five sheets, held (Add MS 27376) by the British Library, in London, UK. (1. Spain and north Atlantic, 2. central Medit., 3. Palestine & east Medit., 4. Aegean & north Africa, 5. Black Sea)
- 1327 dated and signed Perrino Vesconte, portolan chart, held (Med Palat.248) by the Biblioteca Medicea Laurenziana in Florence, Italy.

=== Gallery ===
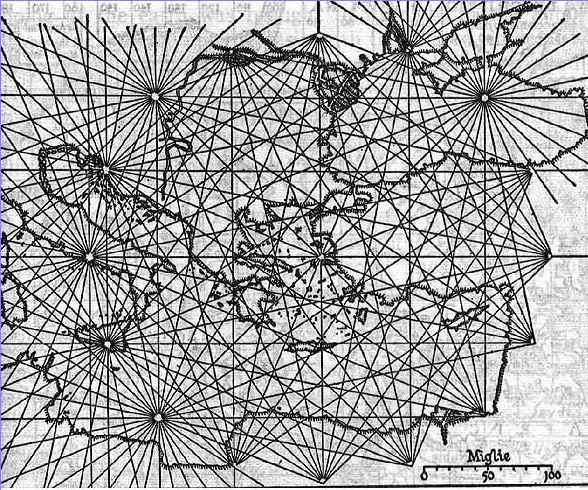
Pietro Vesconte's 1311 portolan of the eastern Mediterranean, the first signed portolan chart (Archivio di Stato, Florence)

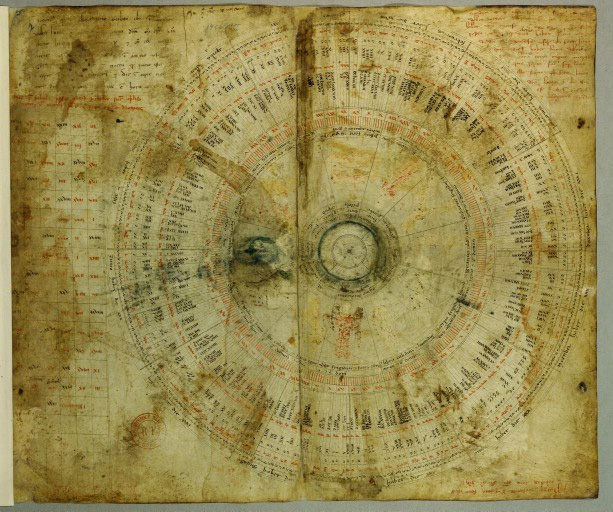
Astronomical calendar from the 1313 atlas of Pietro Vesconte. (Bibliothèque Nationale de France, Paris)

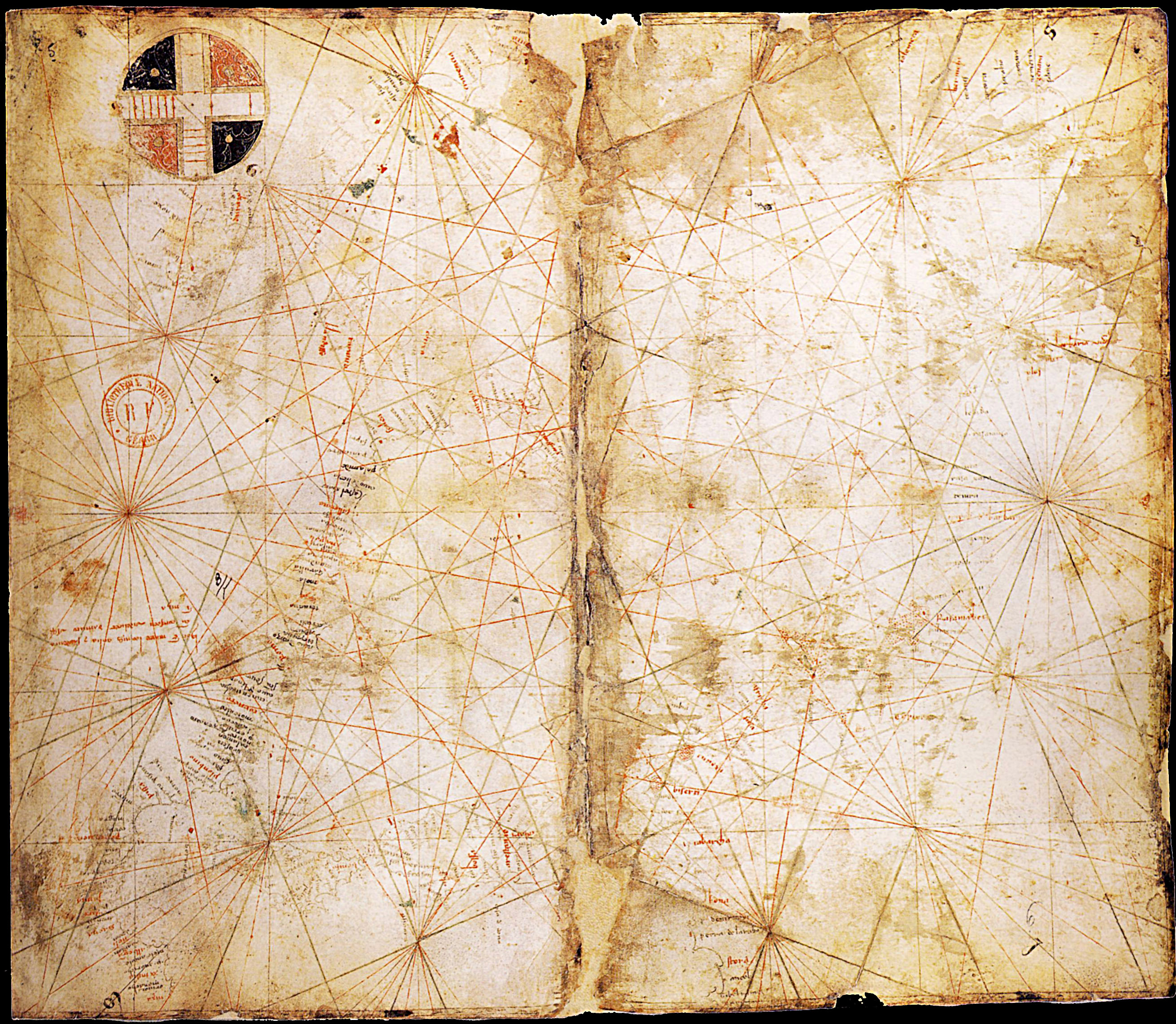
Atlantic map, sheet from the 1313 atlas of Pietro Vesconte. (Bibliothęque Nationale de France, Paris)

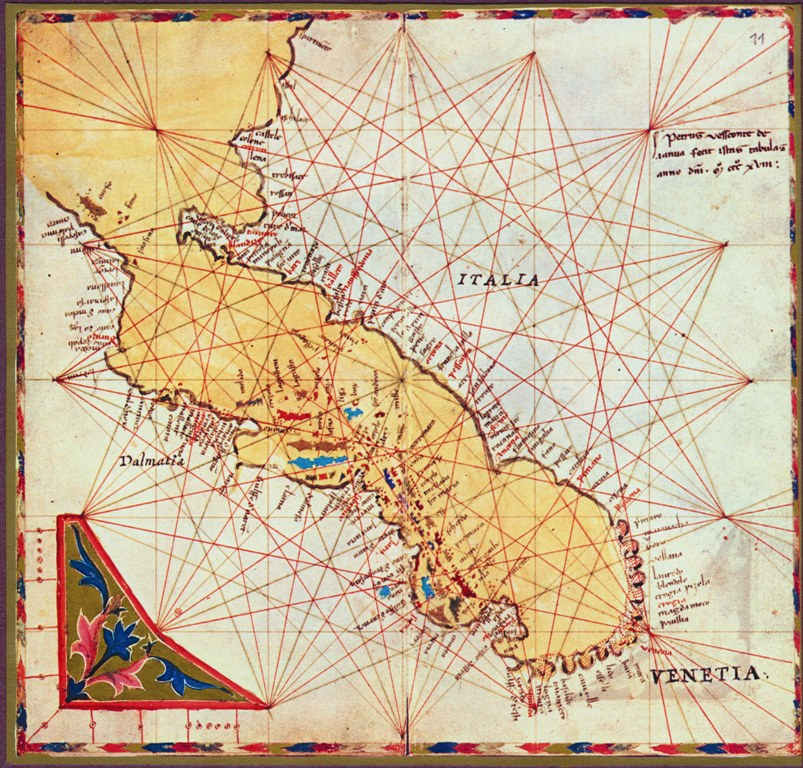
Map of the Adriatic Sea, sheet from the 1318 atlas of Pietro Vesconte (Österreichische Nationalbibliothek, Vienna)

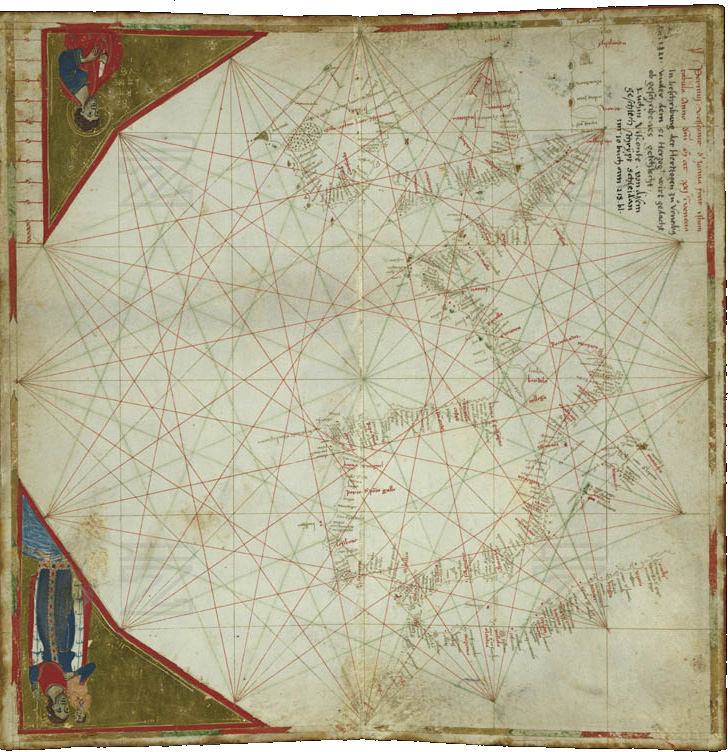
Atlantic map, sheet from the 1321 atlas of "Perrino" Vesconte (Zentralbibliothek Zurich)

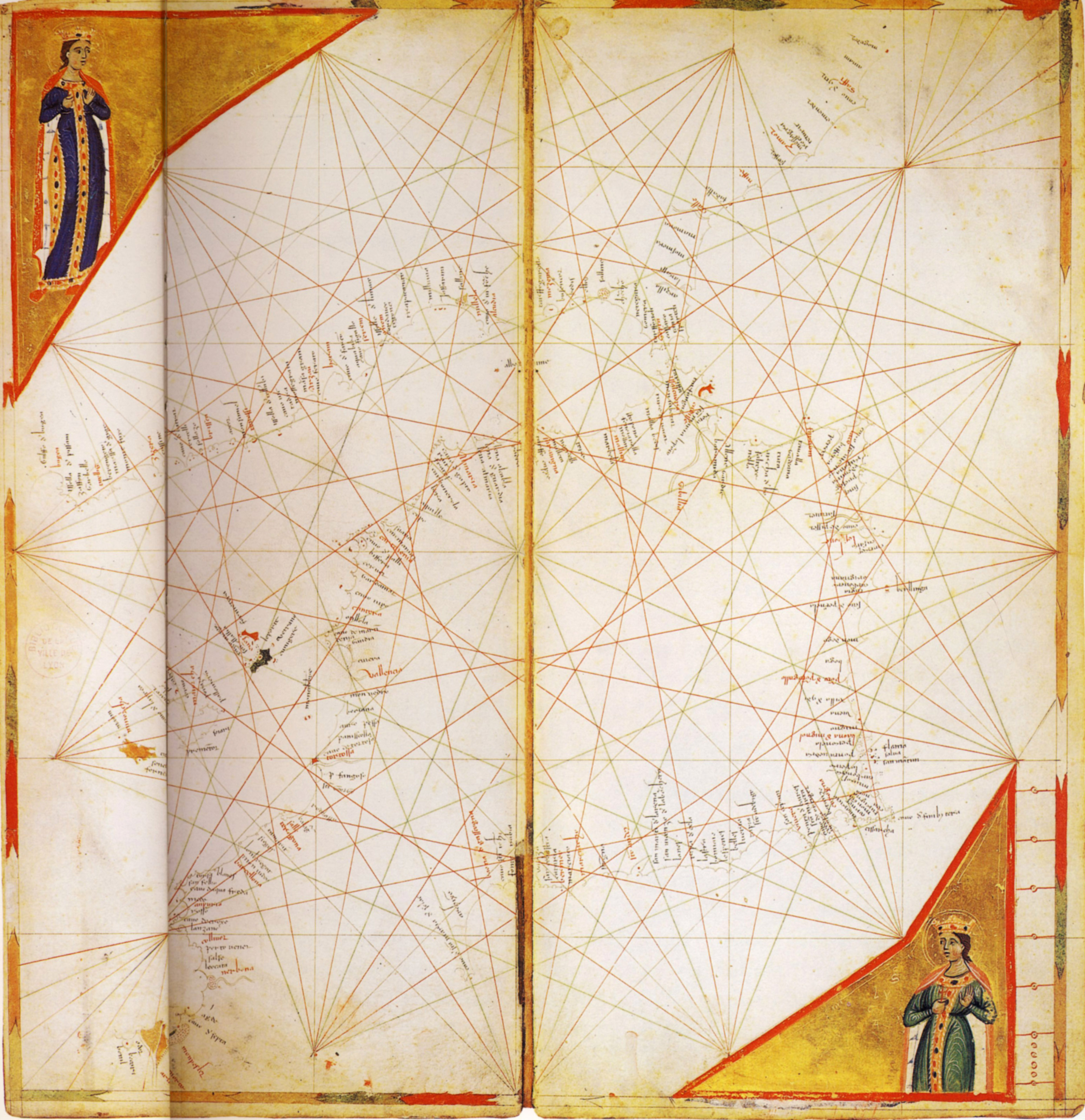
west Mediterranean map, sheet from Pietro Vesconte c. 1321 atlas (Bibliothèque municipale de Lyon)

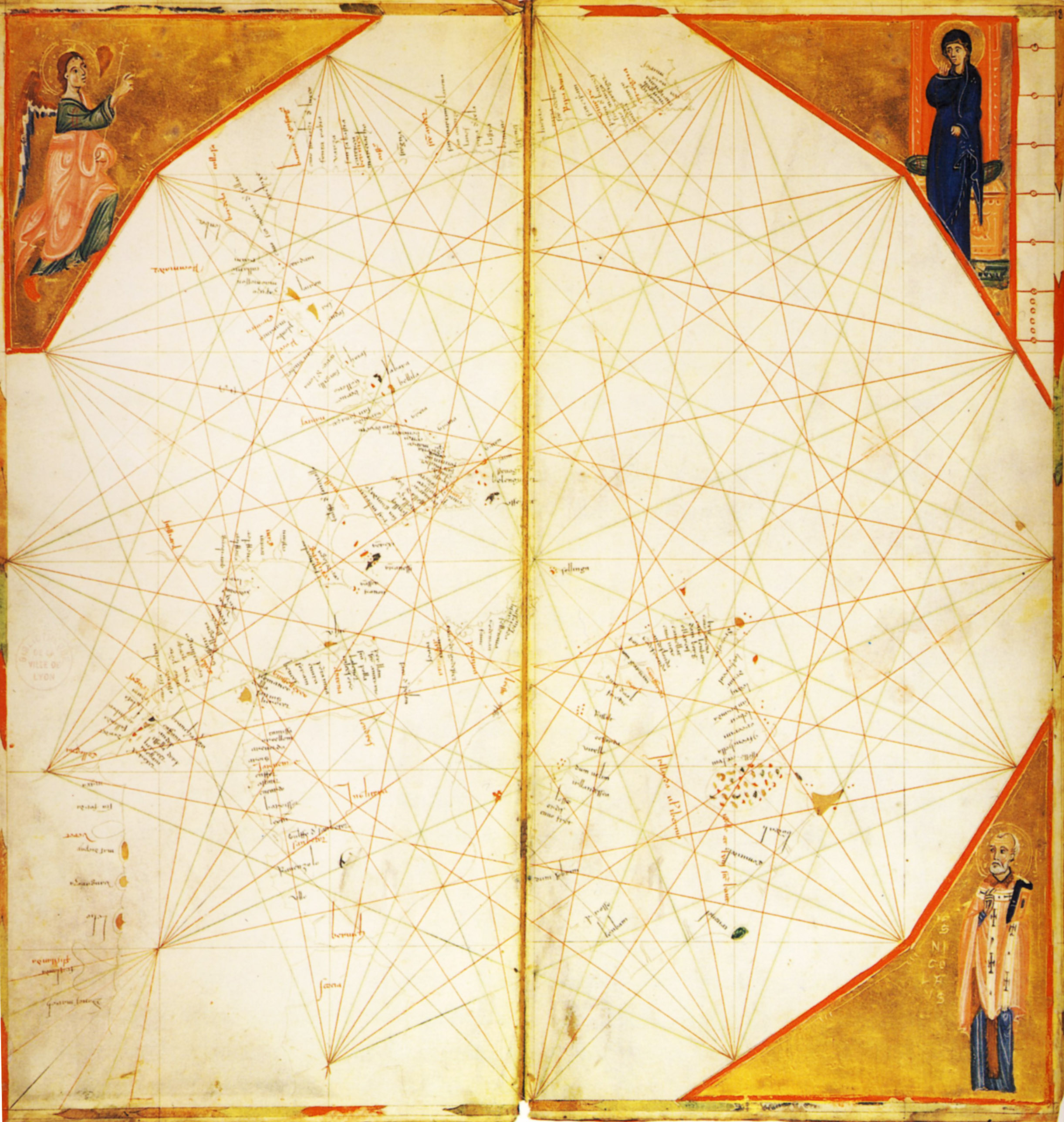
north Atlantic (France, Britain, Ireland) map, sheet from Pietro Vesconte c. 1321 atlas (Bibliothèque municipale de Lyon)

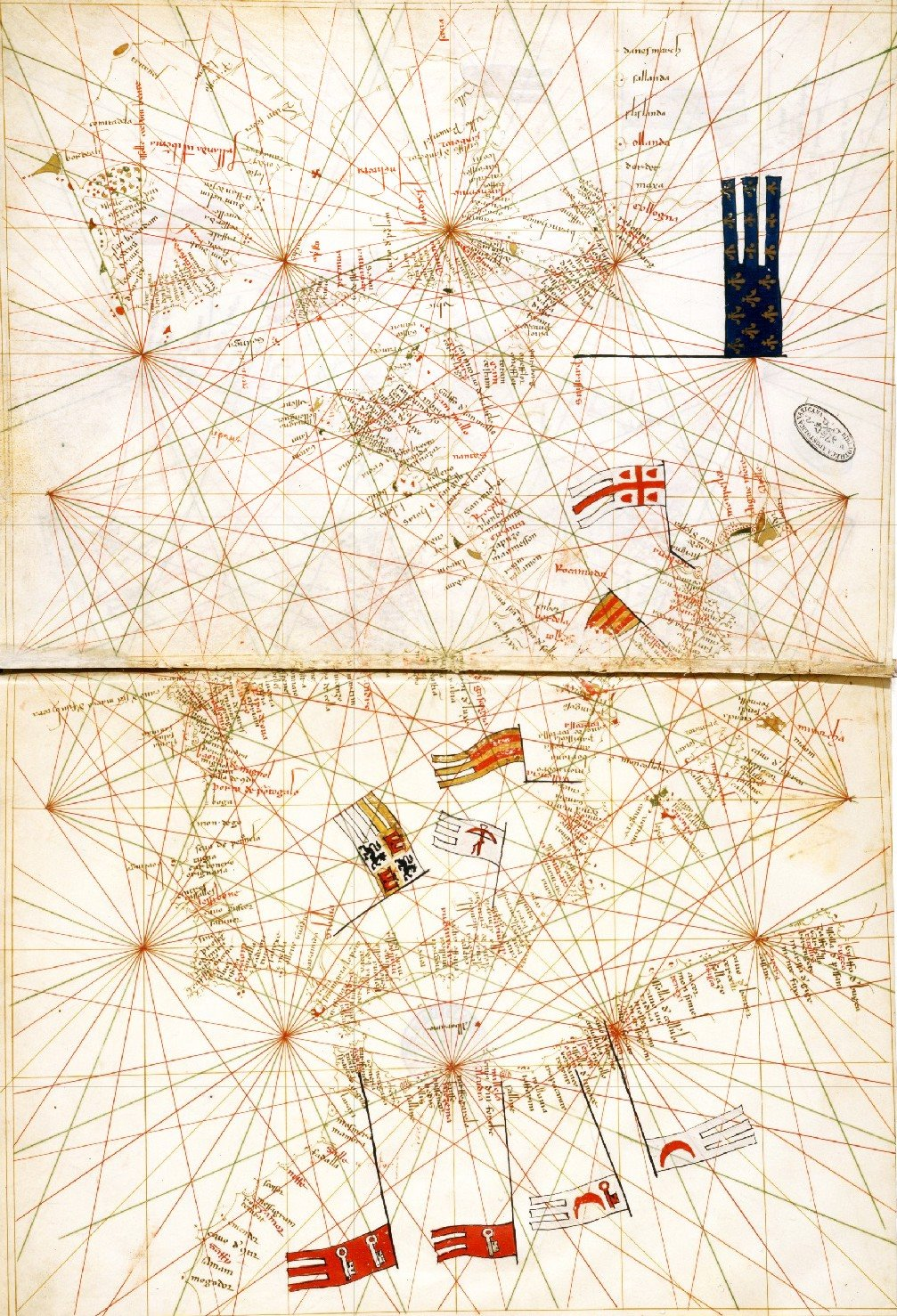
Atlantic map, sheet from Vesconte's c.1321 atlas for Marino Sanuto's Liber Secretum (Vatican Library)

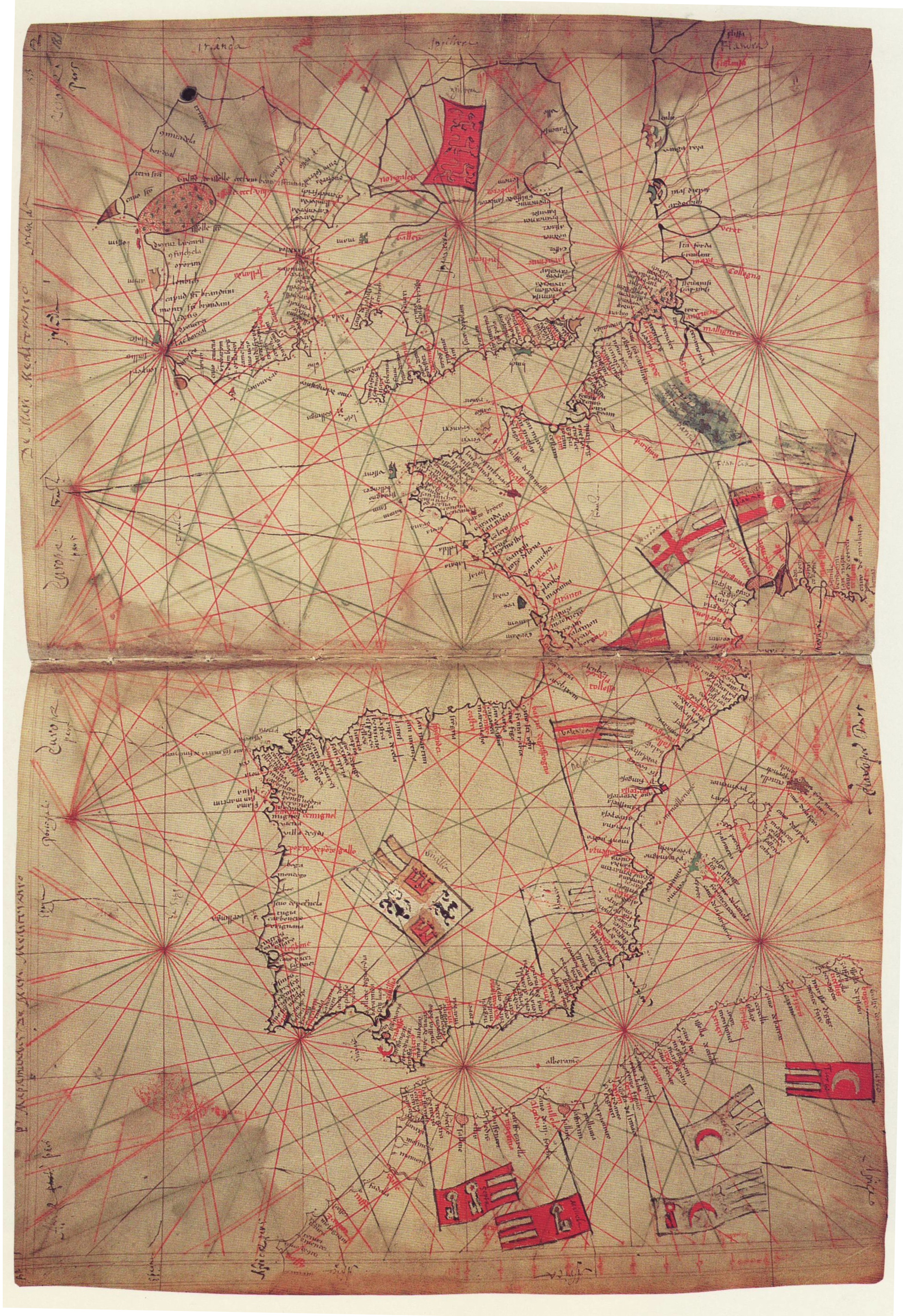
Atlantic map, sheet from Vesconte's c.1325 atlas for Marino Sanuto's Liber Secretum (British Library)

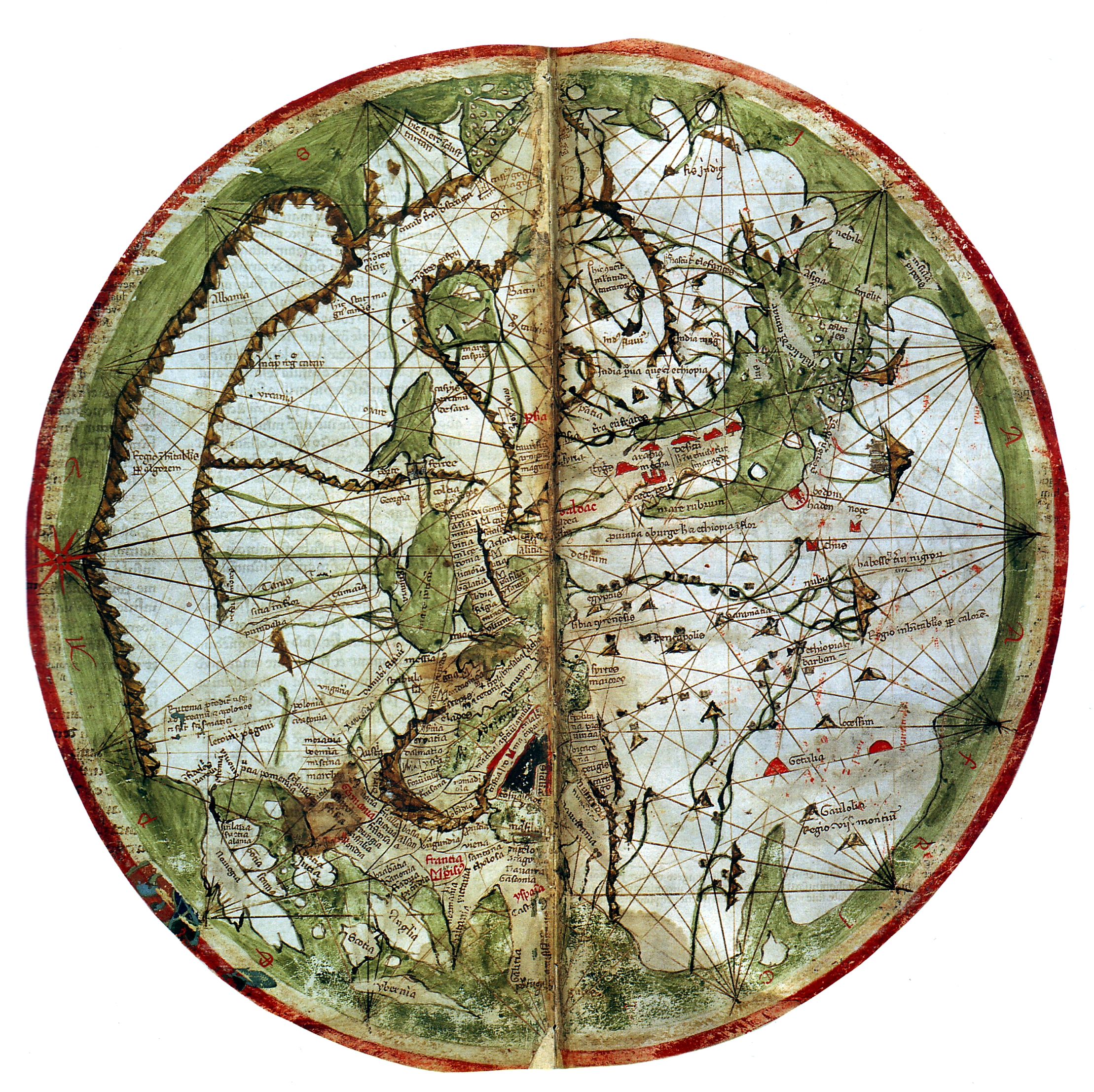
Pietro Vesconte's Mappa Mundi from Marino Sanuto's Liber secretorum (oriented with East at the top)

== Sources ==
- Cortesão, Armando (1969) History of Portuguese Cartography, Lisbon: Ultramar.
