= Emanuele Piloti =

Venetian merchant

Emanuele Piloti (fl. 1397–1441) was a Venetian merchant who spent over two decades in Egypt and wrote a treatise on the recovery of the Holy Land.

== Life ==
Piloti's life is known almost exclusively from his treatise. He was born to a Venetian family on Crete in 1370–1371. The exact place of his birth is uncertain, but his later writings evince some familiarity with the area around Palaikastro. His family appears to have been of the merchant class. His nickname was Mannoli.

Piloti became a merchant around the age of twenty-five. He dealt mainly in amber, saffron, wine and cloth (silk, velvet and gold). He visited Alexandria, Patras, Thessaloniki, Famagusta and Venice. He visited Damascus before its sack by Timur in 1400 and afterwards, both before and after it was rebuilt. He lived in Mamluk Egypt for twenty-two years, although not necessarily continuously. He was first there in 1396–1397. In that year, he saw in Cairo some 200 French and Italian prisoners from the Battle of Nicopolis who had converted to Islam and were being given to the Sultan Barquq by a Turkish emir.

In 1409–1410, the Sultan Nasir al-Din Faraj sent Piloti and another envoy to Giacomo Crispo, Duke of the Archipelago, to negotiate the release of 150 Muslim merchants who had been captured by Pedro de Larraondo near Antalya. The negotiated ransom of the prisoners through Venetian mediation is confirmed by other sources, although Piloti is not named. Afterwards, Piloti had a personal audience with the sultan, although he could not speak Arabic sufficiently well at the time.

Piloti left Egypt in 1420, perhaps dissatisfied with the Egyptian tariff regime. He seems to have settled in Florence. He may have returned to Egypt in 1426, after the Mamluk campaign against Cyprus, but this is not certain. He met Pope Eugene IV once between 1431 and 1434. He had a high opinion of the pope, but a poor opinion of the papal court. He received a payment from the Apostolic Camera on 5 January 1438. The date and place of his death are unknown.

== Works ==
Piloti wrote a strategic treatise on the recovery of the Holy Land. His was one of the last such treatises, written at a time when the focus of crusading had already shifted towards the Ottoman threat in the Balkans. He began the work, which he labels a tractatus, in 1420 and completed it in 1438, before learning of Sultan Barsbay's death on 7 June that year. He completed it while living in Italy. He dedicated the work to Pope Eugene IV. He wrote the original in Latin or perhaps in his native Venetian, later translating it into Latin. In 1441, he made a French translation from the Latin version. Only a single manuscript copy of the French version is preserved, now MS 15701 in the Bibliothèque royale de Belgique. This manuscript had once been owned by Duke Philip the Good.

The Latin title of the treatise is De modo, progressu, ordine ac diligenti providentia habendis in passagio Christianorum pro conquesta Terrae Sanctae ('On the manner, progress, order and diligent preparation to be kept in the passage of the Christians for the conquest of the Holy Land'). He proposed a crusade against Egypt to take Alexandria and Cairo preparatory to conquering the Holy Land. He provides detailed descriptions of those cities and of Egyptian trade. He estimates the number of mounted Mamluk troops in Egypt at 7,000–8,000. A fleet of 120 ships under Venetian control could take Alexandria (which was suffering from population decline) and enforce an embargo on trade with Syria. He predicted the fall of Constantinople to the Turks, which took place in 1453, but his strategy focused entirely on Egypt and Syria under the Mamluks.

Piloti reports that he engaged in religious discussions with Muslims and once reported a Muslim who blasphemed Jesus to the authorities. He displays firsthand knowledge of Muslim belief and practice, but his view of Islam was conventionally Western. He describes the faith as "bestial" (hedonistic) and forced on the people at swordpoint. Much of the good Piloti has to say about the Islamic world is designed to shame Christendom into more effectively resisting it.

De modo is chronologically imprecise, indicating that Piloti wrote mostly from memory. He did use Marino Sanudo Torsello's Liber secretorum fidelium crucis, copies of which he saw in Venice. In its wealth of detail based on personal observation, De modo bears some resemblance to the contemporary works of Ghillebert de Lannoy and Bertrandon de la Broquière. Its overview of the Egyptian economy is of great value to the historian and Piloti's economic knowledge compares with Francesco Balducci Pegolotti's Pratica della mercatura.

In the modern edition by Pierre-Herman Dopp, De modo runs to 240 pages.

== Bibliography ==
- Christ, Georg L. K. A. (2012). Trading Conflicts: Venetian Merchants and Mamluk Officials in Late Medieval Alexandria. Brill.
- Coulon, Damien (2004). "Du nouveau sur Emmanuel Piloti et son témoignage à la lumière de documents d'archives occidentaux". In Damien Coulon; Catherine Otten-Froux; Paule Pagès; Dominique Valérian (eds.). Chemins d'outre-mere: Études d'histoire sur la Méditerranée médiévale offertes à Michel Balard. Éditions de la Sorbonne. pp. 159–170.
- Dopp, Pierre-Herman, ed. (1958). Traité d'Emmanuel Piloti sur le passage en Terre Sainte (1420). Publications de l'Université Lovanium de Kinshasa.
- Housley, Norman (2007). "Emmanuele Piloti and Crusading in the Latin East". In Karl Borchardt; Nikolas Jaspert; Helen J. Nicholson (eds.). The Hospitallers, the Mediterranean and Europe: Festschrift for Anthony Luttrell. Ashgate. pp. 139–150.
- Leopold, Antony R. (2000). How to Recover the Holy Land: The Crusade Proposals of the Late Thirteenth and Early Fourteenth Centuries. Ashgate. ISBN 9780754601203.
- Luttrell, Anthony (1962). "Emmanuele Piloti and Criticism of the Knights Hospitallers of Rhodes, 1306–1444". Annales de l'Ordre souverain militaire de Malte. 20 (1): 11–17.
- Musarra, Antonio (2015). "Piloti, Emanuele". Dizionario Biografico degli Italiani (in Italian). Vol. 83: Piacentini–Pio V. Rome: Institute of the Italian Encyclopaedia. ISBN 978-88-12-00032-6.
