= Philippe de Mézières =

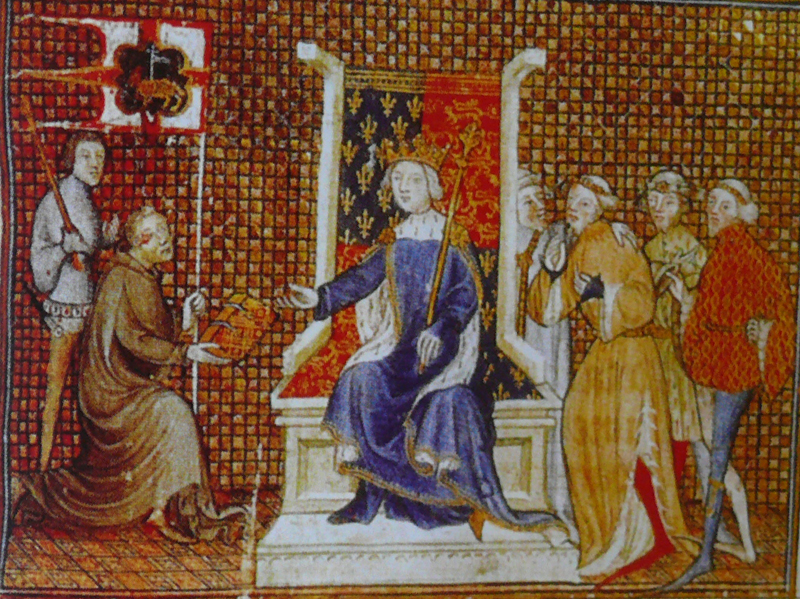
Philippe and Richard II

Philippe de Mézières (c. 1327 – May 29, 1405), a French soldier and author, was born at the chateau of Mézières in Picardy.

== Period of soldiering (1344–1358) ==
Philippe belonged to the poorer nobility. At first, he served under Luchino Visconti in Lombardy but within a year he entered the service of the husband of Joanna I of Naples, Andrew, Duke of Calabria, who was the son of the King Charles I of Hungary. Andrew was assassinated very soon in September 1345. In the autumn of that year, Philippe set out for the East in the French army. After the Battle of Smyrna in 1346 he was made a knight, and when the French army was disbanded, he made his way to Jerusalem. He realized the advantage which the discipline of the Saracens gave them over the disorderly armies of the West, and conceived the idea of a new order of knighthood, but his efforts proved fruitless. The first sketch of the order was drawn up by him in his Nova religio passionis (1367–1368; revised and enlarged in 1386 and 1396). From Jerusalem he found his way in 1347 to Cyprus to the court of Hugh IV, where he found a kindred enthusiast in the king's son, Peter of Lusignan, then count of Tripoli; but he soon left Cyprus, and had resumed his career as a soldier of fortune when the accession of Peter to the throne of Cyprus (Nov. 1358) and his recognition as king of Jerusalem induced Philippe to return to the island, probably in 1360, when he became chancellor.

== Cypriot period (1360–1372) ==
Philippe came under the influence of the pious legate Peter Thomas (d. 1366), whose friend and biographer he was to be, and Thomas, who became Latin patriarch of Constantinople in 1364, was one of the chief promoters of the crusade of 1365. In 1362 Peter of Cyprus, with the legate and Philippe visited the princes of western Europe in quest of support for a new crusade, and when the king returned to the east he left Philippe and Peter Thomas to represent his case at Avignon and in the cities of northern Italy. They preached the crusade throughout Germany, and later Philippe accompanied Peter to Alexandria. After the capture of this city he received the government of a third part of it and a promise for the creation of his order, but the Crusaders, satisfied by the immense booty, refused to continue the campaign.

In June 1366 Philippe was sent to Venice, to Avignon and to the kingdoms of western Europe, to obtain help against the Saracens, who now threatened the kingdom of Cyprus. His efforts were in vain; even Pope Urban V advised peace with the sultan. Philippe remained for some time at Avignon, seeking recruits for his order, and writing his Vita S. Petri Thomasii (Antwerp, 1659), which is invaluable for the history of the Alexandrian expedition. The Prefacio and Epistola, which form the first draft of his work on the projected order of the Passion, were written at this time.

Philippe returned to Cyprus in 1368, but was still at Venice when Peter was assassinated at Nicosia at the beginning of 1369, and he remained there until 1372, when he went to the court of the new pope Gregory XI at Avignon. He occupied himself with trying to establish in the west of Europe the feast of the Presentation of the Virgin, the office of which originated in the Greek church and had later been adopted by the Latin church in Cyprus (Coleman, pp. 3–4, 43). In 1373 he was in Paris, and he was thenceforward, together with intellectuals like Nicole Oresme, one of the trusted counselors of Charles V, although this king had refused to be dragged into a crusade. He was tutor to his son, the future Charles VI, but after the death of Charles V he was compelled, with the other counselors of the late king, to go into retirement.

== Parisian period (1373–1405) ==
Philippe lived thenceforward in the convent of the Celestines in Paris, but nevertheless continued to exert an influence on public affairs, and to his close alliance with Louis of Orleans may be put down the calumnies with which the Burgundian historians covered his name. When Charles VI freed himself from the domination of his uncles, Philippe's power increased. Philippe supported the Avignon claimant to the papacy, Clement VII at the outbreak of the Great Schism.

To this period of Philippe's life belong most of his writings. Two devotional treatises, the Contemplatio horae mortis and the Soliloquuum peccatoris, belong to 1386–1387. In 1389 he wrote his Songe du Vieil Pèlerin, an elaborate allegorical voyage in which he described the customs of Europe and the near East, and advocated peace with England and the pursuit of the Crusade. His Oratio tragedica, largely autobiographical, was written with similar aims. In 1395 he addressed to Richard II of England an Epistre pressing his marriage with Isabella of Valois and encouraging him to make peace with France and going into a new Crusade against the Turkish armies that were breaking into Europe. The effort to enlist Richard in the crusade failed. Only the forces of France, led by John the Fearless, assisted the armies of the King Sigismund of Hungary, who was coordinating the fight. However, not listening the plans of the King, the French forces marched to defeat in the Battle of Nicopolis; and the whole campaign ended in a disaster. This defeat inspired Philippe with no enthusiasm, and justified his fears and was the occasion of his last work, the Epistre lamentable el consolatoire, in which he put forward once more the principles of his order as a remedy against future disasters.

Some of Philippe's letters were printed in the Revue historique (vol. xlix.); the two épistres just mentioned in Kervyn de Lettenhove's edition of Froissart's Chroniques (vols. xv. and xvi.). The Songe du vergier or Somnium viridarii, written about 1376, is sometimes attributed to him, but without definite proofs.

== Bibliography ==
- Antoine Becquet, Gallicae coelestinorum congregationis monasteria, fundationes . . . . (1719). * Abbé Jean Lebeuf, Mémoires in the Mémoires of the Academy of Inscriptions, vols. xvi. and xvii. (1752 and 1753).
- J. Delaville le Roulx, La France en Orient au xiv. siècle (1886–1890).
- A. Molinier, Manuel de bibliographie historique, vol. iv. (1904).
- N. Jorga, Philippe de Mézières, et la croisade au xiv. siècle (1896). Jorga gives a list of his works and of the MSS. in which they are preserved, and analyses many of them.
- N. Jorga, Bibliothèque de l'ecole des hautes études, vol. 110 (Paris 1896). Especially valuable .
- P. Paris, Mémoires vol. xv. (1843) of the Academy of Inscriptions. (Songe du vergier)
- R. Blumenfeld-Kosinski, Poets, saints, and visionaries of the Great Schism, 1378-1417, University Park, Pa. : Pennsylvania State University Press, 2006.
- J. Blanchard, Philippe de Mézières. Un monde rêvé d’Orient en Occident (Paris: Passés/ Composés, 2024)
- Claire-Marie Schertz, De l'épée a la plume : la construction de l'auctorialité dans l'œuvre de Philippe de Mézières, Thèse de doctorat, Université de Lausanne, 2019. (Lire en ligne)
