= Juan Fernández (bishop of León) =

Juan Fernández (died 17 December 1316) was the bishop-elect of León in 1315–1316.

Prior to his election, Juan had been a canon of the cathedral chapter of León holding the archdeaconry of Saldaña since at least 1300. In January 1300, he was entrusted with conveying the testamentary donation of Pedro Díaz de Castañeda to the monastery of Santa María de Aguilar. By the time of his election, he was the dean of the chapter. He was elected between 20 August and 15 September 1315, when he received the standard charter of privileges from King Alfonso XI and his regents (María de Molina, Pedro de Castilla and Juan el Tuerto) during a session of the cortes in Burgos. His election ended a vacancy of two years following the transfer of Bishop Gonzalo de Hinojosa.

Juan's election was challenged, however, by a Leonese canon named Juan García and by Gonzalo, the treasurer of Oviedo Cathedral. They travelled all the way to the papal court in Avignon, where Juan was to be confirmed. The suit was heard by Cardinal Berengar Fredol, who dismissed it for improper venue because the plaintiffs had not raised the issue at the time of the election but had brought it directly to the Holy See. He handed down his verdict on 30 October 1316, but Juan was not confirmed before his death on 17 December 1316. He left his houses, which were worth 20,000 maravedíes, to the chapter to finance anniversary masses for his soul. His death was followed by another long vacancy before the election of García de Ayerbe in 1318.
