= Recovery of the Holy Land =

Genre of literature in mediaeval Europe

Start of the Directorium ad passagium faciendum, in a French translation by Jean de Vignay, from a manuscript of the 1330s

Works on recovery of the Holy Land (Latin: recuperatio Terrae Sanctae) form a genre in High–Late Medieval Christian literature about the Crusades. These treatises and memoranda concerning how to recover the Holy Land for Christendom first appeared during preparations for the Second Council of Lyon in 1274. They proliferated following the loss of Acre in 1291, shortly after which the permanent Crusader presence in the Holy Land came to an end, but mostly disappeared with the cancellation of Philip VI of France's planned crusade in 1336 and the start of the Hundred Years' War between England and France the next year. The high point of recovery proposals was the pontificate of Clement V (r. 1305–1314).

== History ==
Neither the first loss of Jerusalem in 1187 nor its final loss in 1244 led to a surge of written crusade proposals. In both cases, the crusade planning in response was left to secular rulers. In 1291, however, Pope Nicholas IV issued two bulls requesting advice on recovering the Holy Land. He was not the first pope to do so. Innocent III first requested advice from the Crusader states in the Holy Land in 1199 and in 1213 requested written advice in his summons to the Fourth Lateran Council. In the bull Salvator noster (31 March 1272) and again in 1273, Gregory X issued similar requests for advice in writing in preparation for the Second Council of Lyon.

=== Treatises of 1274 ===
The first piece of written advice in response to a request: William of Tripoli's De statu saracenorum (here in the Courtenay Compendium)

There are four surviving treatises written in response to Gregory X's appeals. They are different in form and content from those produced after 1291. The earliest, the De statu saracenorum of William of Tripoli, may have been requested and written even before Gregory was elected pope. William, however, advised sending missionaries rather than armies. Gilbert of Tournai's Collectio de scandalis ecclesiae, probably written in response to the appeal of 1273, saw the solution to the problem of the crusade in moral reform and regeneration in the West. Bruno of Olomouc, in his Relatio de statu ecclesiae in regno alemaniae, likewise concentrated on Europe, advising the prosecution of the crusade in eastern Europe under the general direction of King Ottokar II of Bohemia to bring peace at home before bringing the war to the Holy Land. The only one of these early treatises to somewhat resemble those that came later is the Opus tripartitum of Humbert of Romans, which argued against criticism of crusading and for careful planning prior to any expedition. Both Gilbert and Humbert advised against a passagium generale (a large-scale general expedition) and in favour of "perpetual crusade", a regular stream of small, professional expeditions.

The four treatises produced for the Council of Lyon were all written by clerics and are less practical and strategic than those that came after 1291. Much of the strategic planning in 1274 took place orally. The most important source for Gregory X's discussions with secular rulers concerning the crusade is the autobiographical Llibre dels fets of King James I of Aragon. James proposed to send a force of 500 knights and 2,000 infantry to defend Acre. The Templar grand master, William of Beaujeu, also recommended sending reinforcements immediately. In the end, Gregory X did send a force of knights and archers, albeit smaller than what either James or William had proposed. He also instituted a tax of one penny a head on all Christians to finance an expedition, which was perhaps inspired by Gilbert of Tournai's treatise.

The treatises of 1274 are not generally considered to belong to the same genre as those that came after 1291. Antony Leopold calls them "antecedents of the recovery treatises". For Sylvia Schein, the earlier treatises were "working papers submitted for conciliar discussions", while the "de recuperatione treatises" were "a new genre of crusade literature" consisting of "practical guidelines … largely concerned with general strategy as well as with detailed plans."

=== Treatises after 1291 ===
==== Nicholas IV ====
The first of the recovery treatises that can be precisely dated, the Liber de recuperationis Terrae Sanctae of Fidentius of Padua, had its genesis in Gregory X's appeals, but took so long to complete that it was not finished until 1290 or 1291, just before loss of Acre. At least one other treatise may have been written before the fall of Acre. The Via ad Terram Sanctam was written in Old French possibly even before 1289 and translated into Latin after 1307. It is more likely, however, that it was written shortly after the fall of the city.

Galvano da Levanto writing, as depicted in a contemporary manuscript

Nicholas IV, who had attended the council of Lyon and was probably inspired by Gregory's example, issued a new appeal for advice after the fall of Acre in the bulls Dirum amaritudinis (13 August 1291) and Dura nimis (18 August). At least three treatises were written during his pontificate, including that of Fidentius. All three advocated a first attack on Mamluk Egypt to establish a beachhead, followed by a naval blockade, before making an assault on the Holy Land. All saw Christian superiority at sea as the key to defeating the Mamluks. The first response to Nicholas's appeal came from Ramon Llull, who wrote a letter to Nicholas, Epistola pro recuperatione Terrae Sanctae, and a more thorough tractate, Tractatus de modo convertendi infideles, both dated 1292. King Charles II of Naples, who claimed the throne of Jerusalem, wrote a restrained and practical proposal that was probably not published until the 1292–1294 papal interregnum. One other treatise appeared during the interregnum, that of Galvano da Levanto.

==== Clement V ====
Neither Boniface VIII nor Benedict XI made appeals for advice and no recovery proposals are known from their pontificates. Clement V, however, issued such an appeal in one of his first encyclicals in 1305. In 1308, he issued a new request for proposals for the Council of Vienne, which convened in 1311. The grand masters of the military orders of the Templars and Hospitallers both wrote responses to the first request. That of the Hospitaller Fulk of Villaret formed the basis of the Crusade of 1309, which helped the Hospitallers consolidate their hold on Rhodes but failed to disrupt much Mamluk trade. The Templar master Jacques de Molay's treatise broke with the tendency of the rest by advocating a large-scale operation, perhaps influenced by the capture of the Templar garrison on Ruad in 1307. Around the same time, the Armenian Hayton of Korykos visited Europe and produced a recovery treatise at Clement's express request.

Four proposals were written for the Council of Vienne. Llull wrote a new proposal advising the creation of schools in oriental languages and the unification of the military orders. While the former goal was realized, the latter was not. In fact, the council condemned the Templars and in 1312 the order was dissolved. King Henry II of Cyprus sent a letter to the council bearing his advice. William of Nogaret and Bishop William of Angers also wrote proposals. The latter concentrated on preparations in Europe, believing that military matters were best left to experts. He did not believe that another crusade would be possible for at least a decade. Molay aside, the treatises written for Clement V emphasised the blockade of Egypt.

Several independent treatises were also written during the pontificate of Clement V. In 1305, Lull wrote a new proposal addressed to King James II of Aragon. In March 1309, he wrote his last proposal. Both advised the Spain–Africa route to the Holy Land, requiring first a crusade against the Kingdom of Granada. With papal support, a crusade against Algeciras was launched by James of Aragon and Ferdinand IV of Castile in August that year. In 1306, Pierre Dubois wrote De recuperatione Terre Sancte, divided into two parts dedicated, respectively, to Edward I of England and Philip IV of France. It is a rambling treatise that covers many topics only tangentially related to the crusade.

The anonymous Descriptio Europae Orientalis, written around 1310–1311, is a crusade proposal for the recovery, not of the Holy Land, but of the Empire of Constantinople.

=== Treatises after 1314 ===
Charging Nubians, as illustrated from a copy of Sanudo's treatise

After Clement V, no pope requested written advice on the recovery of the Holy Land. In 1316–1317, William of Adam wrote a proposal based on his extensive travels. It was intended for the court of the newly elected Pope John XXII. Initiative for the recovery, however, had passed to the French crown. Philip V appointed Count Louis of Clermont as commander of his planned crusade. Louis requested and received a written brief from the city of Marseille, where some galleys were under construction in 1318. No crusade came of these efforts. Philip then held three councils on the crusade in 1319–1320. Following the first of these, William Durant wrote a proposal, Informatio brevis, probably intended for the king.

Simultaneously with Philip V's final council, Marino Sanudo Torsello presented to John XXII his Liber secretorum fidelium crucis, which was to become the most famous of recovery treatises. Sanudo later presented a copy to King Charles IV of France in 1322. He had worked on the Liber from 1306 to 1321. One of his prominent proposals was an alliance with the Nubia to attack Egypt from two sides. Just such a strategic pincer is illustrated in the illuminated copy of the Liber that he presented to the pope.

Sanudo witnessed some of the negotiations between John and Charles over an expedition to aid Armenia, in which the king proposed a three-stage crusade with progressively larger forces. The pope asked the cardinals to evaluate the plan. Several of their responses survive, all negative. The last proposal intended for Charles IV was written by García de Ayerbe, who laid stress on a Franco-Spanish alliance.

Illustration of one of Guido da Vigevano's contraptions for Philip VI's planned crusade

Charles's successor, Philip VI, made a serious effort to launch a crusade, which he publicly announced in 1333. He had previously requested and received written advice from the Republic of Venice, urging the blockade of Egypt and defensive actions against the Anatolian Turks. In 1332, he had received an anonymous and detailed treatise, the Directorium ad passagium faciendum. In 1335, Guido da Vigevano wrote Philip an unusual treatise about maintaining his health while on crusade and about various contraptions Guy had designed for prosecuting the war. Around that time, Roger of Stanegrave dedicated a treatise to King Edward III of England, who was planning to join Philip's crusade.

The creation of the first Holy League in 1332 signalled a fundamental shift away from recovery of the Holy Land to defence of Europe from the Turks. Pope Benedict XII cancelled Philip's projected crusade in 1336 amid the rising tensions that would lead to the outbreak of the Hundred Years' War in 1337. As a result, "the golden age of the literary genre of the de recuperatione Terrae Sanctae", begun in 1290, came to an end.

=== Treatises after 1336 ===
For several decades, no new written crusade proposals appeared. The first original crusade proposal after 1336 was that of Philippe de Mézières in his Songe du vieil Pèlerin of 1389. He published it after the Truce of Leulinghem established peace between France and England. He urged the kings of both countries to lead a general crusade, but only after a preparatory crusade led by a new military order intended to supersede all existing ones. In 1395, Philippe wrote a letter to King Richard II of England with another proposal.

In 1420, Emanuele Piloti dedicated his Tractatus to Pope Eugene IV. He had personal experience of the East, but depended heavily on the prior work of Sanudo. He translated his own work into French in 1441. Like Philippe de Mézières, Piloti wrote on his own initiative. Two other memoranda on the crusade were written on the orders of Duke Philip the Good of Burgundy. Both writers, Guillebert de Lannoy (1420) and Bertrandon de la Broquière (1432), had undertaken reconnaissance missions to the East. Unlike the classical recovery treatises, their memoranda were mainly reconnaissance reports.

Although most recovery treatises were written in the first half of the 14th century, they continued to be copied throughout the 15th. That of Hayton of Korykos was even translated into Spanish as late as 1595 by Amaro Centeno, who saw its proposed Franco-Mongol alliance as a model for a Spanish–Safavid alliance in his own day. Giovanni Dominelli's 1609 proposal is a singular late example of the genre.

== List of works ==
=== Anonymous ===
- Directorium ad passagium faciendum (1332)
- Informationes Massilie pro passagio transmarino (1318)
- Tractatus dudum habitus (1306/1307)
- Via ad Terram Sanctam (1289/1291), possibly by Otto de Grandson

=== Authors ===
Philippe de Mézières's Songe du vieil Pèlerin in a 15th-century manuscript

- Bertrandon de la Broquière, Le voyage d'Outremer (1433)
- Bruno of Olomouc, Relatio de statu ecclesiae in regno alemaniae (1273/1274)
- Charles II of Naples, Le conseil du Roi Charles (1292/1294)
- Emanuele Piloti, Tractatus de modo, progressu, ordine ac diligenti providentia habendis in passagio Christianorum pro conquesta Terrae Sanctae (1438)
- Fidentius of Padua, Liber de recuperationis Terrae Sanctae (1290/1291)
- Fulk of Villaret, Hec est informatio (1306/1307)
- Galvano da Levanto, Liber sancti passagii (1292/1294)
- García de Ayerbe, Informacio de pertinentibus ad passagium (1322/1328)
- Gilbert of Tournai, Collectio de scandalis ecclesiae (1273/1274)
- Giovanni Dominelli (1609)
- Guido da Vigevano, Texaurus regis Francie (1335)
- Guillebert de Lannoy, Les Pelerinages de Surye et de Egipte (1421)
- Hayton of Korykos, Flos historiarum terre orientis (1307)
- Henry II of Cyprus, Consilium (1311)
- Humbert of Romans, Opus tripartitum (1273/1274)
- Jacques de Molay, Consilium super negotio Terre Sancte (1307)
- Jean Germain, Le discours du voyage d'oultremer au très victorieux roi Charles VII (1452)
- Marino Sanudo Torsello, Liber secretorum fidelium crucis (1321)
- Pierre Dubois, De recuperatione Terre Sancte (1306)
- Philippe de Mézières, Songe du vieil Pèlerin (1389)
- Ramon Llull
  - Epistola summo pontifici Nicolao IV pro recuperatione Terrae Sanctae (1292)
  - Tractatus de modo convertendi infideles (1292)
  - Liber de fine (1305)
  - Petitio Raymundi in concilio generali ad adquirendam Terram Sanctam (1308)
  - Liber de acquisitione (1309)
- Roger of Stanegrave, Li charboclois d'armes du conquest precious de la terre sainte de promission (1333/1336)
- William of Adam, De modo sarracenos extirpandi (1316/1317)
- William Durant, Informatio brevis (1319)
- William Le Maire, Gesta Guillelmi Majori (1308/1311)
- William of Nogaret, Quae sunt advertenda (1308/1311)
- William of Tripoli, De statu saracenorum (1273/1274)

== Bibliography ==
- Atiya, Aziz Suryal (1938). The Crusade in the Later Middle Ages. Methuen.
- Barker, Hannah (2020). That Most Precious Merchandise: The Mediterranean Trade in Black Sea Slaves, 1260–1500. University of Pennsylvania Press.
- Baldwin, Philip Bruce (2014). Pope Gregory X and the Crusades. The Boydell Press.
- De Nicola, Bruno (2026). "Eurasia desde Iberia: una historia de mongoles en la España del siglo XVI". In Antonio García Espada; Bruno De Nicola (eds.). Mongoles en el Oeste: Noticias de la integración euroasiática en los reinos ibéricos. Brill. pp. 399–430.
- García Espada, Antonio (2026). "Crusading Plans for the Recovery of the Holy Land and the Eurasian Integration, 1300–1500". In Magnus Ressel; Emir O. Filipović (eds.). Companion to the Later Crusades (1400–1700). De Gruyter Oldenbourg. pp. 283–306.
- Kedar, Benjamin Z.; Schein, Sylvia (1979). "Un projet de «passage particulier» proposé par l'ordre de l'Hôpital, 1306–1307". Bibliothèque de l'École des chartes. 137 (2): 211–226.
- Leopold, Antony R. (1998). Crusading Proposals of the Late Thirteenth and Early Fourteenth Centuries (PhD dissertation). University of Durham.
- Leopold, Antony R. (2000a). How to Recover the Holy Land: The Crusade Proposals of the Late Thirteenth and Early Fourteenth Centuries. Ashgate. ISBN 9780754601203.
- Leopold, Antony R. (2000b). "Crusading Proposals in the Fourteenth and Fifteenth Centuries". Studies in Church History. 36: 216–227. doi:10.1017/S0424208400014431. S2CID 163915321.
- Menache, Sophia (1998). Clement V. Cambridge University Press.
- Schein, Sylvia (1980). The West and the Crusades: Attitudes and Attempts, 1291–1312 (PhD dissertation). Cambridge University.
- Schein, Sylvia (1984). "The Future regnum Hierusalem: A Chapter in Medieval State Planning". Journal of Medieval History. 10 (2): 95–105. doi:10.1016/0304-4181(84)90003-4.
- Schein, Sylvia (1991). Fideles Crucis: The Papacy, the West, and the Recovery of the Holy Land, 1274–1314. Clarendon Press.
- Schein, Sylvia (2006). "Recovery of the Holy Land". In Alan V. Murray (ed.). The Crusades: An Encyclopedia. Vol. 4: Q–Z. ABC-CLIO. pp. 1019–1021.
- Simmons, Adam (2019). The (Re)Introduction of Nubia and Ethiopia to Europe During the Crusading Era, c.1100–c.1400 (PDF) (PhD diss.). Lancaster University.
- Simmons, Adam (2022). Nubia, Ethiopia, and the Crusading World, 1095–1402. Routledge.
- Tyerman, Christopher J. (1985). "Philip VI and the Recovery of the Holy Land". The English Historical Review. 100 (394): 25–52. doi:10.1093/ehr/C.CCCXCIV.25. JSTOR 569926.
- Živković, Tibor; Petrović, Vladeta; Uzelac, Aleksandar; Kunčer, Dragana, eds. (2013). Anonymi Descriptio Europae Orientalis = Anonimov Opis istočne Evrope: kritičko izdanje teksta na latinskom jeziku, prevod i filološka analiza Dragana Kunčer (PDF). Istorijski institut Beograd. ISBN 9788677431020.
