= Pierre Dubois (scholastic) =

French political author and early Gallican

Pierre Dubois (c. 1255 – after 1321), a French publicist in the reign of Philip the Fair, was the author of a series of political pamphlets embodying original and daring views.

Dubois was known to Jean du Tillet in the 16th, and to Pierre Dupuy in the 17th century, but remained practically forgotten until the middle of the 19th century, when his history was reconstructed from his works. He was a Norman by birth, probably a native of Coutances, where he exercised the functions of royal advocate of the bailliage and procurator of the university.

== Early life and education ==
Dubois was born in Normandy, France and was educated at the University of Paris, where he heard St. Thomas Aquinas and Siger of Brabant. He was, nevertheless, no adherent of the scholastic philosophy, and appears to have been conversant with the works of Roger Bacon. He wrote his anonymous Summaria, brevis et compendiosa doctrina felicis expeditionis et abbreviationis guerrarum et litium regni Francorum, which is extant in a unique manuscript held in the Vatican, and is analysed by Natalis de Wailly in the Bibliothèque de l'École des Chartes (2nd series, vol. iii). There is no indication that Dubois frequented the French court, and it is unlikely that his tracts were read there, let alone by the king. Since Dubois advocated the subordination of the nobility under the crown and the secularisation of all church property, it is not surprising that he did not put his name to his tracts and was clearly concerned about his own safety.

== Career ==
In the contest between Philip the Fair and Pope Boniface VIII Dubois identified himself completely with the secularizing policy of Philip, and poured forth a series of anti-clerical pamphlets, which did not cease even with the death of Boniface. His Supplication du peuple de France au roy contre le pape Boniface le VIII, printed in 1614 in Acta inter Bonifacium VIII. et Philippum Pulchrum, dates from 1304, and is a heated indictment of the pope's temporal power.

He represented Coutances in the states-general of 1302, but in 1306 he was serving Edward I as an advocate in Guienne, without apparently abandoning his Norman practice by which he had become a rich man. The most important of his works, his treatise on the recovery of the Holy Land, De recuperatione terrae sanctae, was written in 1306, and dedicated in its extant form to Edward I, though it is certainly addressed to Philip.

Dubois outlines the conditions necessary to a successful crusade—the establishment and enforcement of a state of peace among the Christian nations of the West by a council of the church; the reform of the monastic, and especially of the military, orders; the reduction of their revenues; the instruction of a number of young men and women in oriental languages and the natural sciences with a view to the government of Eastern peoples; and the establishment of Charles of Valois as emperor of the East. The king of France was in fact, when once the pope was deprived of the temporal power, to become the suzerain of the Western nations. As part of the establishment of the pre-eminence of the French crown, the Habsburgs (then only ambitious upstarts from Switzerland) should receive a settlement, thus excluding far more powerful families such as the Luxembourgs from the triple crown of Germany, Italy, and the Holy Roman Empire. In a later and separate memoir, Dubois proposed that Philip the Fair should cause himself to be made emperor by Pope Clement V, effectively correcting the aberration (as Dubois saw it) that the imperial dignity of the Holy Roman Empire, which Pope Leo III had conferred on Charlemagne, ended up descending down the Eastern Frankish, then Saxon, then German successors of Charlemagne, instead of the Western Frankish and eventually French successors.

His zeal for the crusade was probably subordinate to the desire to secure the wealth of the monastic orders for the royal treasury, and to transfer the ecclesiastical jurisdiction to the crown. His ideas on education, on the celibacy of the clergy, and his schemes for the codification of French law, were far in advance of his time. He was an early and violent "Gallican," and the first of the great French lawyers who occupied themselves with high politics.

In 1308 he attended the states-general at Tours. He is generally credited with Quaedam proposita papae a rege super facto Templariorum, a draft epistle supposed to be addressed to Clement by Philip. This was followed by other pamphlets in the same tone, in one of which he proposed that a kingdom founded on the property of the Templars in the East should be established on behalf of Philip the Tall.
