= Famagusta expedition (1607) =

Failed Tuscan conquest of Cyprus

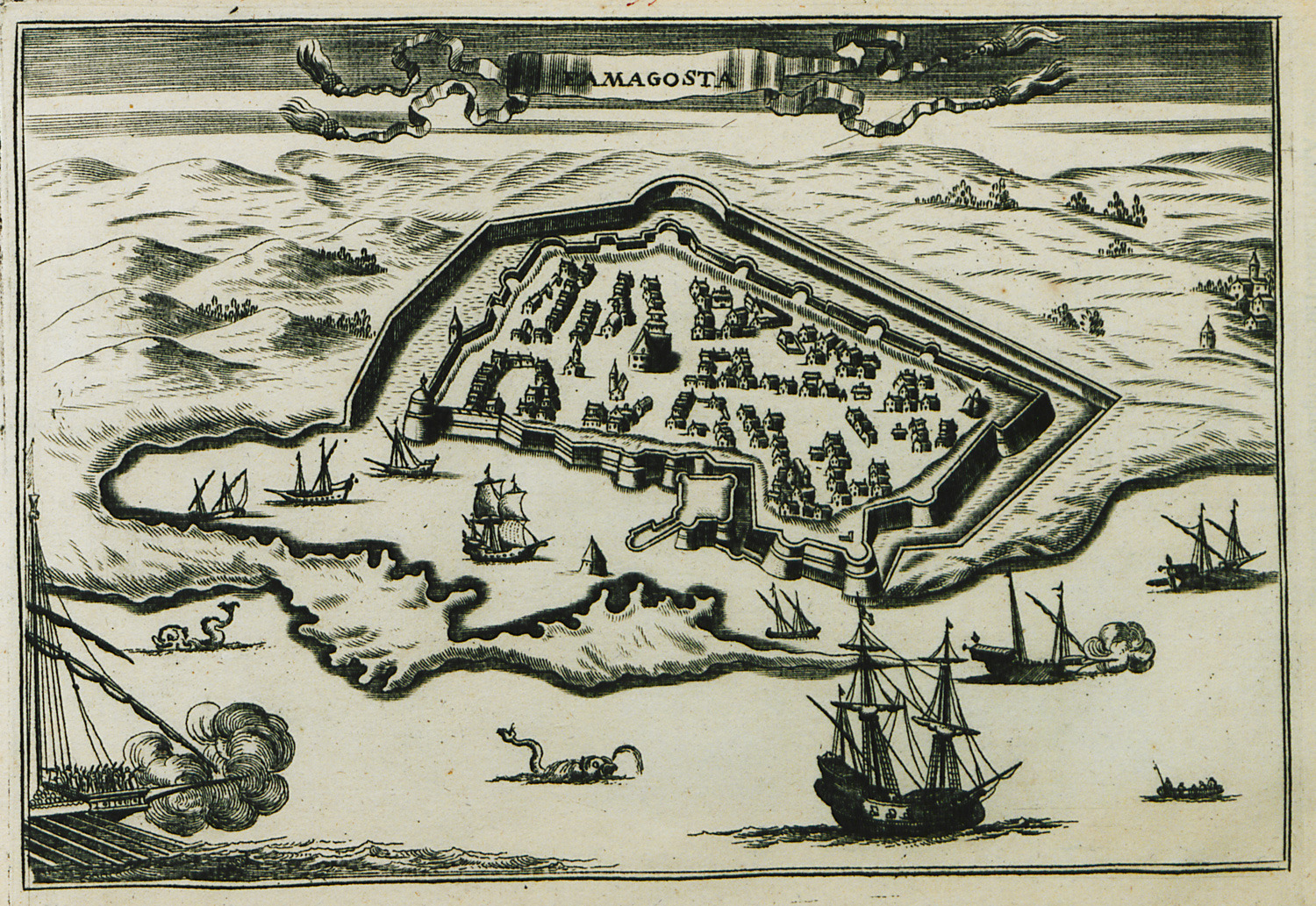
- Famagusta in 17th century
Date	24 June 1607
Location	Famagusta, Cyprus
Result	Ottoman victory

Belligerents
Grand Duchy of Tuscany	Ottoman Empire

Commanders and leaders
(Tuscany) Francesco Maria del Monte	Unknown

Strength
2,200 men 17 ships	Unknown

Casualties and losses
21 killed 20 wounded	Unknown

The Famagusta expedition was launched by the Tuscans in an attempt to reconquer the island of Cyprus from the Ottomans. The Tuscans attacked the city of Famagusta, but the expedition ended in failure.

== Background ==
The Grand Duke of Tuscany, Ferdinando I de' Medici, had great ambitions in the Levant. Ferdinando decided to launch a conquest of Cyprus from the Ottomans, and he decided to use it as an operation base against the Ottomans. The combined Crusading rhetoric, eagerness for plundering and slaves, and Cypriot nobles who aimed to remove the Ottoman power and restore the Christian rule led the Tuscans to launch an attack on Cyprus. Ferdinando dispatched a force of 2,200 men consisting of 400 Frenchmen, 200 Maniottis, 100 Uskoks, and 100 Calabrians, and the rest were Italians. It also had 8 galleys and 9 other ships. The expedition was led by Francesco Maria del Monte. A force of 6,000 Greeks promised the Tuscans aid.

== Expedition ==
On June 24th, 1607, the Tuscans arrived in Famagusta; seeing the city was alerted by the upcoming attack, they nevertheless proceeded. The Tuscans had to disembark using oar boats since using the harbour to land was impossible, delaying the attack. The Tuscans with Petards advanced to the north-eastern section of the walls. The Ottomans fired their artillery against them but could not damage them due to them being close to the walls, which were covered by moats. However, the rocks in the moat area proved for the Tuscans difficult to march as the rocks prevented them from moving, resulting in overcrowding and finding themselves under fire from the battlements.

Another Tuscan force marched to the north; they used a petard to destroy the gate, which they succeeded in doing; however, they found that the gate was filled with barricades, which made it impassible. Some Tuscans attempted to scale the walls using the ladders, but these proved to be too short, thus ending any hope of success. Del Monte ordered the troops to retreat, which was followed by artillery fire that failed to hurt them. The Tuscans were chased by a force of 50–60 Ottoman cavalry up to their ships.

== Aftermath ==
The expedition has cost the Tuscans 21 killed and 20 wounded. The Greeks who promised to aid the Tuscans did not arrive, as the Greeks either expected a lot more men or, more likely, they did not respect the agreements made because, although they did not know in advance the extent of the Tuscan forces, they did not show up where it was previously agreed.

== Sources ==
- Michael J.K Walsh (2015), City of Empires: Ottoman and British Famagusta, Corsair Tactics and Lofty Ideals: the 1607 Tuscan Raid on Cyprus.
- David Trentacoste (2021), Grand Ducal ambitions and Venetian counter-intelligence. The Tuscan failure in the 1607 attack on Cyprus.
- Giovanni Mariti (1909), Travels in the Island of Cyprus.
