= Guillaume Durand (nephew) =

French clergyman

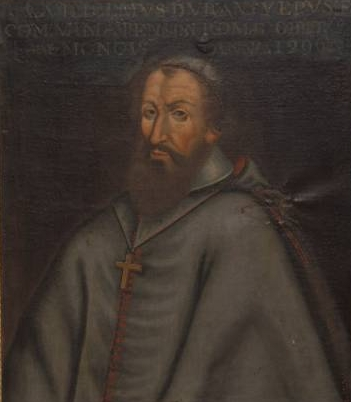
Portrait of the Bishop of Mende, Guillaume VI Durand

Guillaume Durand (died 1328 or 1330) was a French clergyman, a nephew of a more famous Guillaume Durand, nicknamed "The Speculator".

Like his uncle, he was a canonist, was rector of the University of Toulouse and succeeded his uncle as Bishop of Mende. Pope John XXII and Charles IV of France sent him on an embassy to the Sultan Orhan (1326–1360) at Brusa, to obtain more favourable conditions for the Latins in Syria. He died on the way back, in Cyprus (1328 or 1330).

== Works ==
He wrote in 1311, by command of Clement V and in connection with the Council of Vienne, De modo celebrandi concilii et corruptelis in Ecclesia reformandis, in three books. It attacks the abuses of the Church with extreme sincerity and vigour. It is a treatise on the canonical process of summoning and holding general councils, gathered from approved sources with many quotations and illustrations from the Church Fathers and from church history, together with attacks on various abuses and corruptions that were common in the fourteenth century among ecclesiastical persons. This treatise illustrates the role of traditional ideas in the formation of conciliarism, the idea that a church council could regulate the papacy. The first edition was printed at Lyons in 1531, then again at Paris by Philip Probus, a canonist of Bourges, in 1545, and dedicated to Pope Paul III as a help towards the Council of Trent. Other editions, Paris, 1671, etc.

In 1319, he wrote treatise on the recovery of the Holy Land for King Philip V, entitled Informacio brevis.
