= William of Paris =

William of Paris may refer to:

- William of Paris, an alternative name of William of Æbelholt (c. 1127 – 1203), French-born churchman of Denmark
- William of Auvergne (bishop), d. 1249, sometimes referred to as William of Paris
- William of Paris (inquisitor) confessor of Philip IV of France, made inquisitor of France in 1305
- Guillaume Boucher (fl. 1240-1254), French-born metalsmith captured by the Mongols sometimes referred to as William of Paris
