= Crusades after the fall of Acre, 1291–1399 =

Latter period of the Crusades

Crusades after Acre, 1291–1399
- Part of the Crusades
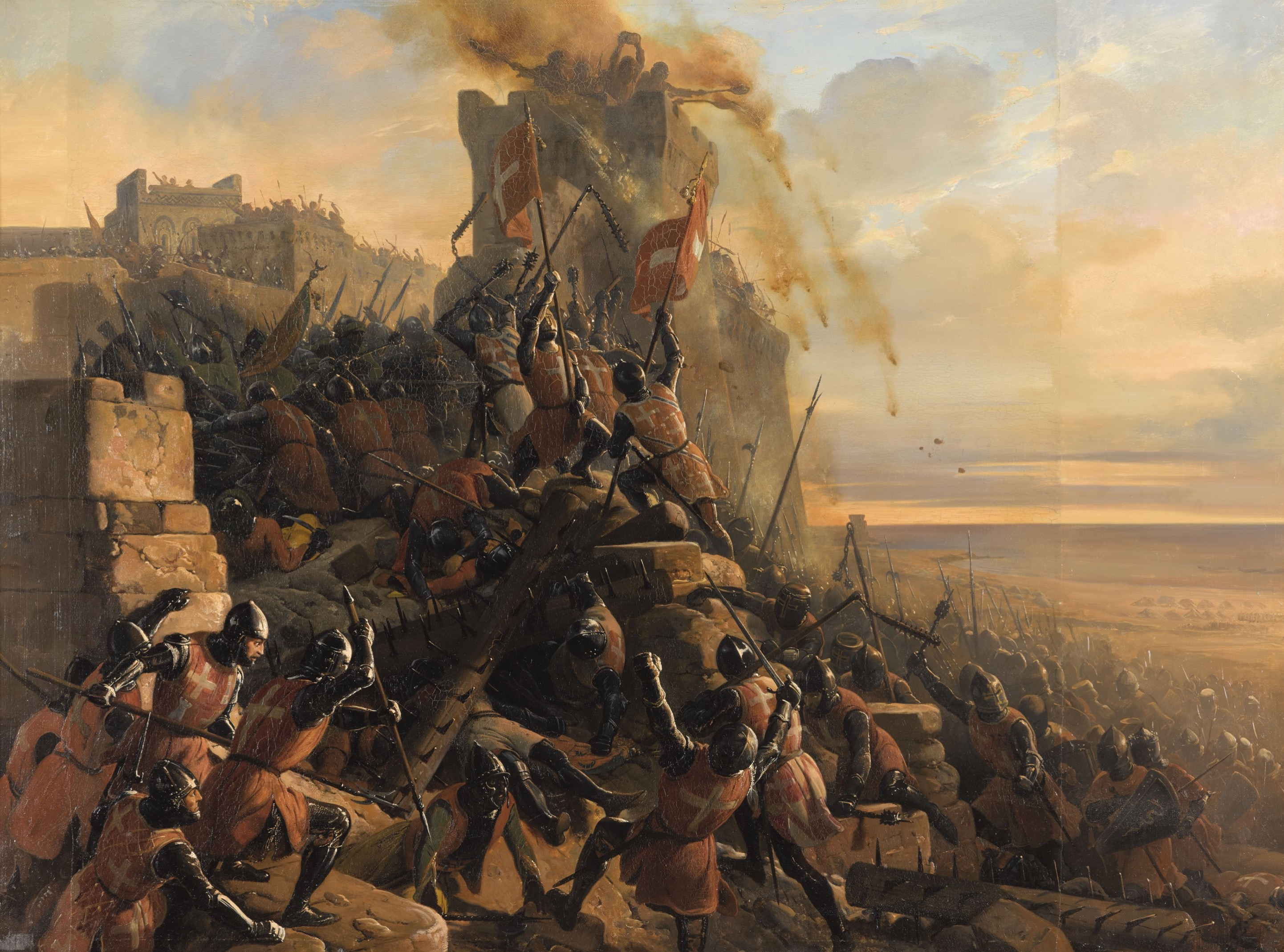
- The Hospitaller conquest of Rhodes
Date	1291–1399
Location	Levant, Baltic, Iberia, Italy, Northern Africa
Result	Rise of the Ottomans, decline of Mamluks and Mongols
Territorial changes	Hospitallers, Teutonic Knights successful, Templars destroyed

Belligerents
Cyprus (Jerusalem); Henry II; Hugh IV; Peter I Peter II; James I France; Philip IV; Louis X Philip V Charles the Fair; Philip VI; John II; England; Edward II; Edward III; Richard II; Sicily; Charles II of Anjou; Frederick III of Sicily; James II of Aragon; Holy Roman Empire; Henry VII; Louis IV; Charles IV; Sigismund; Papacy; Gregory X Nicholas IV; Boniface VIII; Benedict IX; Clement V John XXII; Clement VI; Urban V Sweden; Magnus IV; Latin East; Walter V of Brienne; Walter VI of Brienne; Louis of Burgundy; Ferdinand of Majorca; John of Gravina; Andronicus Asen; Manfred of Athens; Alfonso Fadrique; Boniface of Verona; John II Ducas	Mamluk Sultanate; Baibars; Qalawun; Sunqur al-Ashqar; Al-Ashraf Khalil; Baydara al-Mansuri; Al-Adil Kitbugha; Baibars II; An-Nasir Muhammad; Sayf al-Din Salar; Yalbugha al-Umari; An-Nasir Faraj; Ottoman Empire; Ertuğrul; Osman I Orhan; Süleyman Pasha; Murad I Lala Şahin Pasha; Savcı Bey; Bayezid I Yakub Çelebi; Çandarlızade Ali Pasha; Evrenos; Timurids; Timur; Poland; Władysław I Łokietek; Casimir III the Great; Byzantine Empire; Andronikos II Palaiologos; Michael IX Palaiologos; Andronikos III Palaiologos; Leo Kalothetos; Andronikos IV Palaiologos; John V Palaiologos; John VI Kantakouzenos; Manuel II Palaeologus; Mongol Ilkhanate; Arghun; Gaykhatu; Baydu; Ghazan; Öljaitü; Bilarghu; Abu Sa'id; Rashid al-Din Hamadani; Chupan

Commanders and leaders
Western Europe; Charles of Valois; John of Montfort; Guillaume de Nogaret; Enguerrand de Marigny; John II of Brabant; John III of Brabant; Philip III of Navarre; Odo IV of Burgundy; Gobert de Helleville; Other Nobility; Amalric of Tyre; Rupen of Montfort; Philip I of Taranto; Robert of Taranto; Charles II of Naples; Charles III of Naples; Catherine of Courtenay; Catherine of Valois; John of Bohemia; Louis I of Bourbon; Louis II of Bourbon; Martin of Aragon; Henry le Despenser; Louis I of Anjou; John of Gaunt; Louis I of Hungary; Amadeus VI of Savoy; Humbert II of Viennois; Henry of Trastámara; Italian States; Robert the Wise; Benedetto I Zaccaria; Paleologo Zaccaria; Martino Zaccaria; Benedetto II Zaccaria; Benedetto I Zaccaria; Sciarra Colonna; Pietro Zeno; Henry of Asti; Bernabò Visconti; Frederick Trogisio; Templars; Barthélemy de Quincy; Jacques de Molay; Hugues de Pairaud; Geoffroi de Charney; Hospitallers; Guillaume de Villaret; Foulques de Villaret; Maurice de Pagnac; Hélion de Villeneuve	Teutonic Knights; Albert of Schwarzburg; Konrad von Feuchtwangen; Gottfried von Hohenlohe; S. von Feuchtwangen; Werner von Orseln; Mongol Armenia; Leo II; Hethum II; Oshin; Ferrara; Azzo VIII d'Este; Matteo I Visconti; Galeazzo I Visconti; Aldobrandino II d'Este; Obizzo III d'Este; Catalan Company; Roger de Flor; Ramon Muntaner; Bernat de Rocafort; Bosnia; Vlatko Vuković; Tvrtko I Serbia; Vukašin; Uglješa; Lazar of Serbia; Vuk Branković; Miloš Obilić; Stefan Lazarević; Beyliks; Mesut Bey; Umur Bey; Ala' al-Din ibn Halin; İsfendiyar Bey; Kadi Burhan al-Din; Mircea the Elder; Other Participants; Rabban Bar Sawma; Giovanni da Montecorvino; Lucia of Tripoli; Buscarello de Ghizolfi; Andrew of Perugia; Guglielmo da Villanova; Tommaso Ugi di Siena; William of Paris; Martino Zaccaria; Francesco Dandolo; Bartolomeo Zaccaria; Guglielma Pallavicini; Antipope Clement VII; Gil de Albornoz; Hélie de Talleyrand

Popes continued to call for crusades in the century following the fall of Acre and subsequent loss of the Holy Land by the Western world in 1302. These include further plans and efforts for the recovery of the Holy Land, the later popular crusades, crusades against Christians, political crusades, the latter parts of the Reconquista, and the Northern Crusades. Crusades were to continue well into the fifteenth century and would include those against the Ottoman Empire.

== The end of Outremer ==
When the Eighth Crusade ended in 1270, the Mamluks were free to continue to assert complete control over Syria and Palestine. The Frankish fortresses soon fell, and the last major expedition of Lord Edward's Crusade failed to free Jerusalem. Mamluk sultan Baibars had defeated the Crusaders and continued his quest to drive the Franks from the Holy Land. At the Second Council of Lyon in 1274, Gregory X preached a new crusade to an assembly which included envoys from both the Byzantine emperor Michael VIII Palaiologos and the Mongol Ilkhan Abaqa, as well as from the princes of the West. Many among the Western nobility took the cross. But Gregory X died on 10 January 1276, and there was to be no crusade.

Because of civil strife throughout Europe and the Crusader states, Baibars was able to pursue his ambitions without the threat of Western intervention. He led a raid into Armenian Cilicia, sacking the cities of the plain and later invading the Seljuk Sultanate of Rûm. He did not long survive his Anatolian invasion, dying in Damascus on 1 July 1277. As he was the greatest enemy to Christendom since Saladin, there was rejoicing throughout the Holy Land and Europe at the news of his death. His successor was an emir named al-Mansûr Qalawun who would soon turn his attention from intrigue in Cairo to attack the Franks.

Henry II of Cyprus was crowned King of Jerusalem in Tyre on 15 August 1286, but soon returned to Cyprus. His brother Amalric of Tyre remained as constable. Amalric overthrew his brother on 26 April 1306, but was murdered on 5 June 1310. After a brief interlude, Henry was restored to power and served until 1324.

Open warfare began off the Syrian coast between the Pisans and the Genoese. The Grand Masters Jean de Villiers and Guillaume de Beaujeu brokered a tentative peace to allow free passage for shipping. Lattakieh had not been impacted by this conflict but Syrian merchants had been complaining to Qalawun about sending their goods to a Christian port. Lattakieh was the last remnant of the Principality of Antioch and was not covered by the truce signed after the Siege of Tripoli. Qalawun attacked the town and on 20 April 1287, the garrison surrendered, with no relief coming from Christian forces in the area.

The death of Gregory X resulted in a series of popes––Innocent V, Adrian V, John XXI, Nicholas III, Martin IV, Honorius IV––that were never able to mount an expedition to the East. When the lengthy 1287–1288 Papal Election concluded, Nicholas IV became the new pontiff on 22 February 1288 and immediately wanted to begin a new crusade. In the meantime, Qalawun looked at the situation in Tripoli as an excuse to break his truce with Tripoli and would soon move his army into Syria.

=== Situation in Europe ===
With a new pope calling for a crusade and the Mamluk sultan threatening Outremer, the situation was dire. Among the European royalty, only France was actively pursuing various crusades after Acre. This situation would change some but not significantly over the next few decades.

==== England ====
Edward I of England was supportive of a crusade but engaged in more pressing matters. His foray as a prince and crusader of 1271–1272 was actually one of the most successful of the crusades to the Holy Land but could not stop the Mamluks' driving the Franks out. He died on 7 July 1307 and was succeeded by his son Edward II of England. In 1313, Edward II and his wife Isabella of France traveled to Paris to visit her father Philip IV of France, hoping to resolve the Gascony issue then being negotiated by Aymer de Valence. Among other things, this trip resulted in a public declaration that both kings and their queens would join a crusade to the Holy Land. The Parliament of 1327 forced the king to abdicate in favor of his son Edward III of England who would later claim the throne of France.

==== Germany and the Holy Roman Empire ====
Rudolf I of Germany had taken the cross more than a decade before and was similarly occupied with local intrigue. He died on 15 July 1291 and was succeeded by his eldest son Albert I of Germany who had a reign unmarked by accomplishments, dying on 1 May 1308. As king of Germany, Albert was succeeded by Henry VII of Luxembourg, the first of the House of Luxembourg. Henry VII was also elected Holy Roman Emperor, the first since the death of Frederick II in 1250. This ended the Great Interregnum of the empire and in July 1309, Clement V confirmed Henry's election. He agreed to personally crown Henry emperor in December 1312 in exchange for Henry's oath of protection to the pope, his agreement to defend the rights and not attack the privileges of the cities of the Papal States, and to go on crusade once he had been crowned emperor.

==== France ====
Philip IV of France became king on 5 October 1285 and would serve until his death on 29 November 1314. Among the European monarchs, he alone remained interested in crusades to the Holy Land. Towards that end, he was pursuing a Franco-Mongol alliance with Arghun, ruler of the Mongol Ilkhanate in Baghdad. Arghun was seeking to join forces between the Mongols and the Europeans against their common enemy, the Muslim Mamluks. Arghun offered to return Jerusalem to the Christians once it was re-captured from the Muslims. Philip seemingly responded positively to the request of the embassy by sending one of his noblemen, Gobert de Helleville, to accompany Mongol ambassador Rabban Bar Ṣawma back to Mongol lands. There was further correspondence between Arghun and Philip in 1288 and 1289, outlining potential military cooperation. However, Philip never actually pursued such military plans.

=== The Mediterranean ===
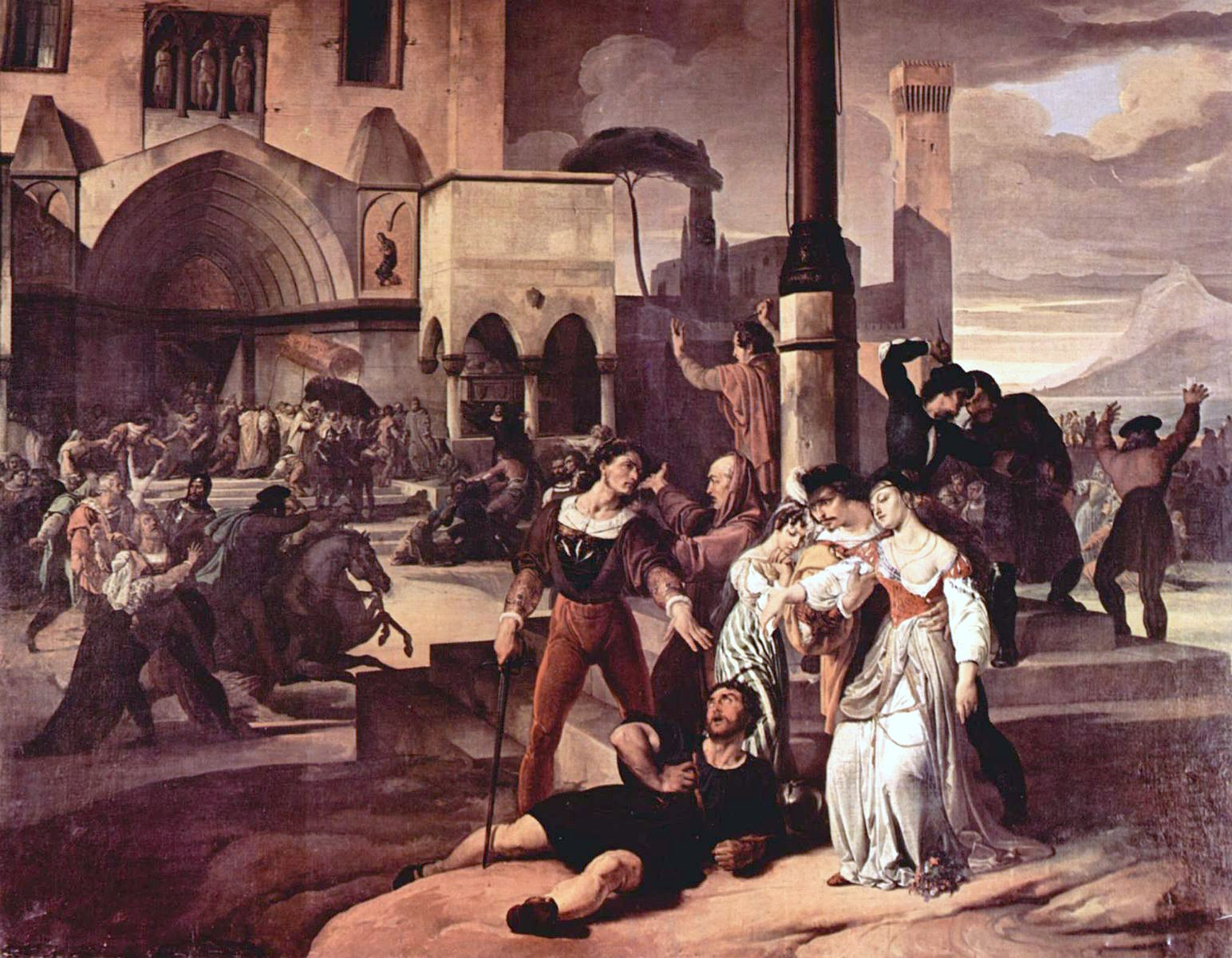
A scene of the Sicilian Vesper by Francesco Hayez

A crusade was declared by Martin IV against Peter III of Aragon in 1284. The pope also deposed him as king and bestowed Aragon on Peter's nephew Charles of Valois, son of Philip III of France. This was part of the larger War of the Sicilian Vespers which had begun in 1282.

==== War of Curzola ====
The War of Curzola was fought in 1295–1299 between Venice and Genoa. both looking for ways to increase their dominance in the Eastern Mediterranean and Black Seas. Following the expiration of a truce between the republics, Genoese ships continually harassed Venetian merchants in the Aegean Sea. In 1295, Genoese raids on the Venetian quarter in Constantinople further escalated the tensions, resulting in a formal declaration of war by the Venetians in the same year. The Byzantines entered the war on the Genoan side. While the Venetians made some advances, the Genoans exercised dominance throughout the war, finally defeating the Venetians at the Battle of Curzola in 1298, with a truce being signed the next year.

==== Aragonese Crusade ====
Charles of Valois, brother to the king of France, would try in vain for a crown. Thanks to the Aragonese Crusade undertaken by his father, against the advice of his brother, he believed he would win a kingdom but won nothing but ridicule. In 1301, Charles married Catherine of Courtenay, titular Empress of Constantinople, but he was lost in the complexity of Italian politics. He would eventually play a role in later crusades. Catherine died on 11 October 1307 and their daughter Catherine of Valois succeeded her as titular empress.

==== Charles II of Anjou ====
The War of the Sicilian Vespers had begun when Charles I of Anjou ruled the Kingdom of Sicily, and was still raging when he died on 7 January 1285. He was succeeded by his son Charles II of Anjou on the mainland as King of Naples and, after some interim rulers, Frederick II of Sicily on the island itself. Because of his father's dealings with Maria of Antioch, Charles II also laid claim to the crown of Jerusalem. The Battle of La Falconara was fought on 1 December 1299, in the latter days of the war, between the forces of Frederick II of Sicily and Philip I of Taranto, the son of Charles II. It was a momentous victory for Frederick and a disaster for Philip, who was captured. He was held until the signing of the Peace of Caltabellotta in 1302 that terminated the war. Charles II died on 5 May 1309 and was succeeded by his son Robert the Wise.

=== Crusade of Nicholas IV ===
One of Nicholas' first actions as pope was to receive the Mongol ambassador Bar Ṣawma who, with Gobert de Helleville, left Rome in the late spring of 1288 with letters in support of a crusade to the Ilkhan court. The letters were vague and the pope unable to promise a definite date for any action. In 1289, Nicholas dispatched the Franciscan Giovanni da Montecorvino as papal legate to Kubilai Khan, Arghun, and other leading personages of the Mongol Empire.

A year after Nicholas assumed the papacy, Mamluk sultan Qalawun stuck at the Franks, causing the Fall of Tripoli in April 1289. Within days, Henry II of Cyprus came to Acre where he met with an envoy from Qalawun. Despite the attack on Tripoli, their 1283 truce was renewed, covering of Jerusalem and Cyprus for another ten years, ten months and ten days. Lucia of Tripoli and Leo II of Armenia soon joined the pact. Henry had little faith in Qalawun's word, but could not appeal to the Mongols as that would be breach of the truce. He returned to Cyprus in September, sending Jean I de Grailly west to impress upon the Europeans how desperate the situation was.

The West was shocked by the loss of Tripoli and the pope revived the plans for a crusade started by Gregory X that had never been totally abandoned. On 10 February 1290, he proclaimed a crusade with an objective of the total liberation of the Holy Land and support to the places at present held by Christians. The crusade was preached everywhere, including in the Holy Land. For those who took the Cross, the force against the clergy, support to the Sicilians, or visiting the Holy Sepulchre despite pontifical prohibition were sins that were absolved. All trade with the sultan, including pilgrimages, was prohibited. The departure date for the crusade was set at 24 June 1293.

The truce between Henry II and Qalawun had restored the peace at Acre. By summer of 1290, the merchants of Damascus were again sending their caravans to the coast and Acre was bustling. In August, crusaders from Italy arrived and immediately began causing trouble. Their commanders had no control over them. They had come to fight the infidel and began to attack the Muslim merchants and citizens. At the end of August, a riot flared and they began randomly killing Muslims. Deciding that every man with a beard was a Muslim, many Christians were also attacked. All that the authorities could do was do was to rescue a few of the Muslims and take them to the safety of the castle. The ringleaders were arrested, but the damage was done. Vowing to kill every Christian in Acre, Qalawun led his army from Cairo, but fell ill and died on 10 November 1290. He was succeeded by his son, al-Ashraf Khalil.

=== Fall of Acre ===
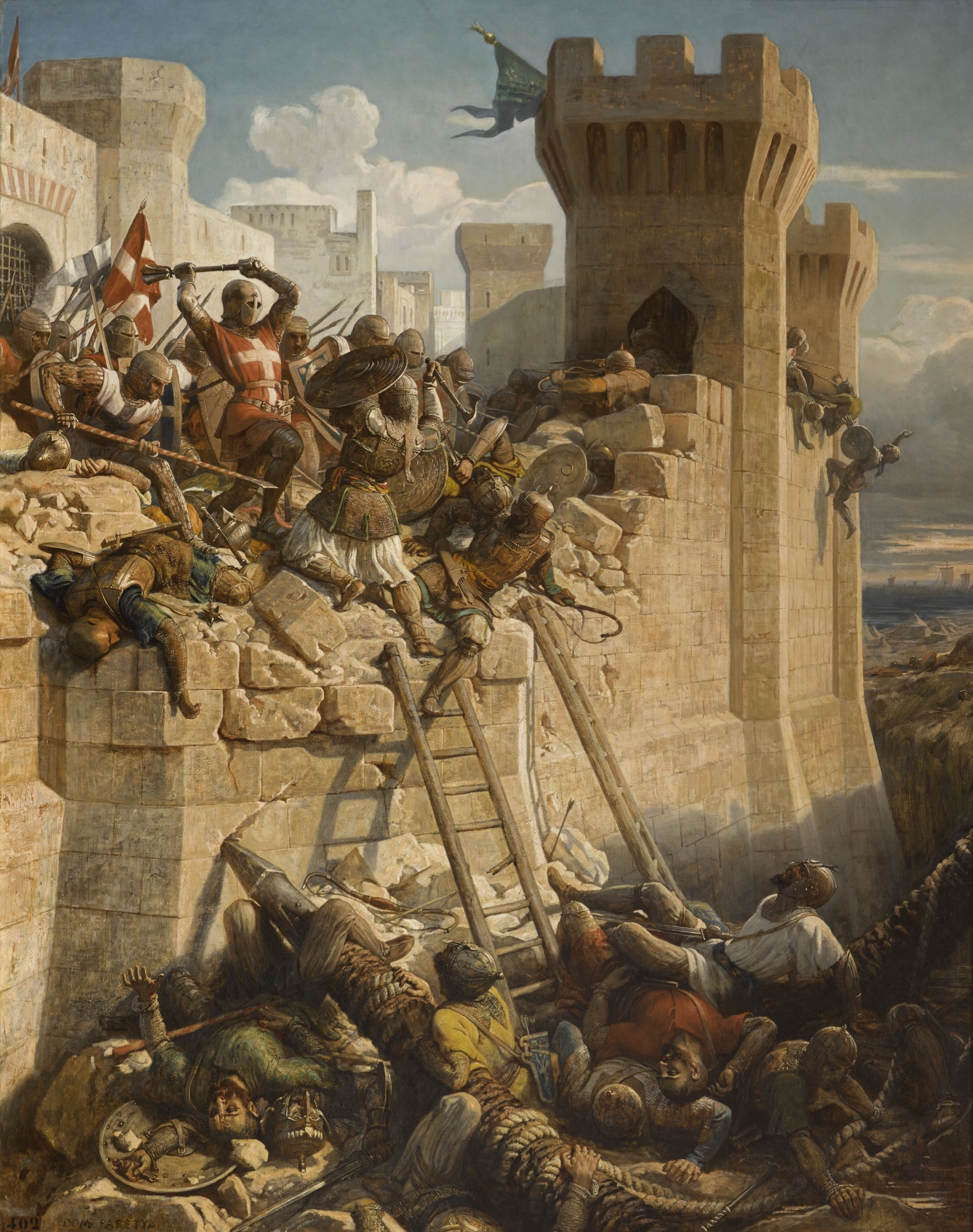
Matthieu de Clermont défend Ptolémaïs en 1291 by Dominique Papety.

Because of the weather, the Khalil's attack on the remaining Christians in the Holy Land was delayed. Finally, he set out from Cairo and on 5 April 1291, the Siege of Acre began. By 18 May, the walls of the city were breached and the Franks made a desperate stand to contain the incursion. The sack of the city soon began, with hundreds slaughtered as the Mamluks surged in. Desperate Franks tried to escape in any remaining boats. Some got away, including Henry II and Amalric, later accused of cowardice. Many took refuge in the fortified compounds of the Military Orders, holding out for days. The Templar citadel collapsed on 28 May, killing the knights within. Those under the Hospitallers' protection were promised safe conduct, only to be led out of the city to be slaughtered.

The fall of Acre was a fatal blow to the Latin Christians of Outremer. For the Muslims, the victory at Acre affirmed their faith's dominance over Christianity and their triumph in the war for the Holy Land. The siege of Acre was depicted in a painting displayed in the Salles des Croisades (Hall of Crusades) at the Palace of Versailles. The painting, Matthieu de Clermont défend Ptolémaïs en 1291, by French artist Dominique Papety (1815–1849) is displayed in the fourth room of the hall. Note that nineteenth century historians frequently referred to Acre as Ptolémaïs.

=== Decline of Byzantium ===
The Reconquest of Constantinople in 1261 led to a short-lived revival of Byzantine fortunes under Michael VIII Palaiologos, but the empire was ill-equipped to deal with the enemies that surrounded it. Rather than holding on to his possessions in Asia Minor, Michael chose to expand the empire, gaining only short-term successes. To avoid another sacking of the capital by the Latins, he forced the Church to submit to Rome. The former states of Frankokratia were also occupied in various local intrigues. Michael VIII's son Andronikos II Palaiologos became sole emperor in 1282 and would serve until 1328. His efforts, continued by his successors, marked the empire's last genuine attempts in restoring its former glory. The reign of Andronikos II has been described as turning Byzantium in to a second-rate power. The first Byzantine civil war fought from 1321–1328 between Andronikos II and his grandson Andronikos III Palaiologos would further contribute to the decline of the empire.

The Byzantine Empire in the late 13th century

==== Rise of the Ottomans ====
With the demise of the Seljuks, Anatolia was divided into a patchwork of independent states called the Anatolian beyliks. One of these beyliks was led by Osman I around the town Eskişehir in western Anatolia. He had succeeded his father Ertuğrul as sultan around 1281 and extended his domain, which would become the Ottoman Empire, toward the edge of Byzantium. His first major victory was at the Battle of Bapheus on 27 July 1302, which was the beginning of the Byzantine-Ottoman Wars.

==== Catalan Company ====
In order to counter the beyliks' increasing power, Andronikos turned to mercenaries. The signing of the Peace of Caltabellotta in 1302 terminated the War of the Sicilian Vespers, leaving an Iberian fighting force, the almogavars, without immediate employment. James II of Aragon and his brother Frederick III of Sicily saw them as a threat to civil order. While some remained for the defense of Sicily, many of them were recruited into the Catalan Company, led by Italian condottiere and adventurer Roger de Flor, to be paid in Byzantine service.

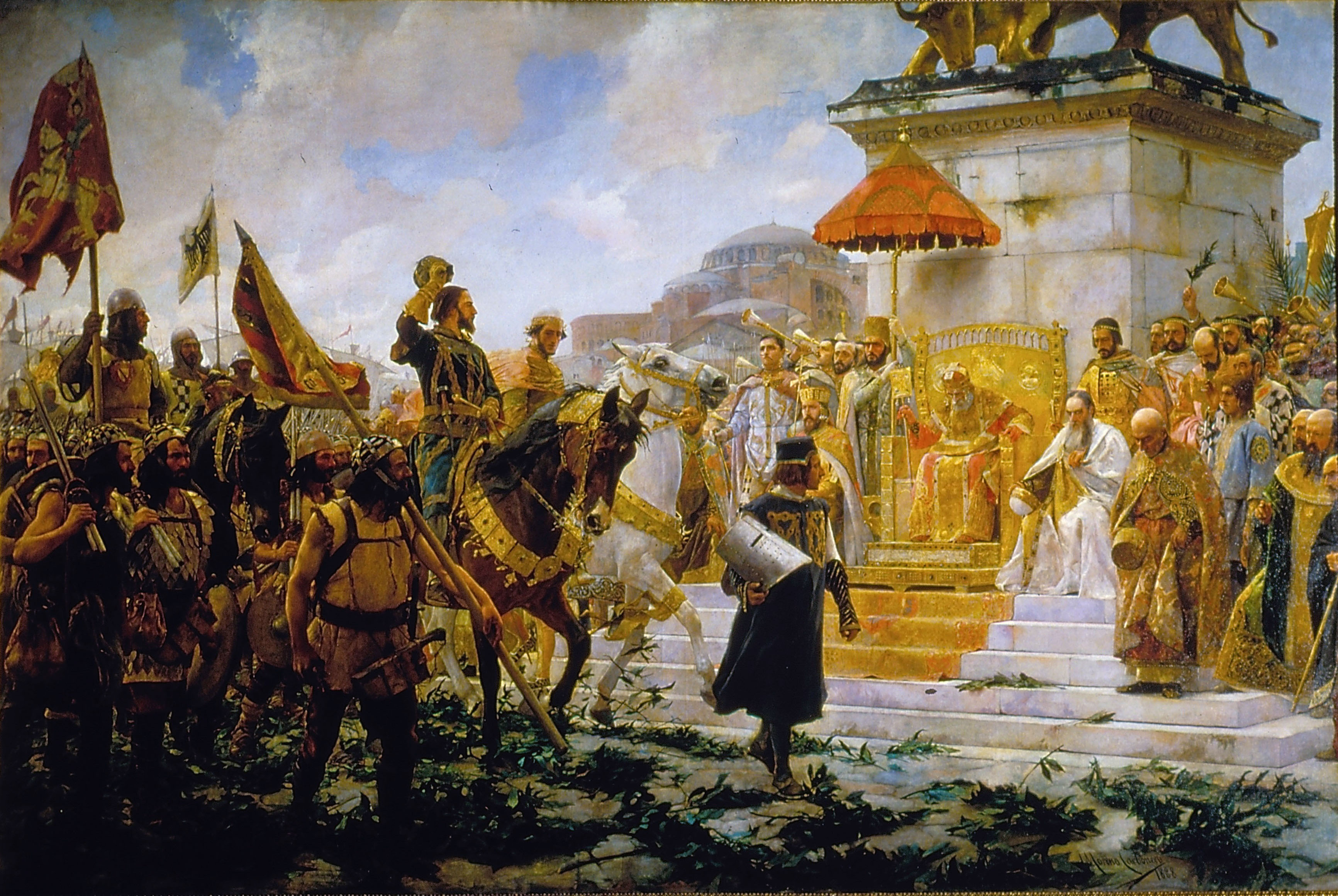
Entry of Roger de Flor in Constantinople by José Moreno Carbonero

The defeat at Bapheus was turned around with a Catalan victory that pitted the empire's mercenary Catalans against the Karasid Turks in the Battle of the Cyzicus in October 1303. The subsequent campaigns in Anatolia caused the Catalans to be seen as a growing danger. On 30 April 1305, Roger de Flor was murdered on the orders of co-emperor Michael IX Palaiologos. At the same time, orders to exterminate the company at a banquet organized by the emperor resulted in the loss of over 1000 men. The local population rose up against the Catalans in Constantinople and Michael IX ensured that as many as possible were killed before news reached the main force in Gallipoli. Some however escaped and carried the news of the massacre to Gallipoli. The Catalans then went on a killing spree of their own, killing all the local Byzantines.

The Catalans, under the command of Ramon Muntaner and Bernat de Rocafort, got their revenge at the Siege of Gallipoli on 21 June 1305, followed shortly by the Battle of Apros in July 1305. The Catalans proceeded to ravage the region for two years, before moving west to conquer the Duchy of Athens at the Battle of Halmyros on 15 March 1311. This resulted in the death of Walter V of Brienne.

==== Lordship of Chios ====
In 1304, the Genoese noble Benedetto I Zaccaria captured the Byzantine island of Chios and established the Lordship of Chios. He justified this to the Byzantine court as necessary to prevent the island's capture by Turkish pirates, and it was granted as fait accompli. Benedetto died in 1307 and was succeeded first by his son Paleologo Zaccaria and then to the next generation Martino Zaccaria and Benedetto II Zaccaria. Martino made it the core of a small realm encompassing several nearby islands including Samos and Kos.

In 1328, Andronikos III Palaiologos succeeded his grandfather as emperor and was approached by nobleman Leo Kalothetos who proposed a reconquest of the island. Andronikos III agreed, and sailed with a large fleet against him. Chios returned to Byzantine control, with Kalothetos as the provincial governor. It remained so until 1346, when it was lost during the second Byzantine civil war of 1341–1347. The island then became the seat of the Maona of Chios and Phocaea.

==== Beylik of Menteshe ====
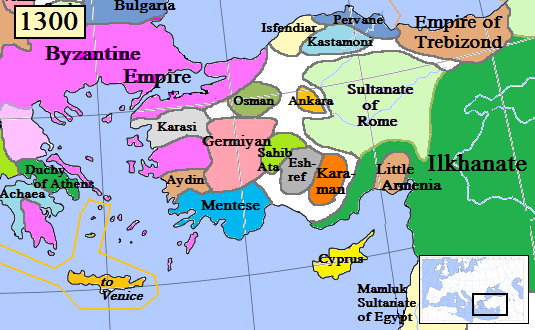
Anatolia in 1300

Menteshe was the first of the Anatolian beyliks founded after the decline of the Seljuks in the late 13th century. The founder's son Mesut Bey ruled until his death in 1319 and built the beylik into one of the great regional naval powers of their time. As the first seafaring beylik, they were known as the Sea Turks. The town of Aydın was captured by the Menteshe from the Byzantines in 1284. The city suffered extensive destruction, with much of its inhabitants massacred and over 20,000 inhabitants sold off as slaves. The Menteshe captured the port town of Ephesus on 24 October 1304. Contrary to the terms of the surrender, the Turks pillaged the Church of Saint John and deported most of the local population to Thyrea when a Byzantium-friendly revolt seemed probable. During these events many of the remaining inhabitants were massacred.

=== Aftermath: the Holy Land ===
The remaining Frankish cities soon met the same fate as Acre and Christian resistance in the Holy Land vanished. Within a month, the last outposts at Tyre, Beirut and Sidon had been abandoned by the Franks. The Mamluks ravaged the coastal lands, destroying anything of value to the Franks should they ever attempt another attack. Embittered by the long religious wars, the victorious Muslims had no mercy for the Christians. The Franks' reign over Outremer was over.

The Mamluks occupied Haifa without opposition on 30 July 1291 and destroyed the monasteries on Mount Carmel and slew their friars. There remained two Templar castles in the region, but neither was strong enough to withstand the Mamluks. Tortosa was evacuated on 3 August and Château Pèlerin on the 14 August. Templar Grand Master Jacques de Molay continued to appeal to the West for troops and supplies to fortify the island. In November 1301, the Syrian island of Ruad was granted to the Templars, where they strengthened its fortifications, and installed a small force as a permanent garrison. They were under the command of the marshal Barthélemy de Quincy. Plans for combined operations between the Franks and the Mongols were made for the winters of 1301 and 1302.

In 1302, the Mamluks sent a fleet to Tripoli where they began the Siege of Ruad. The Templars fought hard against the invaders, but were eventually starved out. The Cypriots began assembling a fleet to rescue Ruad, but it arrived too late. The Templars surrendered on 26 September 1302, with they understanding that they could depart unharmed. However, most were executed, and the surviving Templar knights were taken as prisoners to Cairo, eventually dying of starvation after years of ill treatment.

== Mamluks ==
The Mamluk sultan Baibars had been the scourge of the Christians throughout the later years of the Crusades and was the undisputed leader of the Muslim world. After the Siege of Baghdad in 1258, Cairo became the center of Islamic culture but lacked a caliph, the supreme religious leader. In 1261, al-Hakim I was promoted to the post, beginning the long line of Abbasid Caliphs of Cairo. When Baibars died on 1 July 1277, he was succeeded by his ill-prepared sons. By November 1279, the sultanate was assumed by al-Mansûr Qalawun, an emir whose daughter was married to Baibars' eldest son, al-Said Barakah. Qalawun engaged in both diplomacy and warfare with the Franks, with the ultimate goal of driving them out of the Holy Land. In 1280, Qalawun identified his eldest son as-Salih Ali as his heir apparent, and as-Salih's name began to be included with Qalawun's in treaties. When as-Salih Ali died in 1288, Qalawun appointed his next son al-Ashraf Khalil as his co-sultan. Khalil's name was read alongside Qalawun's name in the khutba and the emirs swore their allegiance to him. However, Qalawun did not sign the diploma of investiture confirming Khalil's appointment. The reason for Qalawun's hesitation is not clear, but may have considered his son unsuitable for the sultanate or was wary of the enmity the viceroy Husam ad-Din Turuntay, a strong ally of as-Salih Ali.

=== Al-Ashraf Khalil ===
Qalawun died on 10 November 1290 and was succeeded al-Ashraf Khalil two days later. In the royal procession that followed Khalil's accession to the throne, he was the target of an unsuccessful assassination attempt by his viceroy Turuntay. Turuntay was imprisoned in the Cairo Citadel, tortured and put to death shortly thereafter. Qalawun was buried two months later, the delay being caused either as a precaution to ensure his smooth succession or to wait until Qalawun's mausoleum was completed. Khalil co-opted his father's Mansuriyya, the most powerful mamluk regiment in the sultanate, by absorbing them into his Circassian corps, the Ashrafiyya.

Khalil was a strong leader like his predecessors but was disliked by many of the emirs. He started his reign by imprisoning some prominent emirs of his father, including Turuntay, Sunqur al-Ashqar and Hosam ad-Din Lajin, executing the first two. On 14 December 1293, he was assassinated by his viceroy Baydara al-Mansuri, who then proclaimed himself sultan. His reign was short-lived and was killed by the emirs al-Adil Kitbugha (a Mongol who had served in the army of Hulagu) and Baibars II al-Jashnikir, and his head was sent to Cairo. Lajin, also a future sultan, had participated in the plot, but fled before he was captured.

=== Al-Nasir Muhammad ===
Khalil was succeeded by his 9-year old brother al-Nasir Muhammad who served three non-contiguous reigns from 1293–1341. In his first reign, he served under the regency of Kitbugha. In 1294, Kitbugha deposed his young charge and became sultan, with Lajin as his viceroy. In 1296, Lajin attempted to assassinate the sultan but failed. Kitbugha feared for his life and removed himself from the sultanate, and Lajin became sultan. Lajin was murdered in 1299 by a group of emirs that including Baibars II and decided to return al-Nasir Muhammad to the sultanate. At 14 years of age, he was restored as sultan with Sayf al-Din Salar, an Oirat Mongol, as vice sultan and Baibars II, a Circassian, as ostadar (supervisor of the royal kitchen).

The second reign of al-Nasir Muhammad was from January 1299 – March 1309 and was characterized by two major battles with the Mongols. In the Battle of Wadi al-Khazandar (Third Battle of Homs) in late December 1299, the Mamluk army was defeated by the Mongols, but it was not decisive. Three years later, the Battle of Marj al-Saffar in April 1303 was a disastrous defeat for the Mongols, putting an end to the Mongol invasions of the Levant. By 1309, the sultan was no longer willing to be dominated by his deputies and informed them that he planned a Hajj. Instead, he went to al-Karak and began building alliances within the Levant. In his absence, Baibars II installed himself as sultan with Salar as his deputy.

The rule of Baibars II lasted barely ten months. The people hated him and demanded the return of an-Nasir Muhammad, initiating his third reign. In March 1310, he was again sultan and Baibars II was soon executed. Salar was later arrested and died in prison. In 1310, an attempt was made to replace the sultan with his nephew, but the plot was discovered and conspirators punished. These plots contributed to the sultan's suspicious nature, demonstrated by his eventual exiling the caliph al-Mustakfi I to Qus. During the third reign, Egypt suffered from few external threats, as both the Franks and Mongols had been weakened by losses in battle and their internal conflicts. As Egypt's political power grew, foreign delegations visited Cairo frequently seeking help and cultivating friendship. Among these visits were envoys from John XXII, arriving in June 1327 pleading to protect the Christian holy places and to stop his attacks against Sis. In February 1330, Philip VI of France sent a delegation who appealed to an-Nasir Muhammad to grant their king Jerusalem and her surrounding areas. The delegation was rebuffed and ordered to leave Egypt.

=== Later Mamluk sultans ===
The Mamluk sultans after al-Nasir Muhammad were first his sons and then his grandsons. This was followed by the Burji dynasty in which the Circassians dominated, beginning with Sayf ad-Din Barquq from 1382–1399 and his son al-Nasir Faraj thereafter.

Mamluk Sultans after al-Nasir Muhammad
Name	Tenure
al-Mansur Abu Bakr	1341
al-Ashraf Kujuk	1341–1342
an-Nasir Ahmad	1342
as-Salih Ismail	1342–1345
al-Kamil Sha'ban	1345–1346
al-Muzaffar Hajji	1346–1347
al-Nasir Hasan	1347–1351
as-Salih Salih	1351–1354
al-Nasir Hasan, second reign	1355–1361
al-Mansur Muhammad	1361–1363
al-Ashraf Nasir ad-Din Shaban	1363–1377
al-Mansur Ala-ad-Din Ali	1377–1381
as-Salih Hajji	1381–1382
Barquq, first of the Burji dynasty	1382–1399
an-Nasir Faraj	1399–1405

== Mongols ==
Arghun died a month before the loss of Acre and was followed in rapid succession by his half-brother Gaykhatu and then cousin Baydu. The successors to the Ilkhanate would suffer eventual defeat at the hands of the Mamluks and fade from the Holy Land without the coveted Franco-Mongol alliance. Histories of the Mongols written in this period include the Histoire Secrète des Mongols and Jāmiʿ al-Tawārīkh.

=== Ghazan ===
Stability was restored to the Ilkhanate when Arghun's son Ghazan took power in 1295, who converted to Islam to secure cooperation from other influential Mongols. Despite being a Muslim, Ghazan maintained good relations with his Christian vassal states including Ilkhanid Armenia and Georgia. Ghazan was praised by contemporaries including George Pachymeres for his bravery and virtue, and even his piety.

In 1299, Ghazan made the first of three attempts to invade Syria. As he launched his invasion, he sent letters to Henry II of Cyprus and the Grand Masters of the military orders inviting them to join him in his attack on the Mamluks in Syria. The Mongols successfully first took the city of Aleppo, and were there joined by their vassal Hethum II of Armenia whose forces participated in the rest of the offensive. The Mongols soundly defeated the Mamluks at the Battle of Wadi al-Khazandar on 23 December 1299. The success in Syria led to rumors in Europe that the Mongols had successfully recaptured the Holy Land, but Jerusalem had been neither taken nor even besieged. There were some Mongol raids into Palestine in early 1300 going as far as Gaza. When the Egyptians advanced from Cairo in May 1300, the Mongols retreated without resistance.

=== Öljaitü ===
In 1303, the Mongols suffered a crushing defeat at the Battle of Marj al-Saffar, which marked the end of their incursions into Syria. Ghazan died on 11 May 1304 and was succeeded by his brother Öljaitü. In April 1305, Öljaitü sent an embassy led by Buscarello de Ghizolfi to the pope and the kings of England and France in hopes of finally concluding a Franco-Mongol alliance. The West discussed a crusade, but nothing came of these talks. A memorandum drafted by the Hospitaller master Guillaume de Villaret concerning military plans for a crusade envisaged a Mongol invasion of Syria as a preliminary to a Western intervention by 1308.

Hethum II abdicated sometime after 1303, leaving the throne to his sixteen-year-old nephew Leo III of Armenia. Retiring as a Franciscan friar, Hethum emerged in 1305 from his monastic cell to help Leo defend Cilicia from a Mamluk raiding party, which was defeated in a mountain pass near Baghras. On 17 November 1307, both the current and former kings of Armenia met with Bilarghu, the Mongol representative in Cilicia, at his camp just outside Anazarba. Bilarghu, a recent convert to Islam, had sought to build a mosque in the capital city of Sis, but Hethum had blocked the move. Bilarghu murdered the entire Armenian party. Oshin of Armenia, brother of Hethum, immediately marched against Bilarghu to retaliate and vanquished him, forcing him to leave Cilicia. Bilarghu was executed for his crimes at the request of the Armenians. Oshin was crowned the new king of Cilician Armenia upon his return to Tarsus.

In 1312, Öljaitü decided to cross the Euphrates to attack the Mamluks. He laid siege to the heavily fortified town of Rahbat. After a month of fighting in which they suffered heavy casualties, the Mongols ultimately failed to take the town and withdrew due to the summer heat. This was to be the last major Mongol incursion into the Levant.

=== Abu Sa'id ===
Öljaitü died on 17 December 1316, having reigned for over twelve years. Physician and statesman Rashid al-Din Hamadani had served as vizier for both Ghazan and Öljaitü, and was accused of having caused his death by poisoning. He was executed in 1318, but fortunately his Jāmiʿ al-Tawārīkh (Compendium of Chronicles) survived to provide a concise history of the Mongols. Öljaitü was succeeded by his son Abu Sa'id.

Abu Sa'id signed a commercial treaty with Venice in 1320, while also granting them to establish oratories throughout the empire. However, a final settlement with the Mamluks would only be found with the Treaty of Aleppo in 1323. Following the progressive conversion of the Ilkhanate to Islam, the Mongols finally were amenable to ceasing hostilities. Abu Sa'id was following the advice of his custodian Chupan when the treaty with the Mamluks was finally ratified. Following the treaty and a period of peace, the Ilkhanate further disintegrated, and effectively disappeared in the latter part of the 14th century.

== The Papacy, 1292–1314 ==
The loss of Acre was accompanied by significant changes in the Catholic Church and the trials of the Templars. The latter event would eliminate the Templars as a fighting force but see the rise of Hospitaller Rhodes.

=== Boniface VIII ===
Nicholas IV died on 4 April 1292, effectively ending the efforts towards any combined action in the Holy Land with the Mongols. Nicholas was succeeded by Celestine V after the 1292–1294 Papal Election. He resigning five months later and was succeeded by Boniface VIII who would serve as pope from 1294–1303. The papacy of Boniface was relatively uneventful, but he did oversee the Peace of Caltabellotta in 1302, and to prepare for a crusade, ordered an end to the Venetian-Genoese war. Nevertheless, they fought for three more years, and turned down his offer to mediate peace. He issued the bull Clericis laicos on 5 February 1296 which attempted to prevent the secular states of Europe from appropriating church revenues without the express prior permission of the pope. He also clashed with his enemy Philip IV of France, issuing the bull Ausculta Fili in December 1301, followed by Unam sanctam eleven months later.

In 1300, Guillaume de Nogaret, the Keeper of the Seal of France, was sent as embassy to Boniface. Three years later, he concocted a plan to kidnap the pope and on 12 March 1303 read a long series of accusations against Boniface, including black magic, sodomy, heresy and blasphemy, demanding that he be tried. In response, Boniface announced that he intended to place the kingdom of France under interdict. In September 1303, Guillaume de Nogaret and Sciarra Colonna led a force of 1600 men to arrest Boniface at his birthplace of Anagni. While the two managed to apprehend the pope, Sciarra reportedly slapped the pope in the face in the process, which was accordingly dubbed the Schiaffo di Anagni. The attempt eventually failed after a few days when locals freed the pope. Boniface VIII died on 11 October 1303, and France would dominate his weaker successors for years.

=== Benedict XI ===
Boniface VIII was succeeded by Benedict XI on 22 October 1303. The election of the timid Benedict was the beginning of the triumph of France that lasted through 1376. He was quick to release Philip IV from the excommunication that had been put upon him by Boniface. Benedict also arranged an armistice between Philip and Edward I of England. Early in 1304, Guillaume de Nogaret reported his activities to Philip, and was rewarded by gifts of land and money. He was then sent with an embassy to Benedict to demand absolution for all concerned in the struggle with Boniface. Benedict refused to meet Nogaret and, on 7 June 1304, issued the bull Flagitiosum scelus excommunicating him. Nogaret replied with apologies for his conduct, and when Benedict died on 7 July 1304, Nogaret pointed to his death as a witness to the justice of his cause.

=== Clement V ===
After the protracted 1304–1305 Papal Conclave, the period known as the Avignon Papacy was initiated under Clement V, beginning on 5 June 1305. Among his first actions were to explain away those features of the Clericis Laicos that might apply to Philip IV and withdrew Unam sanctam. Looking forward, Clement sent letters to both the Templar Grand Master Jacques de Molay and the Hospitaller Grand Master Foulques de Villaret to discuss the possibility of merging the two orders. Neither was amenable to the idea, but the proposal would soon be moot.

==== Charges of heresy against Boniface VIII ====
The lawyers representing Philip IV pressed to reopen Guillaume de Nogaret's charges of heresy against the late Boniface VIII that had circulated in the pamphlet war around the bull Unam sanctam. Clement V had to yield to pressures for this trial which was begun on 2 February 1309 and lasted for two years. In the document that called for witnesses, Clement V expressed both his personal conviction of the innocence of Boniface VIII and his resolution to satisfy the king. Finally, in February 1311, Philip IV wrote to Clement V abandoning the process to the future Council of Vienne. For his part, Clement V absolved all the participants in the abduction of Boniface at Anagni.

==== Franco-Mongol dealings ====
The Franciscan Giovanni da Montecorvino had been dispatched in 1289 as papal legate to the Mongol Empire and he submitted letters on 8 January 1305 and 13 February 1306 describing the progress of the Latin mission in the Far East. In 1307, Clement V, pleased with his success, sent a delegation led by Andrew of Perugia and Guglielmo da Villanova to consecrate him as Archbishop of Peking. Again in search of a Franco-Mongol alliance, a Mongol embassy led by Tommaso Ugi di Siena reached European monarchs that same year but no coordinated military action was forthcoming.

==== La Flor des Estoires d'Orient ====
In Mongol Armenia, the assassination of the Armenian leaders Hethum II and Leo III with their retinue by Bilarghu (later executed for his crime), Öljaitü began planning fresh campaigns against the Mamluks. The Armenian monk Hayton of Corycus went to visit Clement V in Poitiers, where he wrote his famous La Flor des Estoires d'Orient, a compilation of the events of the Holy Land describing the relations with the Mongols, and setting recommendations for a Christian-Mongol Crusade, with the Franks and the Ilkhanate joining forces against the Muslims.

==== Military Orders ====
The kings of France regularly employed the Knights Templar in the royal treasury to oversee a variety of financial functions of the kingdom. There was little to indicate that Philip IV had less than full trust in their integrity. In 1299, the Templars loaned Philip a substantial sum in order to fight the Franco-Flemish War. The taxes imposed on the French to repay the loan led to an insurrection in Paris, and the Templars defended and gave the king refuge during the incident. But Philip had a history of seizing private property when it suited his needs, such as from the Lombards in 1291 and the Jews in 1306.

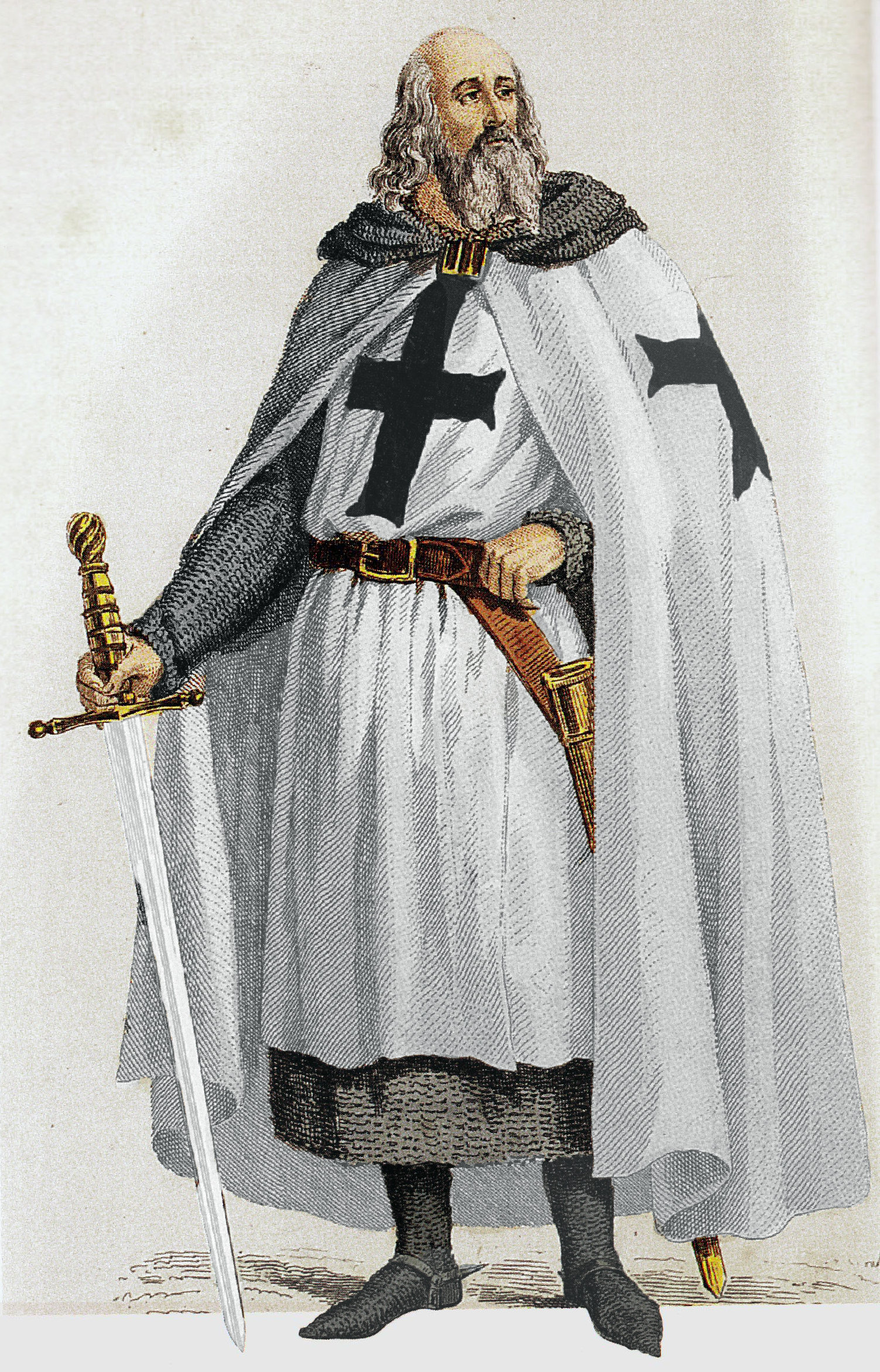
Templar Grand Master Jacques de Molay, put to death in 1314

That same year, Clement invited the Grand Masters to France to discuss their merger. Jacques de Molay arrived first in early 1307, but Foulques de Villaret was delayed for several months. While waiting, they discussed criminal charges that had been made two years earlier by an ousted Templar that were being pursued by Philip IV. It was generally agreed that the charges were false, but nevertheless, Clement sent the king a written request for assistance in the investigation super statu templi (Latin: concerning the state of the Templars). Philip, who was already deeply in debt to the Templars, decided to seize upon the rumors for his own purposes. He began pressuring the church to take action against the order as a way of freeing himself from his debts. A week before his planned formal investigation, Clement received a surprising message that members of the order had been arrested, imprisoned and charged with heresy by an inquisition the pope had not convened.

=== Arrest of the Knights Templar ===
On 14 September 1307, all bailiffs and seneschals in the kingdom of France were sent secret orders from Philip IV directing preparations for the arrest and imprisonment of all members of the Knights Templar. At dawn on 13 October, French soldiers captured all Templars found in France. Clement V, initially incensed at this flagrant disregard for his authority, relented and on 22 November, issued the papal decree Pastoralis praeeminentiae ordering the monarchs of the Christian faith (in England, Iberia, Germany, Italy and Cyprus) to arrest all Templars and confiscate their lands. Jacques de Molay and Hugues de Pairaud, the collector of the royal revenues owed to the Templars, were both arrested, as were many other Templars in France. Philip's ministers Guillaume de Nogaret and Enguerrand de Marigny were tasked to bring the list of charges against the Templars. Other witnesses were said to have been made up of expelled Templar members, previously removed for their misdeeds. Under the orders of the French king, they were arrested and severely tortured. Soon after, the pope sent two cardinals to interview Jacques de Molay and Hugues de Pairaud. At that time, they recanted their confessions and told the other Templars to do the same.

=== Crusades of 1306–1310 ===
From the beginning of his papacy, Clement V had dealt with heresy in Italy, in particular the Apostolics. In addition, he ordered the preaching of a crusade to be launched against the Mamluks in the Holy Land beginning in the spring of 1309. His original intention was to concentrate on a Hospitaller passagium particulare, but ended up supporting three crusades in 1309–1310: against the Egyptians in Syria, the Moors in Granada, and the Venetian soldiers in the papal city of Ferrara. It was the crusade against Venice which proved most successful, it used significant papal funds in a period of soaring military costs and growing suspicion about the real motives of crusading kings and princes. Clement came to believe that the papacy could best promote the cause of Christ by concentrating not on the Holy Land and Iberia, but the Christian West, the policy that was pursued by his successor.

==== Crusade against the Dulcinians ====
In 1306, Clement V ordered a crusade against Fra Dolcino in Piedmont because of heresy. Fra Dolcino became the leader of the movement of Apostolics, and influenced by the millenarist theories of Gioacchino da Fiore. This gave birth to the Dulcinian movement, which existed between the years 1300 and 1307. The movement found its end in the mountains in Sesia Valley and near Biella area on 23 March 1307 when many crusaders (multi crucesignati) finally conquered the fortification built on the mount Rubello by the Dulcinians.

==== Crusade of the Poor ====
The desire for a crusade to the Holy Land resulted first in the unwanted Crusade of the Poor. Having called for a crusade to begin in 1309, Clement V clarified with his bishops that they were to solicit only funds and prayers and to discourage actual participation, with indulgences offered to those providing money. By the spring, the preachers had whipped up intense crusading fervour. The would-be crusaders called themselves the Brothers of the Cross and claimed they had taken the cross, despite the fact that their participation had been rejected by their bishops. Too poor to pay their way, they relied on charity and engaged in plunder to fund their march, targeting Jews in particular. When the crusaders besieged the castle of Genappe where a group of Jews had taken refuge, John II of Brabant sent an army to chase them off. Despite the lack of leadership and planning, over 30,000 crusaders arrived at Avignon in July 1309. Clement granted the poor crusaders an indulgence, but refused to let them participate in the subsequent Hospitaller expedition.

==== Emirate of Granada ====
The Emirate of Granada had been ruled by the Nasrid dynasty since 1230. In 1306, Granada conquered Ceuta, but lost control of the city in 1309 to the Kingdom of Fez which was assisted by the Crown of Aragon. Clement V was frustrated by the insistent Aragonese and Castilian demands for crusade privileges and taxes for the Granada campaign. This issue would be further considered at the Council of Vienne.

==== Crusades against the Arogonese ====
The first of these crusades against the Aragonese was a dispute over the succession of Azzo VIII d'Este. In Ferrara, which was taken into the Papal States to the exclusion of the Este family, papal armies clashed with the Republic of Venice and its populace. When excommunication and interdiction failed to have their intended effect, Clement V preached a crusade in May 1309, declaring that Venetians captured abroad might be sold into slavery, like non-Christians.

A later crusade against the Aragonese known as the Anti-Ghibelline crusades took place 1321–1322. These were crusades preached against Matteo I Visconti and his son Galeazzo I Visconti in 1321 and renewed in 1325 against Aldobrandino II d'Este and his son Obizzo III d'Este and supporters in Ferrara. Angevin forces carried out the fighting for these crusades.

=== Council of Vienne ===
Clement V issued the bull Faciens misericordiam on 12 August 1308 creating papal commissions to investigate the actions of the Templars. It also called for an ecumenical council to convene in 1310 to discuss urgent problems facing Christianity, including the organization of a new crusade. Faciens ordered the collection of depositions from Templars across Christendom, which would be gathered and brought for the pope to determine their fate at a council in 1310. The opening of the Council of Vienne was delayed until 16 October 1311, giving time to the Templars to answer the charges made. A second bull Regnans in coelis invited a large segment of cleric and secular leaders. Philip IV was the sole king to attend, coming later in the session in order to press his case against the Templars.

==== Knights Templar ====
The agenda of the council did not only concern the Templars, but also their holdings, implying that further seizures of property were proposed. Special notices were sent to the Templars directing them to send suitable defensores (defenders) to the council. Jacques de Molay and others were also commanded to appear in person. Molay, however, was already imprisoned in Paris and trials of other Templars were already in progress. The initial opinion was that the Templars should be granted the right to defend themselves and that there was insufficient evidence of heresy, a charge levied by Philip IV. The discussion of the order was then put on hold.

In February 1312, envoys from Philip IV negotiated with the pope without consulting the council, and Philip held an assembly in Lyon to put further pressure on the topic of the Templars. He went to Vienne on 20 March 1312 where Clement was forced to adopt the expedient of suppressing of the Templars on the grounds of the general welfare of the Church. On 22 March, the pope issued the bull Vox in excelso to suppress the Templars. The council placated Philip and condemned the Templars, delivering their wealth in France to the king. Delegates of James II of Aragon insisted the Templar property in Aragon be given to the Order of Calatrava. A series of papal bulls beginning with Ad providam on 2 May 1312 essentially handed over Templar property to the Hospitallers and decided the fate of the Templars themselves.

==== Philip IV and a new crusade ====
A crusade was also discussed as part of the council. The Aragonese delegates wanted to attack the Muslim city of Granada, and the papal vice-chancellor proposed that the Catalans, now located in Thebes and Athens, should march through the Armenian Cilicia to attack the Muslims in the Holy Land. The envoys of Henry II of Cyprus suggested a naval blockade to coincide with an invasion of Egypt. On 3 April 1312, Philip IV vowed to the council to go on crusade within the next six years. Clement V insisted the crusade begin within one year and assigned Philip as its leader. Philip died on 29 November 1314 and with him, the idea of his crusade. He was succeeded by his eldest son Louis X of France.

== Fall of the Templars ==
The trials of the Knights Templar and that of Joan of Arc were the best known of the medieval inquisitions, charged with suppressing heresy by the Catholic Church. The arrest of the Templars on Friday the 13th of October 1307 (incorrectly rumored to the basis of the day's unlucky superstition) led to the investigation, trial, torture and punishment (some by burning at the stake) of the members of storied order. This is recorded in the Chronique du Templier de Tyr. The Templars did survive in Portugal and Aragon.

=== Charges of heresy ===
The alleged crimes of the Templars trace back to 1229 when Louis IX of France proclaimed the duty to eliminate heresy in the kingdom. At the same time, the Albigensian Crusade raged and Inquisitors were given special powers by Honorius III which allowed them to examine even the exempted and protected orders of the Templars, Hospitallers and Cistercians in cases where heresy was suspected. At the end of the Albigensian Crusade, these special powers were never revoked but simply forgotten. For the Templars, Philip IV's royal lawyers concentrated their charges on this one vulnerable exception, that of heresy, to an otherwise untouchable order that answered only to the pope. The charges of heresy against the Templars included sacrilege against the Church and sacred objects, indecent carnal relations, and idolatry.

=== The inquisitional trials ===
The first of the Templar trials began on 19 October 1307 in Paris. A total of 138 prisoners gave a full testimony and almost all admitted guilt to one or more charges. Since torture was used to elicit these confessions, the reliability of their testimony before any of the inquisitional tribunals is suspect. A second important trial that was held at Poitiers on 28 June 1308 where at least 54 Templars testified before the pope and his commission of cardinals, with most defendants confessing to one or more of the charges. William of Paris, as inquisitor of France since 1303, led the campaign against the Templars. He was briefly replaced by the pope at the insistence of Edward II of England but was soon reinstated.

On 23 April 1310, the Templar lawyers went before the commission demanding full disclosure of their accusers and the evidence gathered. They also requested a ban on witnesses conversing with one another, and that all proceedings should be kept secret until they were sent to the pope. That May, the Archbishop of Sens took over the trial of the Templars from the original commission, with the pope directing that actual trials take place. Philip sought to thwart this effort, and had several Templars burned at the stake as heretics to prevent their participation in the trials. Two days after this change, 54 Templars were burned outside of Paris. When the papal commission met on 3 November 1310, they found the Templars had no defenders and adjourned until December 27. At this time the prisoners insisted on legal representation, but the priests that formed the defense team had been imprisoned.

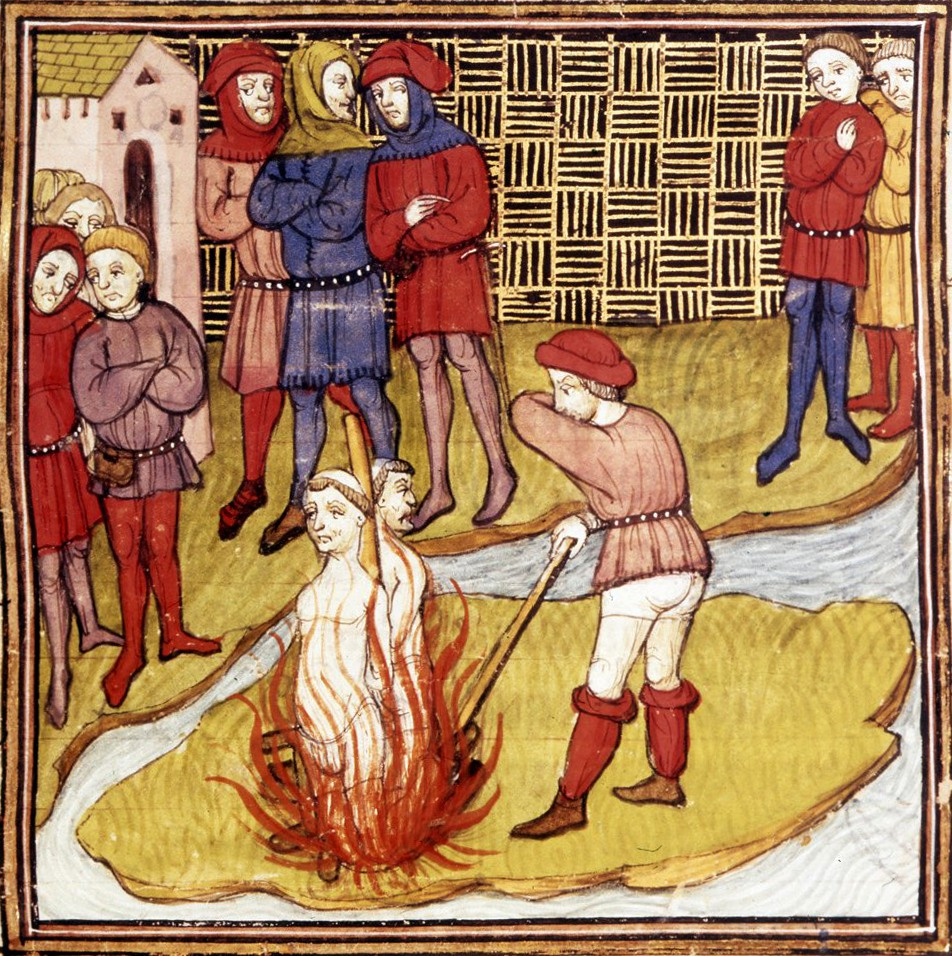
The Burning of the Templars at Paris. Original owned by the British Library

=== Death of the Templar leaders ===
On 11 March 1314, the Templars, including Jacques de Molay, Geoffroi de Charney and Hugues de Peraud, who had been imprisoned nearly seven years were brought to Notre-Dame to receive their sentence, which was to be life imprisonment. The affair was supposed to be concluded when, to the dismay of the prelates and wonderment of the assembled crowd, de Molay and de Charney arose. They had been guilty, they said, not of the crime of heresy, but of betraying their order to save their own lives––the charges were fictitious and the confessions false. When the news reached Philip IV, he pronounced that they were both relapsed heretics to be burned without a further hearing. That same day a pile was erected on the Ile des Juifs, near the palace garden. There de Molay and de Charney were slowly burned to death, refusing all offers of pardon for retraction, and bearing their torment with a composure which won for them the reputation of martyrs among the people, who reverently collected their ashes as relics.

=== Templars in Iberia ===
The Military Order of Christ grew out of the former order of the Knights Templar as it was reconstituted in Portugal. It was founded in 1319 under the protection of Denis of Portugal after the Templars were abolished by Clement V. Denis refused to pursue and persecute the former knights as had occurred in most of the other sovereign states under the political influence of the church. After the Templars were annihilated throughout Europe, Denis revived the Templars of Tomar as the Order of Christ, largely for their aid during the Reconquista and in the reconstruction of Portugal after the wars. They were based at the Convent of Christ, a 12th century Templar stronghold. Denis negotiated with the pope for recognition of the new order and its right to inherit the Templar assets and property. This was granted by the papal bull Ad ea ex quibus on 14 March 1319.

The Templars had been received with enthusiasm within Aragon from their foundation in 1128. Alfonso I of Aragon, having no direct heir, bequeathed his dominions to be divided among the Templars, Hospitallers, and the Order of the Holy Sepulchre, but this bequest was annulled by his subjects in 1131. The Templars had to be contented with certain fortifications, including the Castle of Monzón. While the Aragonese branch of the order was pronounced innocent at the Templars' trial, the bull Vox in excelso was applied to them in spite of the protests of James II of Aragon in 1312. James II was finally allowed to regroup the Templar properties in Aragon and Valencia, and to create a new military order not essentially differing from that of the Templars, which should be charged with the defense of the frontier against the Moors and the pirates. This new Order of Montesa was approved on 10 June 1317 and given Cistercian rule.

== Hospitallers at Rhodes ==
The Hospitaller conquest of Rhodes from the Byzantines took place in 1306–1310. The Hospitaller force, led by Grand Master Foulques de Villaret, landed on the island in the summer of 1306 and quickly conquered most of it except for the city of Rhodes, which remained in Byzantine hands. The Hospitallers transferred their base to the island, which became the center of their activities until it was lost to the Ottomans at the Siege of Rhodes in 1522.

=== Background ===
Shortly after becoming grand master In 1306, Foulques de Villaret began planning an attack on Rhodes. He was anxious to find a location where the Hospitallers would be unfettered by obligations to another power as it was in Cyprus. Independently, Clement V issued instructions for the preaching of a crusade to be launched against the Mamluks in the spring of 1309. This was to be a small, preliminary expedition led by the Hospitallers. After the inopportune Crusade of the Poor, Clement admitted in November 1309 what had long been suspected, that the Hospitaller expedition would not go to the Holy Land and that it was, in fact, a preparatory campaign to help defend Cyprus and enforce the prohibition on Catholics trading with Muslims.

=== Conquest of Rhodes ===
On 23 June 1306, Villaret and the Hospitaller force sailed from Limassol, first landing at Kastellorizo and Kos, hoping to use the islands as a base for reconnaissance. They then sailed to Rhodes. The first assault on the city of Rhodes by land and sea failed, but on 20 September, Feraklos Castle on the island's eastern coast was captured. Five days later they launched another unsuccessful attack on the city, but on 11 November, they took the citadel at Ialysos through the treason of a local Greek, massacring the entire Byzantine garrison.

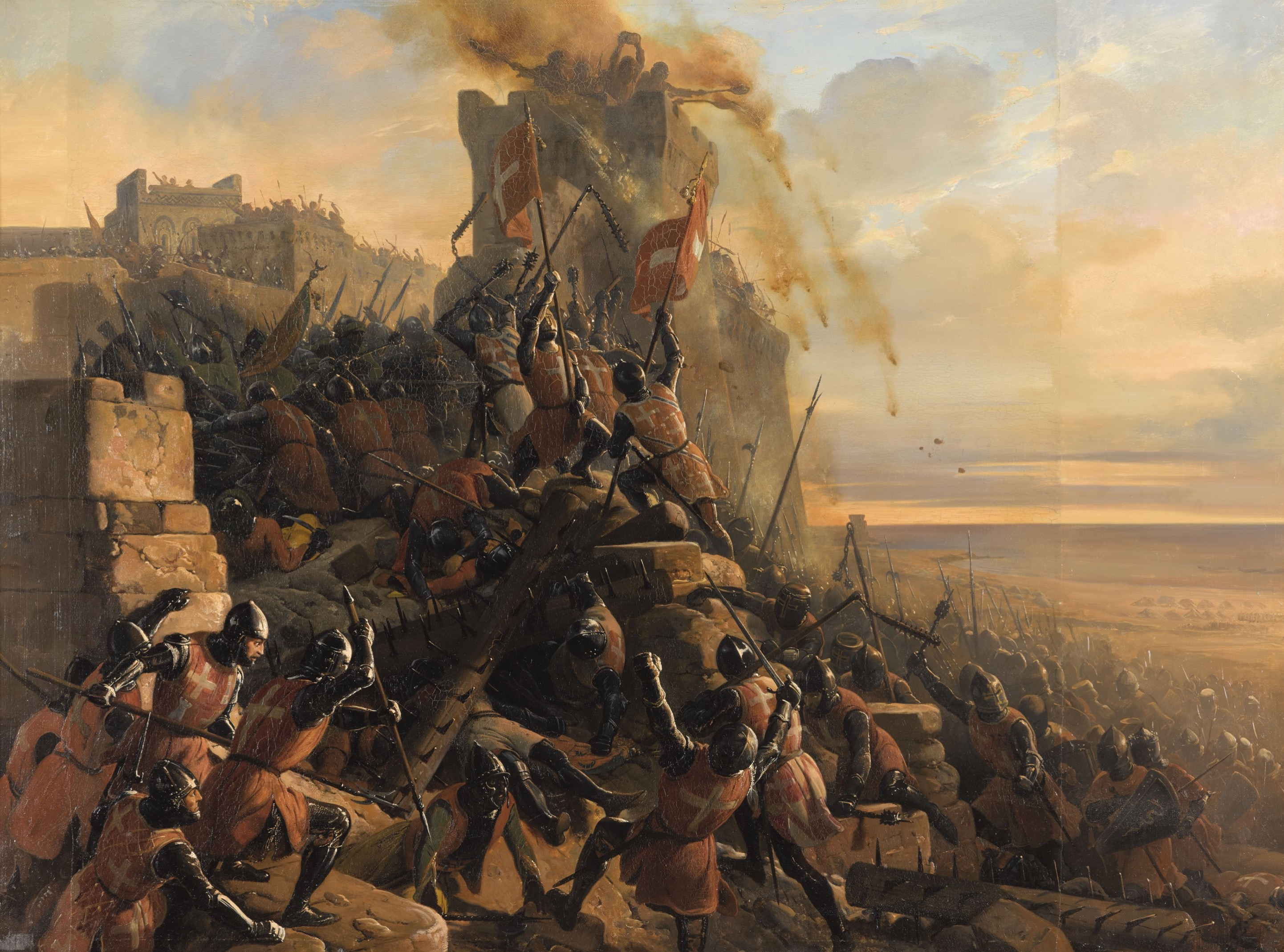
The Hospitaller capture of Rhodes depicted in the Prise de Rhodes, 15 août 1310 by Éloi Firmin Féron.

This success encouraged the Hospitallers to resume the siege of the capital. The locals defended it with success, and asked for reinforcements from Constantinople. The responding Byzantines forced the lifting of the siege. In the spring of 1307, the Hospitallers sent envoys to the emperor, demanding that he hand over the city of Rhodes to them so that they would make it their base in their war against the beyliks. They promised to recognise the suzerainty of the emperor and support mutual military efforts. Andronikos II rejected their proposal, and began preparing further reinforcements. On 5 September 1307, the pope issued an act proclaiming the Hospitallers' ownership of the island. While Lindos was in Hospitaller hands, the city of Rhodes was guarded by Constantinople and the Hospitallers still did not control the entire island for nearly three more years.

The city of Rhodes was finally captured on 15 August 1310, not by force, but through a stroke of luck. A Genoese ship sent by the emperor with supplies for the besieged garrison was blown off course to Famagusta. The ship's captain was captured by a Cypriot knight who brought him to Rhodes before de Villaret. To escape execution, the captain convinced the garrison to surrender on the condition that their lives and property would be spared.

=== Hospitaller Rhodes ===
Following the completion of the conquest, the Hospitallers moved their convent and hospital from Cyprus to Rhodes in 1310, forming what became known as Hospitaller Rhodes. Efforts were made to attract Latin settlers, both to replenish the local population and to provide men for military service. They immediately began military operations in the area by enforcing the papal ban on trade with the Mamluks. This included capturing Genoese vessels that were defying the ban, despite the fact that the Genoese had aided the conquest. The Genoese then allied with the Beylik of Menteshe led by Mesut of Menteshe in an attempt to recapture Rhodes. This was stopped with naval victory at the Battle of Amorgos in 1312. Tensions rose with Venice at the same time, as the Hospitallers seized Karpathos and other Venetian-controlled islands, as well as the Byzantine-controlled port of Halicarnassus and the island of Kastellorizo. Eventually, the Hospitallers reached an agreement with both Italian maritime powers, and the seized islands were returned to Venice in 1316.

In 1317, some Hospitallers attempted a coup against de Villaret. They then elected Maurice de Pagnac as Grand Master in his place, notifying John XXII in July of their actions. The pope summoned both to his court at Avignon to settle the dispute and reappointed de Villaret so that he could tender his resignation formally. Hélion de Villeneuve was named as Master on 18 June 1319, the elderly de Pagnac having died in the meantime.

=== Battle of Chios ===
In October 1312, Albert of Schwarzburg was appointed Grand Preceptor of the Hospitallers and their representative to the Holy See and the courts of Western Europe. He returned to Cyprus in 1315 and was active in campaigns against the Turkish raiders near the new base at Rhodes. He worked with Martino Zaccaria, the lord of Chios, in countering the beyliks, scoring a major naval victory at the Battle of Chios on 23 July 1319. He also seized and fortified Leros whose Greek inhabitants had risen in revolt and rejoined the Byzantines. In 1320 he turned back an attempted Turkish invasion of Rhodes with great loss. The pope also granted Albert half of the preceptory of Cyprus, with the other half going to former grand master Maurice de Pagnac. He was also given the island of Kos, provided he could capture it. In 1320, he defeated a Turkish fleet of eighty vessels, preventing an invasion of Rhodes. With this success, Hospitaller control of the island was secured for the next century.

== The Latin East ==
After the fall of Constantinople in 1204, a number of states were established by the treaty known as Partitio terrarum imperii Romaniae that partitioned the territory of the dissolved Byzantine Empire. Many of the states founded as part of the resultant Latin Empire were still active at the beginning of the 14th century and relevant to the later crusades. From the middle of the 13th century, William II of Villehardouin and the De la Roche family represented the most powerful rulers of Frankish Greece and their influence would be felt for decades. Sources include the Chronicle of the Morea and the Assizes of Romania.

=== Achaea ===
One such Frankish state was the Principality of Achaea which controlled most of the Morea peninsula in southern Greece. Ruled by the princes of Achaea, it maintained some level of independence until 1266 when it was conquered by Charles I of Anjou. His son Charles II of Anjou ruled the principality until 1289 when he conferred it to Isabella of Villehardouin, daughter of William II. Isabella and her husbands ruled Achaea until 5 May 1306 when Charles II bestowed it directly upon his son Philip I of Taranto. In 1313, Philip in turn transferred it to Matilda of Hainaut, who was married to Louis of Burgundy, titular King of Thessalonica. Isabella's sister Margaret of Villehardouin claimed her rights to the principality in 1313 and, lacking success, then transferred them to her daughter Isabelle of Sabran, wife of Ferdinand of Majorca. Both Louis and Ferdinand vied for the principality in the names of their wives, and Louis defeated and killed Ferdinand at the Battle of Manolada on 5 July 1316. On 2 August 1316, Louis of Burgundy died under mysterious circumstances and Robert of Naples gave the principality to his brother John of Gravina, to whom Matilda was briefly married, under duress, before being imprisoned in the Castel dell'Ovo.

Frederick Trogisio, councillor to Robert of Naples, was installed as bailli from July 1318 until 1321. His tenure was troubled as Naples' control over the principality was contested and the threat remained with the Catalan Company that had recently conquered neighbouring Athens. Frederick and his army were defeated at the Battle of Saint George in September 1320, leaving part of the principality in Byzantine hands. In 1325, John launched a military expedition where he re-established his authority in Cefaphonia and Zante, but was unable to recapture Skorta.

In 1332, Philip I of Taranto died and was succeeded by his son Robert of Taranto, who became the new suzerain of Achaea. Not wishing to swear fealty to his nephew, John arranged to surrender Achaea to him in exchange for Robert's rights to the Kingdom of Albania.

=== Mystras and the Morea ===
In 1248, William II of Villehardouin, prince of Achaea, captured Monemvasia, the last remaining Byzantine outpost on the Morea. After taking Mount Taygetos, he built the fortress that came to be known as Mystras. In September 1259, William's forces were defeated at the Battle of Pelagonia, two years prior to the re-establishment of the Byzantine Empire. In 1262, Mystras was established as the seat of government of Byzantine territories in the Morea. Soon, warfare broke out between the Byzantines and Franks. The first Byzantine attempts to subdue the Principality of Achaea were beaten back in 1263–1264 at the Battle of Prinitza and Battle of Makryplagi, but the Byzantines were firmly ensconced in Laconia. Mystras became a royal capital in 1349, when the Despotate of the Morea was established.

Andronicus Asen became the epitropos (overseer) of the Byzantine province Morea in 1316. Asen was the son of Tsar Ivan Asen III and Irene Palaiologina, and so was the nephew of emperor Andronikos II Palaiologos. On 9 September 1320, Asen's forces defeated Achaea at the Battle of Saint George. This resulted in Arcadia, the heartland of the Morea, coming firmly under Byzantine control.

=== Athens ===
The Duchy of Athens was held by the family of De la Roche until 1308 when it passed to Walter V of Brienne. Walter hired the Catalan Company to fight against the Despotate of Epirus. When he tried to dismiss them and cheat them of their pay, they defeated the Athenians at the Battle of Halmyros on 15 March 1311 and annexed the duchy. Walter V died in that battle. In 1312, the Catalans recognized the suzerainty of Frederick III of Sicily, who appointed his son Manfred of Athens as duke. The ducal title remained in the hands of Aragon until 1388, but actual authority was exercised by a series of vicars-general, beginning with Alfonso Fadrique, illegitimate son of Frederick III, in 1317.

Over the next two years, Fadrique warred with the Republic of Venice and attacked the Triarchy of Negroponte after Boniface of Verona died. In 1318, John II Ducas, the sebastokrator of Neopatras, died and Fadrique invaded Thessaly. He took possession of his castles at Zetouni and Gardiki and conquered Neopatras, Siderokastron, Loidoriki, Domokos, and Pharsalus. He conquered the palace at Neopatras and took the title of Vicar-General of the Duchy of Neopatras. In 1319, a peace treaty was signed between Venice and Fadrique, whereby he retained Karystos.

=== Anti-Catalan Crusade ===
Walter VI of Brienne was the son of Walter V of Brienne and, after his father's death at Halmyros, became count of Brienne, Lecce, and Conversano. But he did not inherit the Duchy of Athens, except for Argos and Nauplia. After 1321, Walter had repeatedly announced his intention to recover the duchy, concluding a truce with the Catalans in 1328. In June 1330, a papal bull for the Anti-Catalan Crusade was issued by John XXII, pope since 1316. Robert of Naples also gave the crusade his support, and allowed his feudatories to join it. The Venetians, however, renewed their treaty with the Catalans in April 1331. Sailing from Brindisi in August, Walter attacked first Cephalonia and Zakynthos, and then the Despotate of Epirus, forcing them to recognize the overlordship of Robert. Walter had neither the troops to overwhelm the Catalans nor the money to sustain a prolonged war of sieges and attrition, and found no support among the native Greek population. By summer 1332, it was clear that the expedition had failed, and Walter returned to Brindisi, saddled with even more crippling debts.

== Teutonic Knights ==
The Teutonic Knights were one of the three Military Orders and were founded in Acre at the time of the Third Crusade. It was formed to aid Christian pilgrimages to the Holy Land, to establish hospitals and to support crusades in the Baltics, known as the Northern Crusades. They provided military support to all the major crusading expeditions from the Fifth Crusade on. As the Franks established their new capital in Acre, the Teutonic Knights sought additional space, buying Monifort Castle in 1220. They expanded the fortifications and built an elongated two-story hall in the center that is now the main remnant of the ruined castle. In 1228, Holy Roman Emperor Frederick II invested the Teutonic Knights with territories in East Prussia. After he assumed the role of king of Jerusalem, Frederick bestowed new privileges upon Grand Master Hermann of Salza, elevating him to the status of Reichsfürst. The Teutonic Knights were subsequently placed on equal footing as the Templars and Hospitallers. Sources for the Teutonic Knights include the Chronicon terrae Prussiae and the Novgorod First Chronicle.

=== Takeover of Gdańsk ===
By 1271, most of the Crusader strongholds had fallen into the hands of the Mamluk sultan Baibars, who then successfully besieged Montfort Castle. Due to prior negotiations between Baibars and the Crusaders, the latter were allowed to leave the castle with all of their belongings and return to Acre. In 1290, the District Commander of Austria Konrad von Feuchtwangen became the new Grand Master of the Teutonic Order. Following the loss of Acre In 1291, he relocated the Orders' headquarters to Venice. Gottfried von Hohenlohe succeed him in 1296, serving as grand master until his abdication in 1303.

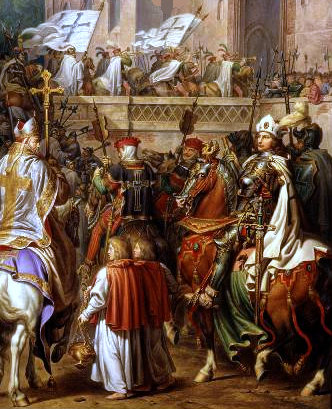
Siegfried von Feuchtwangen entering Malbork Castle, by Carl Wilhelm Kolbe the Younger (1825)

Siegfried von Feuchtwangen became the next grand master in 1303. On 13 November 1308, he oversaw the Teutonic takeover of Gdańsk. This was solidified with the Treaty of Soldin in 1309 and subsequently taking control of Pomerelia. This resulted in their becoming Poland's strongest enemy. Due to the pope dismantling the Knights Templar, von Feuchtwangen moved the headquarters of the Order from Venice to Malbork Castle in Pomesania, outside of the Holy Roman Empire.

=== Polish–Teutonic War ===
Werner von Orseln became grand master in 1324 and oversaw the Polish–Teutonic War which began in 1326 with the Raid on Brandenburg. The annexation and possession of Gdańsk (Danzig) and the surrounding region was consistently disputed by the Polish kings Władysław I Łokietek (the Elbow-High) and Casimir III the Great—claims that led to the six-year war. On 18 November 1330, von Orseln died after an assassination attempt and was succeeded by Lothar of Brunswick and the war continued, culminating on 27 September 1331 with the Polish victory in the Battle of Płowce. Lawsuits in the papal court in 1320 and 1333 were ruled in favor of Poland, but the Teutonic Knights did not comply and continued to occupy the annexed Polish territories. They again invaded Poland, briefly occupying the regions of Kuyavia and Dobrzyń Land. A peace was not formalized until 8 July 1343 with the Treaty of Kalisz.

== Further proposals for Crusades ==
The recovery of the Holy Land remained a goal of the Christian West throughout the 14th century. There were at least three French plans for a crusade from 1317–1333 involving three successive kings of France. Italian historian Thaddeus of Naples, in his description of the fall of Acre, included an exhortation for the West to conquer Jerusalem that was addressed to the pope and all Christian sovereigns. Nevertheless, neither Boniface VIII nor Benedict XI addressed recovery proposals. Clement V did issue such appeals in his encyclicals of 1305 and 1308. The grand masters of the Templars and Hospitallers both produced responses. Around the same time, the Armenian Hayton of Corycus visited Europe and produced the recovery treatise La Flor des Estoires d'Orient at Clement's expressed request.

=== John XXII ===
Clement V died on 20 April 1314, and the papacy was followed by a sede vacante of two years. Frustrated by the inaction, Philip I of Poitiers, later king of France, summoned the ongoing Papal Conclave to Lyon in August 1316. Philip announced that none of the cardinals would be allowed to leave until they had chosen a new pope. This conclave elected John XXII on 7 August 1316, and he was crowned in Lyon. He set up his residence in Avignon rather than Rome, continuing the Avignon Papacy of his predecessor.

Mamluk sultan al-Naser Mohammed continued to ravage Christian Armenian Cilicia and John told the Armenians that he would call for a crusade to relieve tham. On 1 July 1322, he asked Mongol ruler Abu Sa'id Bahadur Khan to intervene in Cilicia, reminding him of the alliance of his ancestors with Christians. Mongol troops were sent to Cilicia, but only arrived after a ceasefire had been negotiated.

=== Philip V of France ===
When Louis X died in 1316, his son John I of France was king for five days. Breaking a long tradition, Philip IV's second son Philip V of France became king, although disputed. John XXII set out his renewed desire to see fresh crusades. Philip IV had agreed to a joint plan for a new French-led crusade at the Council of Vienne, with Philip V taking the cross himself in 1313. Once king, Philip V was obligated to carry out these plans and asked John XXII for and received additional funds after 1316. Both Philip and John agreed that a French crusade was impossible while the situation in Flanders remained unstable. Nonetheless, John continued to assure the Armenians that Philip would shortly lead a crusade to relieve them, but instead turned his energies to what became the Crusade of Ludwig IV of Bavaria. An attempt to send a naval vanguard from the south of France under Louis I of Bourbon failed, with his forces being destroyed in a battle off Genoa in 1319. Over the winter of 1319–1320, Philip convened a number of meetings with French military leaders in preparation for a potential second expedition, that in turn formed William Durand's treatise Informatio brevis on crusading. By the end of Philip's reign, he and John had a falling out over the issue of new monies and commitments to how they were spent, and the attentions of both were focused on managing the challenge of the Shepherds' Crusade.

=== Charles the Fair ===
Philip V died on 3 January 1322. By the principle of male succession that was invoked in 1316, he was succeeded by his younger brother, Charles IV of France. The crusades remained a popular cause in France during Charles's reign. His father Philip IV had committed France to a fresh crusade and his brother Philip V had brought plans for a fresh invasion close to execution in 1320. Their plans were cancelled, however, leading to the informal and chaotic Shepherds' Crusade.

Charles entrusted Charles of Valois to negotiate with the pope over a fresh crusade. Charles, an enthusiastic crusader who took the cross in 1323, had a history of diplomatic intrigue in the Levant, once attempting to become the Byzantine emperor. The negotiations over the crusade floundered over the pope's concerns whether Charles IV would actually use any monies raised for a crusade for actual crusading, or whether they would be frittered away on the more general activities of the French crown. On 28 February 1301, Catherine of Courtenay became in the second wife of Charles of Valois, and thus Charles became titular Latin Emperor with Catherine on 11 October 1307. Charles of Valois's negotiations were also overtaken by the conflict with England in the War of Saint-Sardos.

After the death of Charles of Valois, Charles IV became increasingly interested in a French intervention in Byzantium, taking the cross in 1326. Andronikos II Palaiologos responded by sending an envoy to Paris in 1327, proposing peace and discussions on ecclesiastical union. A French envoy was sent in return with the pope's blessing later in the year. However, the first Byzantine civil war of 1321–1328 precluded any serious negotiations.

Charles IV died on 1 February 1328 and no French intervention in Byzantium would be forthcoming. Charles was to die without a male heir, resulting ultimately in the claim to the French throne by Edward III of England and the subsequent Hundred Years War (1337–1453). Charles' cousin Philip VI of France would be crowned as king on 1 April 1328, the first of the House of Valois.

=== Shepherds' Crusade ===
The Shepherds' Crusade (the Pastoreaux) emerged from Normandy in 1320. The repeated calls for crusades by Philip V and his predecessors combined with the absence of large-scale expeditions ultimately boiled over into this popular and uncontrolled crusade. Philip's intent for a new crusade had certainly become widely known by the spring of 1320, and the emerging peace in Flanders and the north of France had left a large number of displaced peasants and soldiers. The result was essentially a violent mob threatening local Jews, royal castles, the wealthier clergy, and Paris itself. The movement was ultimately condemned by John XXII, who doubted whether the movement had any real intent to carry out a crusade. Philip V was forced to move against it, crushing the movement militarily and driving the remnants south across the Pyrenees into Aragon.

=== Proposals for the recovery of the Holy Land ===
Several independent treatises calling for the recovery of the Holy Land were also written in the 14th century. These include ones written by Majorcan Christian apologist Ramon Lull, French author Pierre Dubois, and Venetian statesman and geographer Marino Sanuto. French archbishop Guillaume Adam also wrote the influential treatise De modo sarracenos extirpandi between 1316 and 1317.

==== Ramon Lull ====
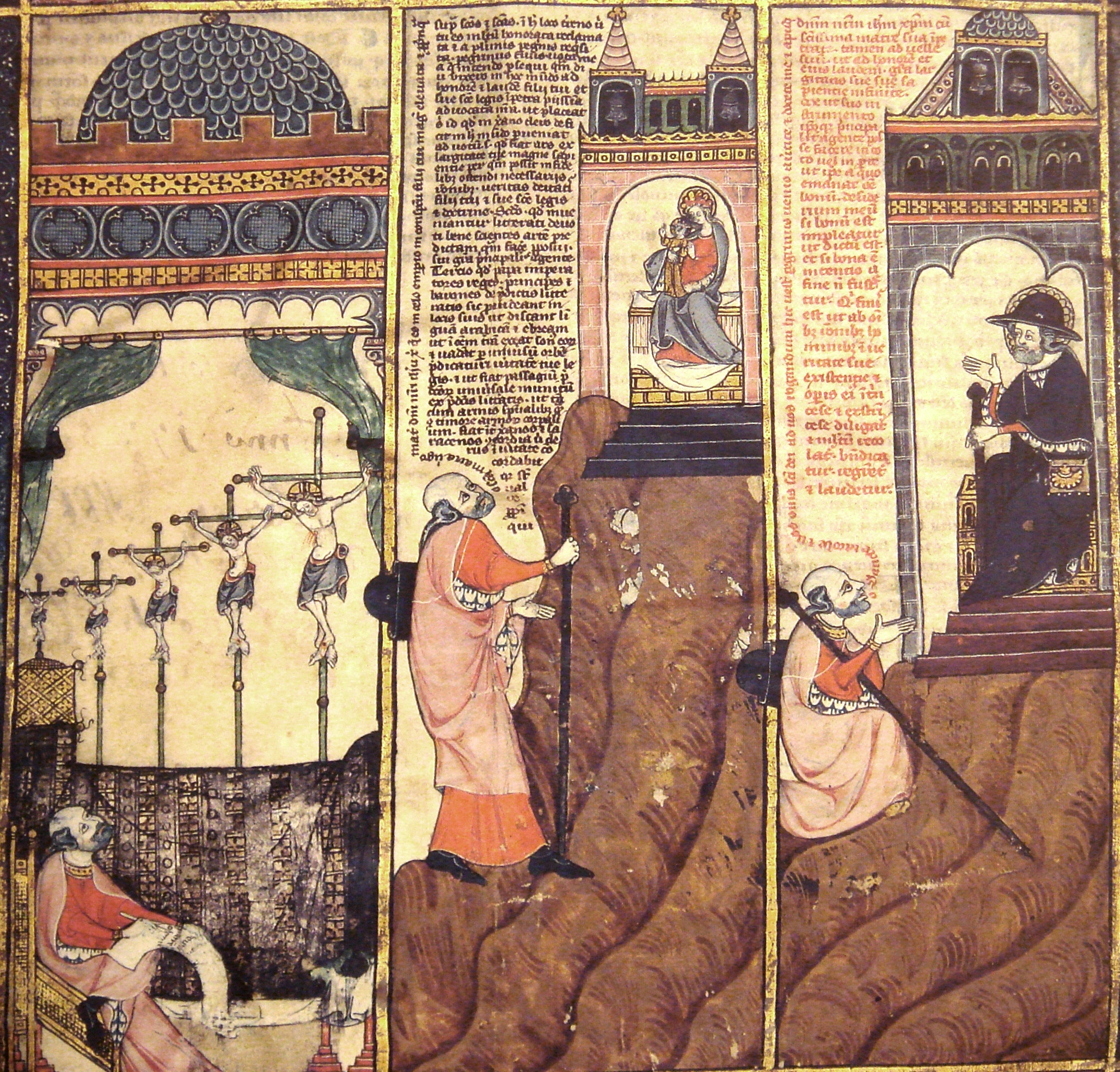
Scenes from the life of Raymond Lull, from a 14th-century manuscript

Ramon Lull was one of the luminaries of the schools of the Middle Ages and stands out as a latter apostle of the crusades. Lull viewed the teaching of the languages of the East as an effective means of annihilating Islam and the domination of its disciples. He made a pilgrimage to Palestine, travelled through Syria, Armenia, Egypt and Tunisia, and returned to Europe to describe the miserable treatment of Christians there. In 1305 and again in 1309, Lull wrote proposals for crusades to James II of Aragon. Both advised opening the Spain-to-Africa route to the Holy Land that required first a crusade against the Kingdom of Granada. With papal support, the Siege of Algeciras was launched by James II and Ferdinand IV of Castile in July 1309.

His view on Eastern languages was vindicated at the Council of Vienne, where the delegates from Aragon pushed for the creation of a places to teach different languages in order to more-widely preach the Gospel. As a result, the council pushed for the establishment of chairs the languages of the East at major Western universities. In 1314, Lull traveled again to Tunis, prompted by the correspondence between James II of Aragon and al-Lihyani, indicating that the caliph wished to convert to Christianity. Whereas Lull had been met with difficulties during his previous visits to North Africa, he was allowed to operate this time without interference from the authorities due to the improved relations between Tunis and Aragon.

==== Pierre Dubois ====
Pierre Dubois was a publicist in the reign of Philip IV of France and the author of a series of political pamphlets embodying original and daring views. In 1306, he wrote De recuperatione Terre Sancte (Treatise on the Recovery of the Holy Land), divided into two parts dedicated to Edward I of England and Philip IV, respectively. It is a rambling treatise that covers many topics only tangentially related to the crusade. Dubois outlined the conditions he viewed as necessary to a successful crusade—the establishment and enforcement of a state of peace among the Christian nations of the West by a council of the church; the reform of the monastic and military orders; the reduction of their revenues; the instruction of a number of young men and women in Oriental languages and the natural sciences with a view to the government of Eastern peoples; and the establishment of Charles of Valois as emperor of the East.

==== Marino Sanudo ====
Marino Sanuto the Elder was a Venetian statesman and geographer who wrote Liber Secretorum Fidelium Crucis (Secrets of True Crusaders to help them to recover the Holy Land). The work was begun in March 1306 and offered to Clement V in January 1307 as a manual for true crusaders who desired the reconquest of the Holy Land. To this original Liber Secretorum, Sanuto added two other books and in September 1321, the entire work was presented to John XXII, together with world and regional maps of the world, and plans of Jerusalem, Antioch and Acre. A copy was also offered to the king of France, to whom Sanuto desired to commit the military and political leadership of the new crusade.

== Crusades of 1336–1350 ==
New crusades for the recovery of the Holy Land were continually promoted by the royals in France and the papacy. Philip VI, king of France since 1328, was a strong proponent of the crusade but his plans were interrupted by the Hundred Years' War.

=== Hugh IV of Cyprus ===
Henry II of Cyprus died on 31 March 1324 and was succeeded by his nephew Hugh IV of Cyprus. Hugh was crowned king of Cyprus on 15 April 1324 at the Cathedral of Saint Sophia in Nicosia and would serve until 1358. He also received the crown of Jerusalem in Famagusta. Like his predecessors, Hugh was interested in reclaiming Jerusalem and his approach was to heal the rift with the Lusignans, the Ibelins, and the Capetian House of Anjou through arranged marriages. Toward that end, Hugh had his stepson Guy of Ibelin marry Maria of Bourbon, daughter of Louis I of Bourbon. Louis was heavily involved in the plans of Charles IV of France for a crusade to recover the Holy Land. Hugh hoped that the marriage would strengthen his chances of gaining control over the Holy Land, especially against the claims of the Capetians who had disputed the Lusignans' claim to the throne of Jerusalem since the 1270s. The outbreak of France's war with England in 1337 put an end to Louis' hopes to lead a crusade. Guy began taking part in state affairs in the late 1330s and was made constable of Cyprus, but died in 1343.

=== The Holy League ===
The Holy League was a military alliance of the chief Christian states of the Aegean Sea and the Eastern Mediterranean against the mounting threat of naval raids by the Turkish beyliks of Anatolia. After diplomatic exchanges between Pope John XXII and king Philip VI of France, a proposed crusade in the Aegean sea to thwart Turkish piracy was organised for May 1334.. The alliance was spearheaded by Venice, the main regional naval power, and included the kingdom of France, the Hospitaller Knights, The kingdom of Cyprus and the Byzantine Empire. Begun in 1334, the Holy League conducted a short-lived crusade against the Aydinid Turkish fleet. The crusade was led by Pietro Zeno, serving as bailiff of Negroponte. That year, a Turkish armada under Umur Bey attacked Negroponte, and Zeno bought them off with a large tribute. As a result, Zeno was accused by Doge Francesco Dandolo with arranging an anti-Turkish alliance. Nevertheless, by the end of the year the Holy League, a union formed for the discomfiture of the Turks and the defense of Christianity, had been formally constituted. In 1334, Zeno took command of the league's fleet and, after a series of raids on the Turkish coast, defeated the fleet of Yakhshï Khān, the Beylik of Karasi, at the Battle of Adramyttion.. This allowed the Christians in the Aegean to enjoy a period without turkish piracy. Zeno later served as one of the leaders of the Smyrnaiote Crusade of 1344.

=== Philip VI of France ===
Philip VI of France, the cousin of Charles IV, was crowned as king on 1 April 1328. Between 1331 and 1336, one of Philip's chief ambitions was the recovery of the Holy Land. Despite the issues of succession of the French throne, Philip initially enjoyed relatively amicable relations with Edward III of England, and they planned a crusade together in 1332 which was never executed. However, the status of the Duchy of Aquitaine remained a sore point, and tension increased. Philip provided refuge for David II of Scotland in 1334 and declared himself champion of his interests, which enraged Edward. By 1336, they were enemies, although not yet openly at war.

=== Directorium ad passagium faciendum ===
The projected crusade, from a copy of Jean Miélot's translation

The Directorium ad passagium faciendum is an anonymous 24,000-word Latin treatise on crusading submitted to Philip VI sometime before 1332. The document proposed the conquest of the Holy Land, the Byzantine empire and Russia, and their subjection to the Catholic Church. It also outlines how this might be achieved and describes how the conquered territories could be administered. The French translation based on those by Jean de Vignay in 1333 and Jean Miélot in 1455 appears in RHC Documents arméniens.

=== Crusade of 1336 ===
In 1329, John XXII called Peter Paludanus to Avignon, and consecrated him Latin Patriarch of Jerusalem. The same year, Paludanus journeyed into Egypt to negotiate with sultan al-Nasir Muhammad for the deliverance of Palestine to the West. The sultan was immovable. The accounts which the patriarch gave of the miserable condition of the native Christians and pilgrims harangued his Western audience to the necessity for attacking the Muslims and stopping the progress of their domination in the East. This led to the announcement of another crusade, but owing to apathy and dissensions among the Christian princes, the project failed.

Peter III Roger de Beaufort, then Archbishop of Rouen and later pope, was one of the Peers of France and he was a member of the embassy sent in 1333 by Philip VI to his son John II of France, then Duke of Normandy. The purpose of the embassy was to swear in their name to take the cross and serve in a crusade in the Holy Land. On 1 October 1333, the archbishop preached a crusading sermon before an assembly of noblemen in the presence of Philip in Paris at the Prés des Clercs. After the sermon, Philip again took the cross and vowed to go on a holy voyage overseas to restore the Kingdom of Jerusalem. Philip III of Navarre, John III of Brabant, Odo IV of Burgundy, John of Bohemia and Louis I of Bourbon all took the cross.

Philip gave orders that a fleet be assembled in the port of Marseilles to receive forty thousand crusaders. Edward III, to whom the crusade offered an easy means of imposing taxes, promised to accompany him with an army in the pilgrimage beyond the seas. Most of the republics of Italy, with the kings of Arragon, Majorca, and Hungary, were engaged to supply money, troops, and vessels for the expedition. In the midst of their preparations, John XXII died on 4 December 1334. This triggered the 1334 Papal Conclave, resulting in the election of Benedict XII on 20 December 1334.

In September 1335, the archbishop held a provincial council at the Priory of Nôtre-Dame-du Pré in Rouen. Two of his bishops were present, the other four were represented by procurators. The cathedral chapters of the province and the abbots of monasteries were invited as well. The council issued a dozen canons, urging the lower clergy to be diligent in their assigned duties. The most notable item was the encouragement given to bishops to facilitate the business of those who wished to join the king on crusade. The crusade was preached throughout the kingdom and it was planned that Philip VI would set out for the East in August 1336.

When the news of a new crusade reached the East, the local Christians, pilgrims and European merchants were exposed to renewed persecutions. The sultan of Cairo and several of his emirs began assembling armies for the purpose of resisting the crusaders, or to attack the Christians in the West. The caliph al-Mustakfi I directed all Muslims to take up arms. The aim of this Islamic crusade (jihad), preached in the name of Muhammad, was to penetrate into Europe by the way of Gibraltar. The caliph's Holy warriors swore to annihilate Christianity and to convert all the Christian temples into stables. At the same time in Europe, the zeal of the princes and crusaders who had taken the cross to combat the enemies of Christ had dimmed. When Benedict XII succeeded John XXII, he found that hatred, mistrust and jealousies had taken the place of enthusiasm. Christians from the East continued to describe their persecutions and the preparations of Islam against the nations of the West.

Benedict XII continued his exhortations, but the possibility of a new crusade was met with indifference, and the populace lost interest in contending with the Muslims. It was then that a Brother Andrew of Antioch came to Avignon to plead for the aid of the pope and the nobles of the West. Philip VI had come to Avignon to inform the pope that the voyage into the East should be deferred. Andrew confronted the king, pressing his case for the deliverance of the Holy Land back to the Church. The king was surprised at this strange appeal and asked Andrew to accompany him to Paris. Andrew declined, saying he would return to Jerusalem, alone if necessary. Philip hastened home to deal with England.

Philip VI had assembled a large naval fleet off Marseilles as part of this ambitious plan for a crusade to the Holy Land. However, the plan was abandoned and the fleet, including elements of the Scottish navy, moved to the English Channel off Normandy in 1336, threatening England. Edward III had laid claim to the throne of the Capets, and his ambition was the signal for the Hundred Years' War. Philip, attacked by a formidable enemy, was obliged to renounce his expedition to the Holy Land, and employ the troops and fleets that he had collected for the defense of his own kingdom. The crusade was delayed indefinitely with papal approval on 13 March 1336.

=== Clement VI and the Smyrniote Crusades ===
Benedict XII died on 25 April 1342 and the 1342 Papal Conclave was convened shortly thereafter. On 7 May 1342, the Archbishop of Rouen was elected pope, taking the name Clement VI. The new pope went further than his predecessors on new crusades, but the resultant expeditions never made it past Anatolia. As one of his first papal actions, Clement proclaimed a crusade in 1343 which was the first of what became known as the Smyrniote Crusades. The Great Council of Venice elected Pietro Zeno as captain of the flotilla sent to assist the crusade against Aydinid-held Smyrna. Other crusader leaders included patriarch Henry of Asti.

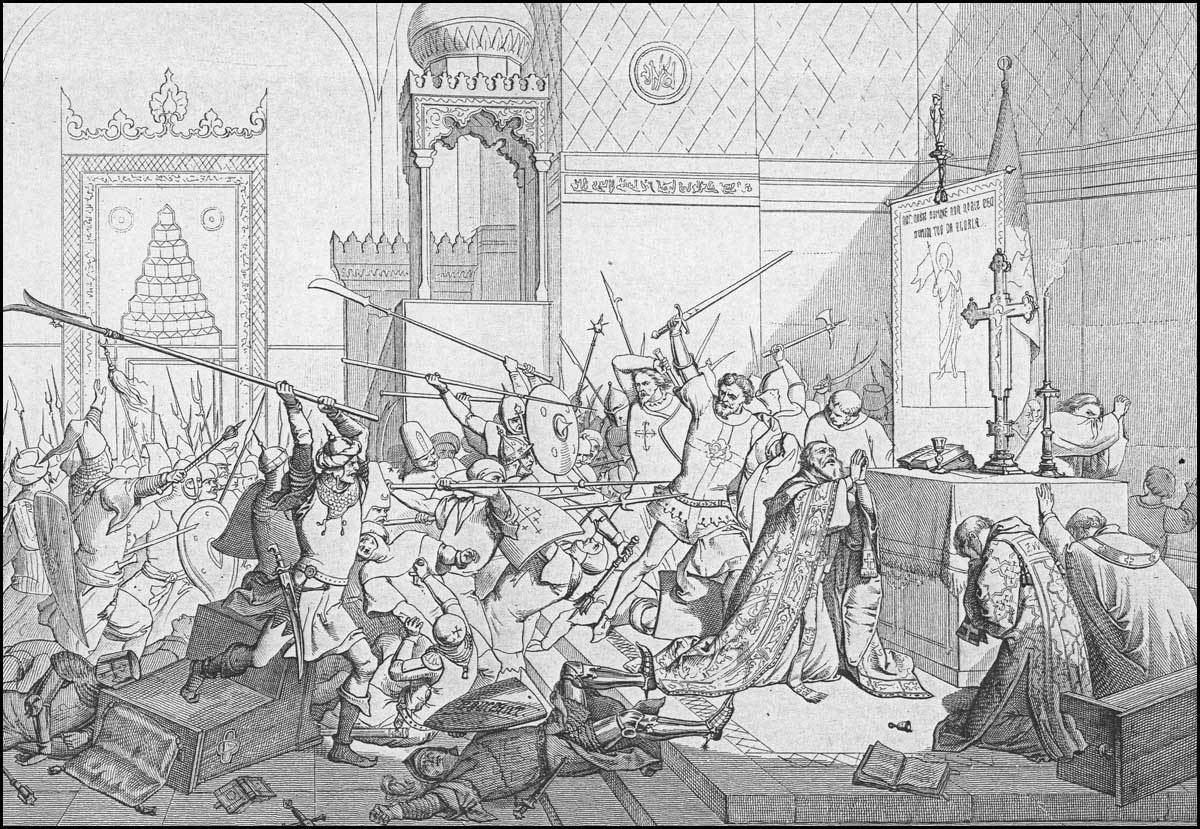
Depiction of the death of Pietro Zeno, by Giuseppe Gatteri

The poet Petrarch, who was then at Avignon, proved one of the most ardent apostles of a new crusade. The poet sent letter to the Doge of Venice Francesco Dandolo to induce him to enter into a war against the Muslims. The states of Italy united their forces to make an expedition to the East. The crusade began with a naval victory of the Battle of Pallene on 13 May 1344 against Turkish raiders, and ended with an assault on Smyrna. On 29 October 1344, the combined forces of the Hospitaliers of Rhodes, the Republic of Venice, the Papal States and the Kingdom of Cyprus attacked the Beylik of Aydın. The governor Umur Bey was a close ally of John VI Kantakouzenos, later Byzantine emperor, and so they had support from that quarter. Zeno was killed by Umur Bey's forces in an ambush while he and other crusaders were attempting to celebrate mass in the no-man's land between the battle lines. The Western forces captured both the harbor and city from the Turks, which they held for nearly 60 years. The citadel fell in 1348 with the death of Umur Bey.

In May 1345, Humbert II, Dauphin of the Viennois, left Marseille leading a papal fleet called by Clement VI. This led to the second of the Smyrniote Crusades against the Aydınids, also known as the Crusade of Humbert II of Viennois. It was intended to assist the recaptured Frankish port of Smyrna by responding to a January 1345 attack during a time of truce by the Turkish garrison upon Christians worshiping in the demolished cathedral. While at sea, his fleet was attacked by the Genoa near Rhodes. He was also asked to intervene by Venice in the conflict between Bartolomeo Zaccaria and Guglielma Pallavicini over the Marquisate of Bodonitsa. Humbert's battle for control of Smyrna in 1346 led to 55 years of Christian rule over the city. Later, the fleet devastated a Turkish pirate fleet at the Battle of Imbros in 1347. The expedition is described in the Book of Chivalry by Geoffroi de Charny.

=== Crusade against Novgorod ===
In 1348, Magnus IV of Sweden led a crusade against Novgorod, marching up the Neva, forcibly converting the tribes along that river, and briefly capturing the fortress of Orekhov for a second time. The Novgorodians retook the fortress in 1349 after a seven-month siege, and Magnus fell back, in large part due to the ravages of the plague further West. While he spent much of 1351 trying to drum up support for further crusading action among the German cities in the Baltic States, he never returned to attack Novgorod.

== Later Crusades, 1350–1400 ==
Hugh IV of Cyprus abdicated on 24 November 1358 and was succeeded by his son Peter I of Cyprus (Peter I de Lusignan). As king of Cyprus, he was the titular king of Jerusalem and was crowned at Saint Nicholas Cathedral in Famagusta on 5 April 1360. He had founded the chivalric Order of the Sword in 1347, dedicated to the recovery of Jerusalem, and attempted to convince nobles in Europe to mount a new crusade. John II of France became the new king on 26 September 1350 upon the death of his father Philip VI and would plan a new crusade with Peter I. There were also a number of minor crusades related to internal problems within the Catholic Church.

=== The Crusades of Urban V ===
Clement VI died on 6 December 1352, having spent his later years dealing with the Black Death. Suspicion fell on the Jews for the plague, and pogroms erupted around Europe. Clement issued the papal bull Quamvis Perfidiam in 1348 which condemned the violence and said those who blamed the plague on the Jews were guilty of a falsehood. After the 1352 Papal Conclave, the Avignon papacy continued under Innocent VI. He served for an uneventful ten years before dying on 12 September 1362. The Papal Conclave of 1362 began on 22 September and Urban V was elected pope on 28 September. He would successfully launch the Savoyard Crusade (described below) in 1366 in addition to an Italian crusade to recover papal lands and plan for an attack on the Turks in Anatolia.

Bologna had been conquered by archbishop Giovanni Visconti, the new lord of Milan. In 1362, Urban ordered a crusade to be preached throughout Italy against his nephew Bernabò Visconti for theft of the church's estate. In March 1363, Bernabò was declared a heretic, but Urban found it necessary to pursue peace the following year. Through the mediation of Holy Roman Emperor Charles IV, Urban lifted his excommunication against Bernabò and Bologna was returned to the papacy in 1363 through a lengthy negotiation by cardinal Gil Álvarez Carrillo de Albornoz.

Urban V's greatest desire was to lead of a crusade against the Muslims in Anatolia. In 1363, John II of France and Peter I of Cyprus came to Avignon and it was decided that there should be a war against the Turks. It was Urban and Peter who were most eager for the crusade, as the French were exhausted by recent losses in the Hundred Years' War, and some of their leaders were still being held prisoner in England. Urban held a special ceremony on Holy Saturday 1363, and bestowed the crusader's cross on the two kings and on cardinal Hélie de Talleyrand as well. John II was appointed Rector and Captain General of the crusade. Talleyrand was appointed apostolic legate, but he died on 17 January 1364, before the expedition could set out. Assembling the army proved an impossible task, and John returned to prison in England. He died in London on 8 April 1364.

=== Alexandrian Crusade ===
Peter I of Cyprus, disappointed by John II's return to captivity in England and the death of Talleyrand, collected whatever soldiers he could and launched an attack on Alexandria, Egypt. The Alexandrian Crusade of 1362–1365 resulted in the destruction of the city, but had little real impact. Its impetus was financial rather than religious, as Urban V had no influence on the expedition. Beginning in 1362, Peter amassed an army and sought financial support for his crusade to the Holy Land. When he learned of a planned Mamluk attack on Cyprus, he redirected his military ambitions against Egypt. He arranged for his fleet and army to assemble at Rhodes, where they were joined by a Hospitaller contingent. In October 1365, Peter set sail, commanding a sizable expeditionary force. Making landfall in Alexandria on 9 October 1365, over the next three days the army pillaged the city and killed and enslaved thousands.

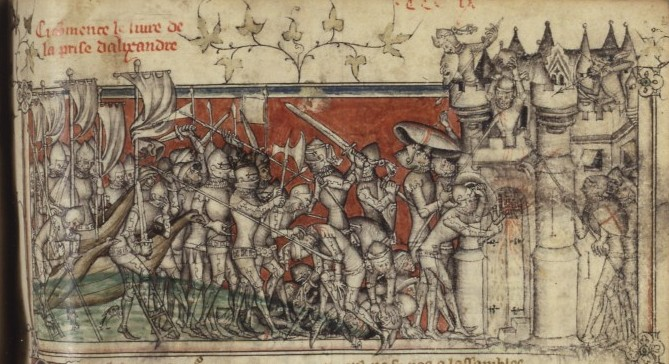
Sack of Alexandria (1365), from manuscript of the Prise d'Alexandrie by Guillaume de Machaut

Facing an untenable position with the Mamluk forces, the army withdrew three days later. Peter had wanted to stay and hold the city and use it as a beachhead for more crusades into Egypt, but his barons refused, wishing only to leave with their booty. Peter himself was one of the last to leave the city, only getting onto his ship when Mamluk soldiers entered the city. As a result of the attack, senior Mamluk emir Yalbugha al-Umari embarked on an ambitious ship-building program, completing 100 ships over the next year. Accounts of the crusade was given by Guillaume de Machaut in his La Prise d'Alexandre, and by Muslim historian and eyewitness to the crusade al-Nuwayrī in his Kitāb al-Ilmām.

=== Barbary Crusades: Mahadi, Tedelis, Bona ===
In the later 14th century, there were several crusades to North Africa. The Mahdia Crusade, also known as the Crusade of Louis II de Bourbon against Mahdia, was a Franco-Genoese military expedition in 1390 that led to the siege of Mahdia, a stronghold of the Barbary pirates. This is documented as part of Froissart's Chronicles. The Crusade of Tedelis was a major conflict within the overall struggle between Martin of Aragon and the Kingdom of Tlemcen in 1398. The Bona Crusade was a military campaign initiated by Martin of Aragon against the Hafsid sultanate, carried out in the summer of 1399.

=== Despenser's Crusade ===
The Great Schism within the Catholic Church from 1378–1417 led to a number of minor crusades. The best known of these is Despenser's Crusade of 1383, also known as the Norwich Crusade. This was a military expedition led by Henry le Despenser in order to assist Ghent in its struggle against the supporters of antipope Clement VII. The Siege of Ypres was unsuccessful, ending the crusade. In addition, a crusade was called after Charles III of Naples became king of Naples and titular king of Jerusalem in 1382 after having his cousin Joanna I of Naples strangled in jail. Clement VII granted crusade indulgences to Louis I of Anjou and others to dethrone Charles. A third example is that of John of Gaunt, who led an unsuccessful crusade against Henry of Trastámara to claim the throne of Castile by right of his wife Constance of Castile.

=== War of Chioggia ===
The Venetian–Genoese wars, begun in 1256, continued into the later 14th century. The War of Chioggia was the latest of these conflicts which lasted from 1378 to 1381. The war had mixed results. Venice and her allies won the war against their Italian rival states, however lost the war against Louis I of Hungary, which resulted in the Hungarian conquest of the Dalmatian cities. The Battle of Chioggia on 24 June 1380 resulted in a Venetian victory and the subsequent Treaty of Turin was signed by all parties on 8 August 1381.

=== Marchal Boucicaut's 1399 Expedition ===
In response to Byzantine Emperor Manuel II Palaeologus' pleads for help in 1397-1398, Charles VI of France sent his experienced commander Jean II le Meingre, 'Boucicaut' with a force of 1,000-1,200 disciplined knights, men-at-arms and archers to relieve Constantinople in 1399, then besieged by Ottoman forces. This small expedition successfully raided the Turkish military apparatus, preventing the fall of Constantinople. Following this success, the marchal and his French army, along with Manuel II and Venetian ships proceeded to raid the Turkish coast, burning down forts and ships, after which the expeditionary force returned home.

== Rise of the Ottoman Empire ==
By 1300, Osman I was leader of the Anatolian beylik that would become the Ottoman Empire and began engaging in the series of Byzantine-Ottoman Wars. The first major victory of the Ottomans over Byzantium was the Battle of Bapheus in 1302. After that, the Ottoman military activity was largely limited to raiding because they had not yet developed effective techniques for siege warfare. Although he is famous for his raids against the Byzantines, Osman also had many military confrontations with Tatar groups and with the neighboring principality of Germiyan.

=== Orhan ===
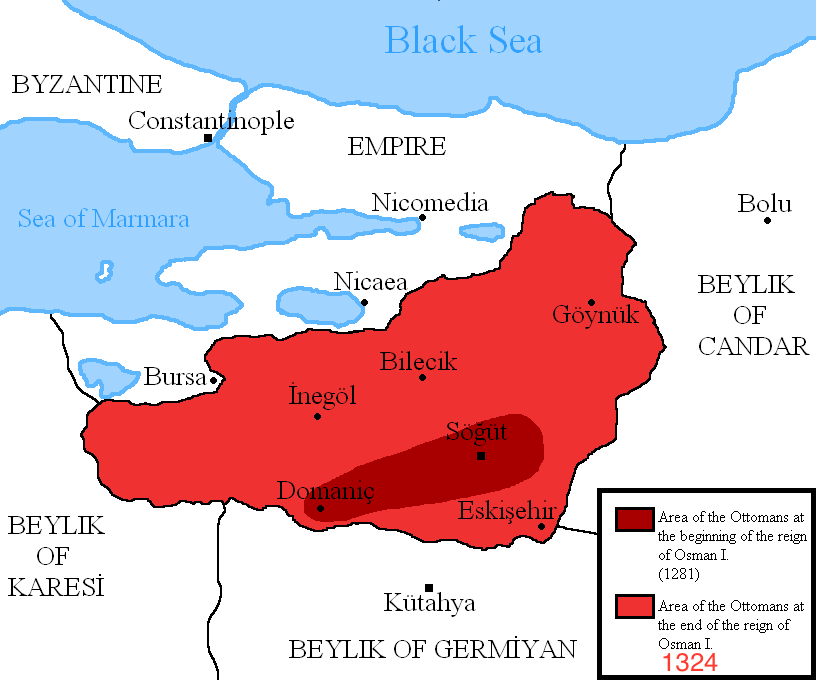
An estimation of the territory under the control of Osman.

Orhan succeeded his father upon his death around 1323. He oversaw the conquest of Bithynia's major towns, including Bursa in 1326. Bursa would become the first major capital city of the early Ottoman Empire, dangerously close to Constantinople. The first major military activity of Orhan was at the Siege of Nicaea, begun in 1328. Nicaea had been in Turkish hands since the First Crusade and had been in a state of intermittent blockade since 1301. The Ottomans lacked the ability to control access to the town through the lakeside harbour. As a result, the siege dragged on for several years without conclusion.

In 1329, Andronikos III Palaiologos attempted to break the siege. He led a relief force to drive the Ottomans away from both Nicomedia and Nicaea. After some minor successes, however, his forces suffered a reverse at the Battle of Pelekanon on 11 June 1329 and withdrew. When it was clear that no effective Imperial force would be able to restore the frontier and drive off the Ottomans, the city proper fell on 2 March 1331. Those inhabitants who wished to leave were permitted to do so, though few did. Nicea was left almost entirely ruined and depopulated.

Following the defeat at Nicaea in 1331, the loss of Nicomedia was only a matter of time for the Byzantines. Andronikos III attempted to bribe Orhan. In 1337, Orhan began the Siege of Nicomedia and it fell to the Ottomans. The second Byzantine civil war followed in 1341 with the death of Andronikos III and strife over his successor. Orhan's eldest son Süleyman Pasha commanded the Ottoman forces that led to the Fall of Gallipoli in 1354. After this, most Anatolian strongholds of Byzantium had been taken except Philadelphia, which was taken in 1390 after the Battle of Philadelphia. The civil war proved a critical turning point in the history of the empire and by the end of the third Byzantine civil war in 1357, Byzantium was an empire in name only.

=== Murad I ===
Süleyman Pasha was killed in a hunting accident in 1357, and so when Orhan died in 1362, his second son Murad I became the third sultan of the Ottoman Empire. Murad fought against the powerful Karamanids in Anatolia. To counter them, he married his son Bayezid I to the princess Devletşah Hatun, bringing Germiyanid territory under his control. He also battled against the Serbs, Albanians, Bulgarians and Hungarians in Eastern Europe. In particular, the Serbian expedition to expel the Turks from Adrianople led by brothers Vukašin and Uglješa, was halted at the Battle of Maritsa on 26 September 1371. In 1385, the Siege of Sofia left the city in Ottoman hands. In 1386, Lazar of Serbia defeated an Ottoman force at the Battle of Pločnik. The forces of the Kingdom of Bosnia, led by Vlatko Vuković, and the Ottomans under the leadership of Lala Şahin Pasha, clashed in 1388. The Ottoman army first attacked Hum, the kingdom's southern region. After days of looting, the invaders clashed with the defending Bosnians at the Battle of Bileća, northeast of Dubrovnik. The battle, fought in August 1388, ended with an Ottoman defeat.

Murad's son Savcı Bey and Andronikos IV Palaiologos, the son of emperor John V Palaiologos, joined in a rebellion against their fathers, resulting in the fourth Byzantine civil war from 1373–1379. At the end of the rebellion, Murad had his son executed and Andronikos IV was blinded in one eye.

==== Savoyard Crusade ====
In 1366, Amadeus VI of Savoy, known as the Green Count of Savoy, launched the Savoyard Crusade against Thrace and Bulgaria. The crusade was born out of the same planning that led to the Alexandrian Crusade and was the brainchild of Urban V. It was directed against the growing Ottoman Empire in eastern Europe and he attacked Murad I with 15 ships and 1,700 men in 1366 in order to aid his cousin, John V Palaiologos. Although intended as a collaboration with the Kingdom of Hungary and the Byzantine Empire, the crusade was diverted from its main purpose to attack the Second Bulgarian Empire. There the crusaders made small gains that they handed over to the Byzantines. It did take back some territory from the Ottomans in the vicinity of Constantinople and on Gallipoli. The success at Gallipoli was short-lived as the Ottomans recaptured it in 1376.

==== Battle of Kosovo ====
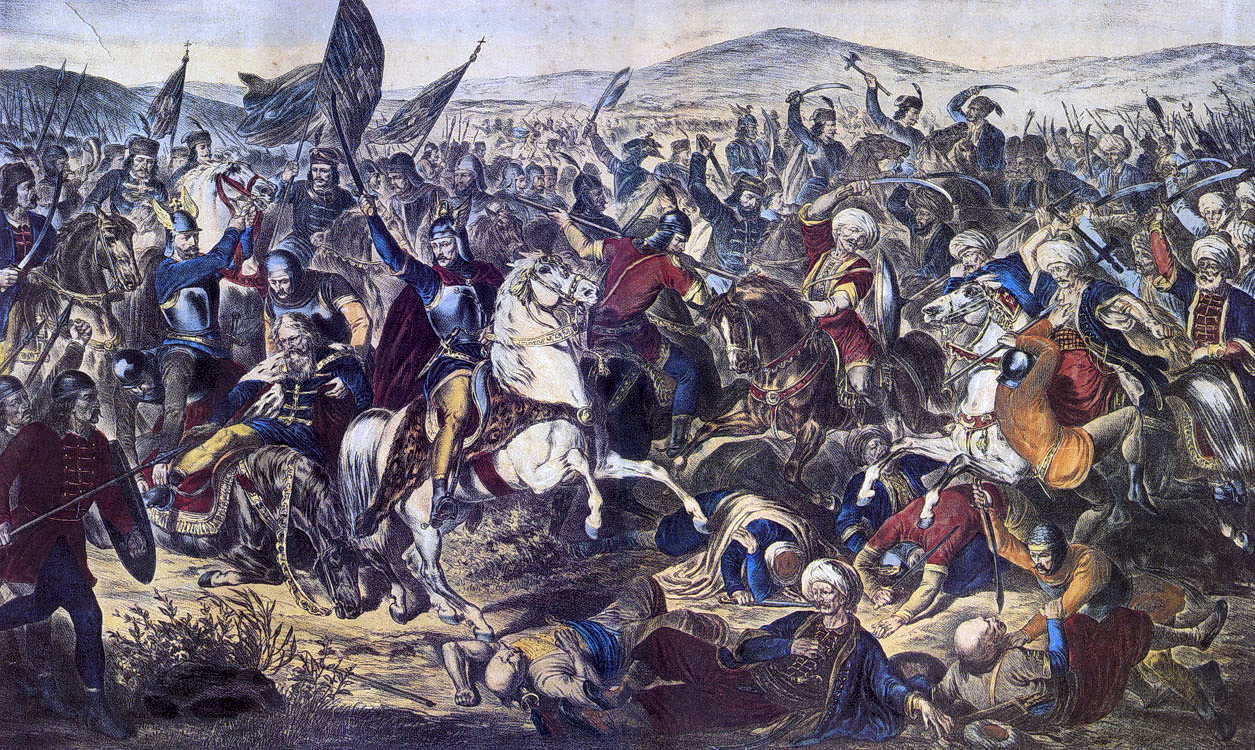
Battle of Kosovo, by Adam Stefanović (1870).

The Battle of Kosovo took place on 15 June 1389 between an army led by Lazar of Serbia and an invading army of the Ottoman Empire under the direct command of the sultan Murad I. The battle was fought on the Kosovo field in the territory ruled by Serbian nobleman Vuk Branković. The army under Lazar consisted of his own troops, a contingent led by Branković, and a contingent sent from Bosnia by Tvrtko I, commanded by Vlatko Vuković. Prince Lazar was the ruler of Moravian Serbia and the most powerful among the Serbian regional lords of the time, while Branković ruled the District of Branković and other areas, recognizing Lazar as his overlord. The bulk of both armies were wiped out, and both Lazar and Murad were killed. However, Serbian manpower was depleted and had no capacity to field large armies against future Ottoman campaigns, which relied on new reserve forces from Anatolia. Consequently, the Serbian principalities that were not already Ottoman vassals, became so in the following years.

=== Bayezid I ===
In 1389, Bayezid I ascended to the throne following the death of his father Murad I, who was killed by Serbian knight Miloš Obilić at Kosovo. Immediately after obtaining the throne, he had his younger brother Yakub Çelebi strangled to avoid any potential coup as had been attempted by their brother Savcı Bey. In 1390, Bayezid took as his third wife princess Olivera Despina, the daughter of Lazar of Serbia, who also lost his life in Kosovo. Bayezid recognized Stefan Lazarević, the son of Lazar, as the new Serbian leader with considerable autonomy. Shortly thereafter, Manuel II Palaeologus succeeded his father John V as Byzantine emperor.

==== Unification of Anatolia ====
In a campaign over the summer and fall of 1390, Bayezid conquered the beyliks of Aydin, Saruhan and Menteshe. His main rivals were Ala' al-Din ibn Halin and İsfendiyar Bey. They initially allied with Kadi Burhan al-Din, vizier to the Eretnids, who had proclaimed himself sultan of the remaining Turkish beyliks. Nevertheless, Bayezid pushed on and overwhelmed the rest of Anatolia. At this point, Bayezid accepted peace proposals from Ala' al-Din in 1391, concerned that further advances would antagonize his Turkoman followers and lead them to ally with Kadi Burhan al-Din. Once peace had been made with Karaman, Bayezid moved north against Kastamonu which had given refuge to many fleeing from his forces, and conquered both that city as well as Sinop. However, his subsequent campaign was stopped at the Battle of Kırkdilim in 1392 where he was accompanied by his vassal Manuel II Palaeologus. In 1394, Bayezid crossed the Danube to attack Wallachia, ruled at that time by Mircea the Elder. The Ottomans were superior in number, but in 1395 at the Battle of Rovine, on forested and swampy terrain, the Wallachians won the fierce battle and prevented Bayezid's army from advancing.

==== Crusade of Nicopolis ====
Bayezid began the construction of the Anadoluhisarı fortress as part of preparations for the Siege of Constantinople, which began in 1394. On the urgings of Manuel II Palaeologus, a new crusade was organized to defeat him. In 1396, the crusader army of Hungarian, Croatian, Bulgarian, French and German forces, assisted by the Venetian navy, were under the leadership of Sigismund of Luxembourg, then king of Hungary. The Ottomans were led by Bayezid and his vizier Çandarlızade Ali Pasha, with the military leaders Ottoman general Evrenos and the Serbian prince Stefan Lazarević. In what is referred to as the Crusade of Nicopolis, one of the last large-scale crusades, the Christian forces were soundly defeated in the Battle of Nicopolis on 25 September 1396. Bayezid built the magnificent Ulu Cami in Bursa to celebrate this victory, which led to the end of the Second Bulgarian Empire.

== Timur and the Ottoman Interregnum ==
While Bayezid was engaged in Wallachia, Ala' al-Din invaded Ottoman territory once more and attempted to take Ankara, in Ottoman hands since 1356. In 1398, the sultan returned to Anatolia and, disregarding Ala' al-Din's calls for peace, captured the Karamanid capital of Konya and had Ala' al-Din executed. In 1398, the sultan conquered the territory of Burhan al-Din, violating the accord with he had with Timur.

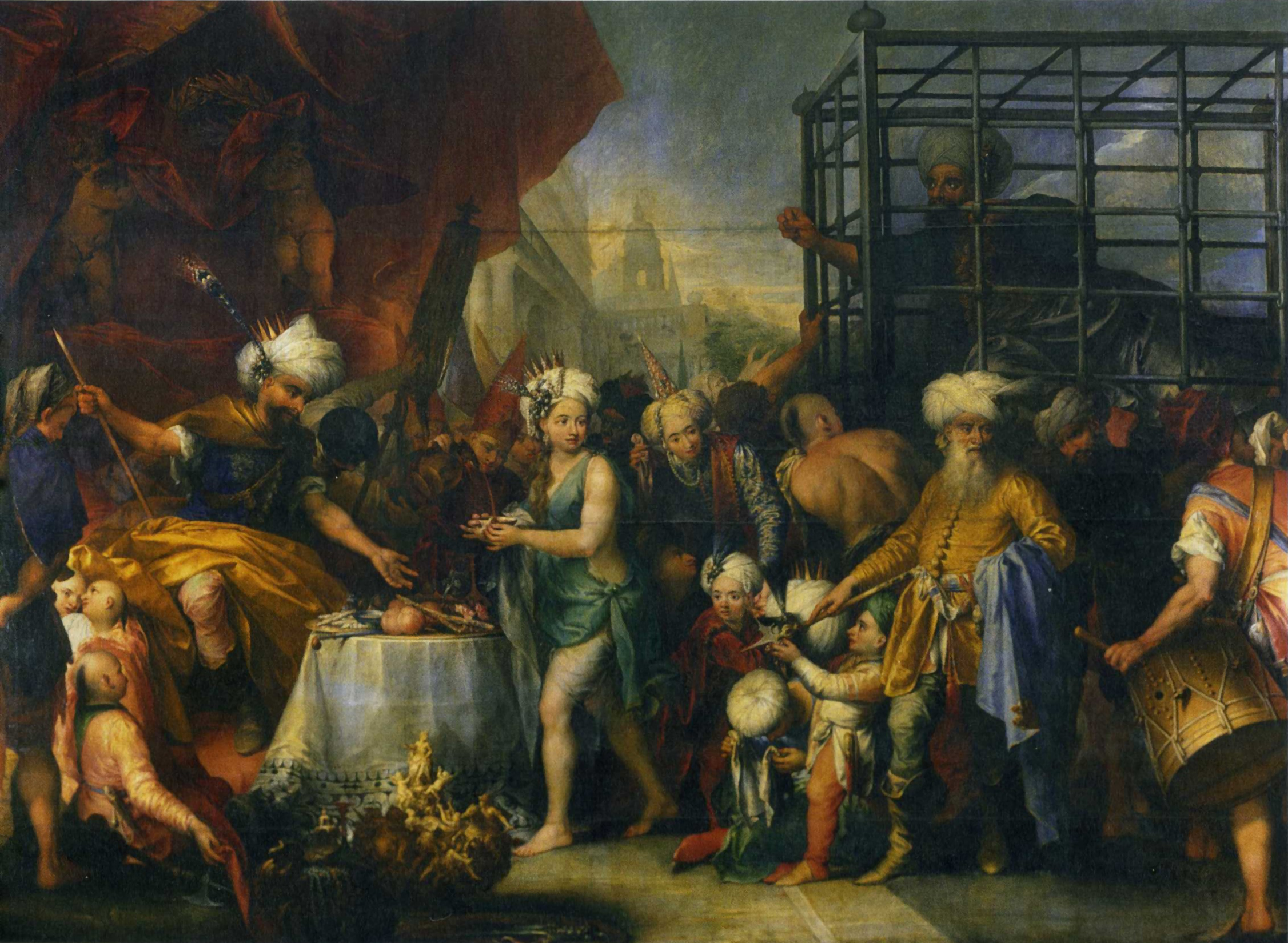
Humiliation of Despina and Bayezid, by Andrea Celesti

Timur was a Turco-Mongol conqueror who founded the Timurid Empire in and around modern-day Afghanistan, Iran, and Central Asia, beginning in 1363. An undefeated commander, he is widely regarded as one of the greatest military leaders and tacticians in history, as well as one of the most brutal. By the end of the fourteenth century, Timur was challenging both the Mamluks and the Ottomans in the Levant and Anatolia. His forces defeated those of an-Nasir Faraj at the Sack of Aleppo and the Siege of Damascus in 1400, followed by the capture of the Ottoman city of Sebaste.

Timur succeeded in convincing the local Turkic beyliks who had been vassals of the Ottomans to join him in his attack on Bayezid, who had become the most powerful ruler in the Muslim world. Years of insulting letters had passed between Timur and Bayezid. Both rulers insulted each other in their own way while Timur preferred to undermine Bayezid's position as a ruler and play down the significance of his military successes.

In 1402, Bayezid broke off of his Siege of Constantinople and marched to Ankara. The resulting Battle of Ankara on 20 July 1402 was resounding victory for the Timurids. Bayezid and his wife Olivera were captured, with the sultan dying in captivity in 1403. This was followed by Siege of Smyrna in December 1402 in which Timur defeated the Hospitallers, taking the city held by them since 1344.

The death of Bayezid led to a civil war in the empire among his sons. This led to the Ottoman Interregnum which would last until 1413. The death of Timur in 1405 would limit the gains that the Timurid empire would see, and the Ottoman Empire would expand throughout the fifteenth century.

== See also ==
- Bahri dynasty of Mamluks
- Byzantine civil wars
- Byzantine-Ottoman wars
- Chronology of the Crusades
- Criticism of crusading
- Crusader states
- History of the Knights Hospitaller
- History of the Knights Templar
- Hospitaller conquest of Rhodes
- Kingdom of Jerusalem
- List of Crusades
- Mongol Empire
- Ottoman Empire
- Timurid Empire

== Bibliography ==
- Amitai-Preiss, Reuven (1995). Mongols and Mamluks: The Mamluk-Îlkhânid War, 1260–1281. Cambridge University Press. ISBN 9780521462266.
- Amitai-Preiss, Reuven (1999). The Mongol Empire and Its Legacy. Brill. ISBN 9789004110489.
- Asbridge, Thomas (2012). The Crusades: The War for the Holy Land. Simon & Schuster. ISBN 9781849836883.
- Atiya, Aziz Suryal (1934). The Crusade of Nicopolis. Methuen & Company, Limited. ISBN 9780404154103.
- Atiya, Aziz Suryal (1938). The Crusade in the Later Middle Ages. Methuen. ISBN 9780527037000.
- Atiya, Aziz Suryal (1975a). The Crusade in the Fourteenth Century (PDF). A History of the Crusades (Setton), Volume III.
- Atiya, Aziz Suryal (1975b). The Aftermath of the Crusades (PDF). A History of the Crusades (Setton), Volume III.
- Barber, Malcolm (2006). The Trial of the Templars. Cambridge University Press. ISBN 9781107645769.
- Bishko, Charles Julian (1975). The Spanish and Portuguese Reconquest, 1095-1492 (PDF). A History of the Crusades (Setton), Volume III.
- Bosworth, Clifford Edmund (2004). The New Islamic dynasties: A Chronological and Genealogical Manual. Edinburgh University Press. ISBN 9780748621378.
- Bryce, James (1892). The Holy Roman Empire. London, Macmillan and co.
- Buttigieg, Emanuel; Phillips, Simon (2016). Islands and Military Orders, c.1291-c.1798. Routledge. ISBN 9781317111962.
- Cahen, Claude (1969). The Mongols and the Near East (PDF). A History of the Crusades (Setton), Volume II.
- Chasin, Martin (1989). The Crusade of Varna (PDF). A History of the Crusades (Setton), Volume VI.
- Chaytor, Henry John (1933). A History of Aragon and Catalonia. Methuen. ISBN 9780404014797.
- Cox, Eugene L. (1967). The Green Count of Savoy, Amadeus VI and Transalpine Savoy in the Fourteenth Century. Princeton University Press. ISBN 9780691051253.
- Delaville Le Roulx, Joseph (1904). Les Hospitaliers en Terre Sainte et à Chypre (1100–1310). E. Leroux, Paris.
- Demurger, Alain (2009). The Last Templar: The Tragedy of Jacques de Molay. Profile Books. ISBN 9781846682247.
- Edbury, Peter W. (1991). The Kingdom of Cyprus and the Crusades, 1191–1374. Cambridge University Press. ISBN 9780521268769.
- Frale, Barbara (2011). The Templars: The Secret History Revealed. Arcade. ISBN 9781611450194.
- France, John (2006). The Crusades and the Expansion of Catholic Christendom, 1000-1714. Routledge. ISBN 9781134196180.
- Geanakoplos, Deno John (1975a). Byzantium and the Crusades, 1261–1354 (PDF). A History of the Crusades (Setton), Volume III.
- Geanakoplos, Deno John (1975b). Byzantium and the Crusades, 1354–1453 (PDF). A History of the Crusades (Setton), Volume III.
- Georgiou, Constantinos (2018). Preaching the Crusades to the Eastern Mediterranean: Propaganda, Liturgy and Diplomacy. Routledge. ISBN 9780367592523.
- Ghazarian, Jacob G. (2000). The Armenian Kingdom in Cilicia During the Crusades. Curzon. ISBN 9780700714186.
- Grousset, René (1934). Histoire des croisades et du royaume franc de Jérusalem. Plon, Paris.
- Grousset, René (1935). L'Épopée des croisades. Le Club français du livre. Histoire,38. Paris: le Club français du livre.
- Grousset, René (1970). The Empire of the Steppes: A History of Central Asia. Translated by Naomi Walford. Rutgers University Press. ISBN 9780813513041.
- Hazard, Harry W. (1975). Moslem North Africa, 1049–1394 (PDF). A History of the Crusades (Setton), Volume III.
- Hazlitt, William Carew (1900). The Venetian Republic. A. and C. Black, London.
- Housley, Norman (1986). The Avignon Papacy and the Crusades, 1305-1378. Clarendon Press. ISBN 9780198219576.
- Housley, Norman (1992). The Later Crusades, 1274-1580: From Lyons to Alcazar. Oxford University Press. ISBN 9780198221371.
- Howarth, Stephen (1982). Knights Templar. Marboro Books, New York. ISBN 9780002164528.
- Imber, Colin (2002). The Ottoman Empire. ISBN 9780333613863.
- İnalcık, Halil (1989). The Ottoman Turks and the Crusades, 1329–1451 (PDF). A History of the Crusades (Setton), Volume VI.
- Irwin, Robert (1986). The Middle East in the Middle Ages: The Early Mamluk Sultanate, 1250–1382. Southern Illinois University Press. ISBN 9781597400480.
- Jackson, Peter (2005). The Mongols and the West: 1221–1410. Pearson Longman. ISBN 9780582368965.
- Kastritsis, Dimitris (2007). The Sons of Bayezid. Brill. ISBN 9789047422471.
- Kurkjian, Vahan M. (1958). History of Armenia. Armenian General Benevolent Union of America.
- Lane-Poole, Stanley (1901). History of Egypt in the Middle Ages. A History of Egypt; v. 6. Methuen, London. ISBN 9780790532042.
- Leopold, Antony R. (2000). How to Recover the Holy Land: The Crusade Proposals of the Late Thirteenth and Early Fourteenth Centuries. Ashgate. ISBN 9780754601203.
- Laiou, Angeliki E. (2002), "Political History: An Outline", in Laiou, Angeliki E. (ed.), The Economic History of Byzantium: From the Seventh through the Fifteenth Century, Dumbarton Oaks, ISBN 9780884023326
- Lock, Peter (1995). The Franks in the Aegean 1204-1500. Routledge. ISBN 9780582051393.
- Lock, Peter (2006). The Routledge Companion to the Crusades. Routledge. doi:10.4324/9780203389638. ISBN 0-415-39312-4.
- Luke, Harry (1975a). The Kingdom of Cyprus, 1291–1369 (PDF). A History of the Crusades (Setton), Volume III.
- Luke, Harry (1975b). The Kingdom of Cyprus, 1369–1489 (PDF). A History of the Crusades (Setton), Volume III.
- Luttrell, Anthony T. (1975). The Hospitallers at Rhodes, 1306–1421 (PDF). A History of the Crusades (Setton), Volume III.
- Mazor, Amir (2015). The Rise and Fall of a Muslim Regiment: The Mansuriyya in the First Mamluk Sultanate, 1279–1341. Vandenhoeck & Ruprecht Unipress. ISBN 9783847004240.
- Menache, Sophia (1998). Clement V. Cambridge University Press. ISBN 9780521521987.
- Michaud, Joseph–François (1881). The history of the Crusades. Translated by William Robson. Published by George Routledge and Sons.
- Miller, William (1983). Essays on the Latin Orient. AMS Press. ISBN 9780404170240.
- Murray, Alan V. (2006). The Crusades—An Encyclopedia. ABC-CLIO. ISBN 9781576078624.
- Murray, Alan V. (2009). The Clash of Cultures on the Medieval Baltic Frontier. Ashgate. ISBN 9780754664833.
- Mutafian, Claude; Otten-Froux, Catherine (1993). Le Royaume Arménien de Cilicie. University of Michigan. ISBN 9782271051059.
- Nicol, Donald M. (1993). The Last Centuries of Byzantium, 1261–1453. Cambridge University Press. ISBN 9780521439916.
- Nicolle, David (2005). Acre 1291: Bloody Sunset of the Crusader States. Bloomsbury USA. ISBN 9781841768625.
- Northrup, Linda (1998). From Slave to Sultan: The Career of Al-Manṣūr Qalāwūn and the Consolidation of Mamluk Rule in Egypt and Syria (1279-1290). Franz Steiner Verlag. ISBN 9783515068611.
- Phillips, Jenna Rebecca (2017). The Capetian Century, 1214-1314. Brepols. ISBN 9782503567181.
- Phillips, J. R. S. (2010). Edward II. Yale University Press. ISBN 9780300156577.
- Plum, Harry Grant (1906). The Teutonic order and its secularization. Iowa university, Bulletin, 1906 new series,no. 128. Iowa City, the University.
- Richard, Jean C. (1979). The Latin Kingdom of Jerusalem. Amsterdam, North Holland. ISBN 9780444852625.
- Richard, Jean C. (1999). The Crusades, c. 1071 – c. 1291. Cambridge University Press. ISBN 9780521625661.
- Riley-Smith, Jonathan (2001). The Oxford Illustrated History of The Crusades. Oxford University Press. ISBN 9780192854285.
- Riley-Smith, Jonathan (2012). The Knights Hospitaller in the Levant, c. 1070 – 1309. Palgrave Macmillan. ISBN 9781137264756.
- Roux, Jean-Paul (1993). Histoire de l'Empire mongol. Fayard. ISBN 9782213031644.
- Runciman, Steven (1954). A History of the Crusades, Volume Three: The Kingdom of Acre and the Later Crusades. Cambridge University Press. ISBN 9780521347723.
- Runciman, Steven (1969). The Crusader States, 1243–1291 (PDF). A History of the Crusades (Setton), Volume II.
- Runciman, Steven (2009). Lost Capital of Byzantium The History of Mistra and the Peloponnese. I. B. Tauris. ISBN 9780857718105.
- Schein, Sylvia (1991). Fideles Crucis: The Papacy, the West, and the Recovery of the Holy Land, 1274–1314. Clarendon Press. ISBN 9780198221654.
- Setton, Kenneth M. (1969). A History of the Crusades. University of Wisconsin Press.
- Setton, Kenneth M. (1975a). The Catalans in Greece, 1311–1380 (PDF). A History of the Crusades (Setton), Volume III.
- Setton, Kenneth M. (1975b). The Catalans and Florentines in Greece, 1380–1462 (PDF). A History of the Crusades (Setton), Volume III.
- Setton, Kenneth M. (1976). The Papacy and the Levant, 1204–1571, Volume I: The thirteenth and fourteenth centuries. American Philosophical Society. ISBN 9780871691149.
- Sinor, Denis (1975). The Mongols and Western Europe (PDF). A History of the Crusades (Setton), Volume III.
- Stewart, Angus Donal (2001). The Armenian Kingdom and the Mamluks. Brill. ISBN 9789004122925.
- Throop, Palmer A. (1975). Criticism of the Crusade: A Study of Public Opinion and Crusade Propaganda. Porcupine Press. ISBN 9780879916183.
- Topping, Peter (1975a). The Morea, 1311–1364 (PDF). A History of the Crusades (Setton), Volume III.
- Topping, Peter (1975b). The Morea, 1364–1460 (PDF). A History of the Crusades (Setton), Volume III.
- Tyerman, Christopher (1985). "Philip VI and the Recovery of the Holy Land". The English Historical Review. 100 (394): 25–52. doi:10.1093/ehr/C.CCCXCIV.25. JSTOR 569926.
- Tyerman, Christopher (1996). England and the Crusades, 1095–1588. University of Chicago Press. ISBN 0226820122.
- Tyerman, Christopher (2006). God's War: A New History of the Crusades. Belknap Press. ISBN 9780674023871.
- Villari, Pasquale (1910). Mediaeval Italy from Charlemagne to Henry VII. London: T. Fisher Unwin.
- Waterson, James (2007). The Knights of Islam: The Wars of the Mamluks. London: Greenhill Books. ISBN 9781853677342.
- Wolff, Robert Lee (1969). The Latin Empire of Constantinople, 1204–1312 (PDF). A History of the Crusades (Setton), Volume II.
- Woodhouse, F. C. (1879). Teutonic Knights. The Home library. In The Military Religious Orders of the Middle Ages.
- Ziyādaẗ, Muḥammad Muṣṭafā (1969). The Mamluk Sultans to 1293 (PDF). A History of the Crusades (Setton), Volume II.
- Ziyādaẗ, Muḥammad Muṣṭafā (1975). The Mamluk Sultans, 1291–1517 (PDF). A History of the Crusades (Setton), Volume III.
