= William of Paris (inquisitor) =

Dominican inquisitor

William of Paris, O.P. (died 1314), was a Dominican priest and theologian.

William composed the Diologus de Septem Sacramentis at St. Jacques Convent in Paris between 1310 and 1314.

He was confessor of Philip IV of France.

He was made inquisitor of France in 1303, and began a campaign against the Templars in 1307. The arrest of the Templars led Pope Clement V to suspend William's powers after a complaint by Edward II of England, but Phillip's "bold and comtemptuous" written reply caused the Pope to back down and reinstate William.

In 1310, William presided over the trial of Marguerite Porete.
