= Chronology of the later Crusades through 1400 =

The chronology of the later Crusades through 1400 provides a detailed timeline of the Crusades from after the Eighth Crusade, the last of the major expeditions to the Holy Land through the end of the 14th century. This includes the events from 1270 on that led to the Fall of Outremer in 1291 and the Crusades after Acre, 1291–1399.

== Chronologies of the Crusades in print ==
Numerous chronologies of the Crusades have been published and include the following.

- A Chronology of the Crusades, covering the crusades from 1055 to 1456, by Timothy Venning.
- Chronology and Maps, covering 1095–1789, in The Oxford History of the Crusades, edited by Jonathan Riley-Smith.
- A Chronological Outline of the Crusades: Background, Military Expeditions, and Crusader States, covering 160–1798, in The Routledge Companion to the Crusades, by Peter Lock.
- A Narrative Outline of the Crusades, covering 1096–1488, ibid.
- The Crusades: A Chronology, covering 1096–1444, in The Crusades—An Encyclopedia, edited by Alan V. Murray.
- Important Dates and Events, 1049–1571, in History of the Crusades, Volume III, edited by Kenneth M. Setton (1975).
- Historical Dictionary of the Crusades, by Corliss K. Slack. Chronology from 1009 to 1330.
- Oxford Reference Timelines: Crusades, 1095–1303; Byzantine Empire, 330 – c. 1480; Ottoman Empire, c. 1295 – 1923.

== 13th century ==
=== Prior events ===
- 24 October 1260. Baibars becomes Mamluk sultan.
- 15 August 1261. Michael VIII Palaiologos begins the Palaiologan dynasty, to rule the Byzantine Empire until 1453.
- 8 February 1265. Abaqa becomes second to rule the Mongol Ilkhanate after the death of his father Hulagu Khan.
- 5 January 1266. Charles I of Anjou and Beatrice of Provence are crowned king and queen of Sicily.
- 24 September 1269. Hugh III of Cyprus is elected and crowned king of Jerusalem. The claim of Maria of Antioch to the throne is rejected.

=== 1270 ===
- 17 August. Philip of Montfort is killed by Assassins on the orders of Baibars.
- 25 August. Louis IX of France dies while on the Eighth Crusade and succeeded by his son Philip III of France.
- 21 October. Hethum I of Armenia abdicates and is succeeded by his son Leo II.

1271

- Spring. Baibars besieges Safita in February, then takes Krak des Chevaliers, Gibelacar and Tripoli.
- Late May. Baibars offers Bohemond VI of Antioch a ten-year truce after the Siege of Tripoli.
- 1 September. Gregory X is elected pope, and preaches new crusade in coordination with the Mongols.

1272

- 21 February. Charles I of Anjou is proclaimed king of Albania.
- 12 May. Lord Edward's Crusade, the last major crusade to the Holy Land, ends inconclusively with a ten-year truce with Baibars. Edward attacked by an Assassin the next month.
- 20 November. Edward I of England becomes king after the death of his father Henry III three days earlier.

1273

- 22 January. Muhammad II of Granada becomes the Nasrid ruler of the Emirate of Granada.
- 11 March. Gregory X issues papal bull Dudum super generalis asking for information on Islamic threats to Christendom.
- Early. Haymo Létrange puts Beirut and their ruler Isabella of Beirut under the protection of Baibars.
- July. Al-Kahf, the last Assassin stronghold in Syria, falls to Mamluks.
- 1 October. Rudolf I of Germany elected king, ending the Great Interregnum.
- October. Philip of Courtenay becomes Latin Emperor upon the death of Baldwin II.
- (Date unknown). William of Tripoli publishes De statu Saracenorum in response to the papal bull serving as a handbook for the Christian missionary on the history, law and beliefs of Islam.

1274

- Early. Gregory X receives reports on the failure of the crusades including Gilbert of Tournai's Collectio de scandalis ecclesiae, Bruno of Olomouc's Relatio de statu ecclesiae in regno alemaniae, and the Opus tripartitum of Humbert of Romans.
- 7 May – 17 July. Second Council of Lyon discusses reconquest of the Holy Land. Representatives of the Ilkhanate attend and Union of churches approved.
- (Date unknown). Geoffrey of Beaulieu writes his biography of Louis IX of France, The Life of Saint Louis, as directed by the pope.

1275

- March. Baibars continues his campaign against Armenia and demands the return of the Christian half of Latakia.
- 13 May. Marinid forces led by Abu Yusuf Yaqub begin their first Invasion of Spain.
- 4 June. Hugh III negotiates a truce with Baibars that protects Latakia in exchange for an annual tribute.
- Spring. Marco Polo arrives at the court of Kublai Khan.
- (Date unknown). Philip III of France and Rudolf I of Germany take the cross without corresponding action.

1276

- 10 January. Gregory X dies. Innocent V elected pope on 21 January, dies on 22 June.
- 19 January. Abu Yusuf Yaqub ends his invasion of Spain, and, with Muhammad II of Granada, agrees to a truce with Alfonso X of Castile for two years.
- 11 July. Adrian V elected pope under the influence of Charles I of Anjou, dies five weeks later.
- 27 August. James I of Aragon dies, and is succeeded by his son Peter III of Aragon.
- 8 September. John XXI elected pope, dies after just eight months.
- October. Templars purchase La Fauconnerie (La Féve), omitting to secure Hugh's consent.
- October. Hugh III relocates from Acre to Cyprus.

1277

- January/March. Philip of Sicily dies and title to Principality of Achaea reverts to his father Charles I of Anjou.
- 18 March. Charles I of Anjou secures the disputed title of king by purchasing Maria of Antioch's claim to the throne of Jerusalem.
- 15 April. Mamluk force defeats Mongol occupying force at the Battle of Elbistan.
- 1 July. Baibars dies, succeeded by sons Barakah and then Solamish.
- August. Abu Yusuf Yaqub begins his second Invasion of Spain, ravaging the districts of Jerez de la Frontera, Seville and Córdoba.
- 25 November. Nicholas III elected pope after the death of John XXI on 20 May 1277.

1278

- January. Charles I of Anjou crowned king of Jerusalem at Acre and is recognized by the kingdom's barons. He appoints Roger of San Severino as his representative.
- 1 May. William of Villehardouin dies and his lands in Achaea revert to Charles I of Anjou.
- 24 May. Charles I of Anjou swears fealty to Nicholas III and promises not to invade the Byzantine Empire.
- 25 July. Castile defeated by the Marinids at the naval Battle off Algeciras.
- 5 August. Alfonso X of Castile launches the unsuccessful first Siege of Algeciras.

1279

- 16 February. Alfonso III of Portugal dies and is succeeded by his son Denis of Portugal.
- 5 March. Teutonic Knights defeated by Grand Duchy of Lithuania at the Battle of Aizkraukle.
- November. Qalawun becomes Mamluk sultan after deposing Solamish.

=== 1280 ===
- April–June. Sunqur al-Ashqar, Mamluk governor of Damascus, revolts against Cairo. He flees after Qalawun invades the city.
- 23 June. Granada defeats Castile and León at the Battle of Moclín.
- 22 August. Nicholas III dies suddenly, and the 1280–1281 papal election begins on 22 September.
- 29 October. Mongols sack Aleppo.

1281

- 22 February. Martin IV elected pope.
- 10 April. Michael VIII Palaiologos excommunicated by Martin IV who renounces union of churches approved at Lyon in 1274.
- 3 May. Qalawun renews truce with the Kingdom of Jerusalem for another ten years.
- 16 July. Bohemond VII of Tripoli agrees to Qalawun's truce for the County of Tripoli.
- 29 October. Mamluks defeat a coalition of Mongols, Armenians and Hospitallers at the second Battle of Homs.

1282

- January. Bohemond VII kills Guy II Embriaco, alienating the Genoese.
- 30 March. The War of the Sicilian Vespers begins with European powers and the papacy vying for control of Sicily.
- 28 April. Charles I of Anjou's fleet at Messina sunk, Mategriffon castle forced to surrender.
- 1 May. Guelphs and Ghibellines fight at the Battle of Forti, with the Guelph army defeated.
- 6 May. Tekuder becomes ruler of the Ilkhanate after the death of his brother Abaqa on 1 April, and soon converts to Islam taking the name Ahmad.
- 25 August. Tekuder sends embassy to Qalawun seeking alliance.
- 30 August. Peter III of Aragon lands in Sicily, claims crown four days later and is excommunicated by Martin IV.
- September/October. Hungary defeats the Cumans at the Battle of Lake Hód.
- 11 December. Andronikos II Palaiologos becomes Byzantine emperor, succeeding Michael VIII Palaiologos.
- (Date unknown). Roger of Lauria named commander of the Aragonese fleet.
- (Date unknown). George Akropolites publishes Annales (Chronike Syngraphe), the main Greek source for the period 1203–1261.

1283

- 13 January. Martin IV declares the Aragonese Crusade against Peter III of Aragon.
- Before 5 March. Ata-Malik Juvayni writes Tarīkh-i Jahān-gushā (History of the World Conqueror), an account of the Mongol Empire.
- 8 July 1283, Roger of Lauria defeats the Angevins at the Battle of Malta.
- Late July. Hugh III of Cyprus sails for Acre, arriving in August to lukewarm reception.
- Summer. Prussian rebellion against Teutonic Knights collapses.
- (Date unknown). Burchard of Mount Sion writes Descriptio Terrae Sanctae (Description of the Holy Land) of his travels in Syria, Egypt and Armenia.

1284

- 4 March. Hugh III dies in Tyre, his son John I of Cyprus crowned king of Jerusalem two months later. John is recognized as king only in Beirut and Tyre.
- 4 April. Alfonso X of Castile dies and is succeeded by his son Sancho IV of Castile.
- 5 June. Roger of Lauria defeats the Neapolitan fleet at the Battle of the Gulf of Naples, capturing the commander Charles II of Naples.
- 5–6 August. Pisa is ruined after loss to Genoa at the naval Battle of Meloria.
- 11 August. Arghun becomes the fourth ruler of the Ilkhanate after the murder of his uncle Tekuder. He relies on advice from the patriarch Yahballaha III.

1285

- 7 January. Charles I of Anjou dies and is succeeded by his son Charles II of Naples, who also claims the crown of Jerusalem.
- 28 March. Martin IV dies, Honorius IV elected pope on 2 April.
- 25 April – 24 May. Mamluks capture of the Hospitaller castle at Marqab.
- 20 May. John I of Cyprus dies, his brother Henry II of Cyprus crowned king of Cyprus.
- 26 June. Philip III invades Aragon in response to call to crusade of 1282.
- 4 September. Argonese fleet commanded by Roger of Lauria defeats a French and Genoese at the Battle of Les Formigues.
- 1 October. Aragonese defeat the French at the Battle of the Col de Panissars.
- 5 October. Philip IV of France becomes king upon the death of his father Philip III.
- Winter. Teutonic Knights launch the Lithuanian Crusade.
- (Date unknown). Arghun writes to Honorius IV proposing a military alliance against the Muslims.

1286

- March. Abu Yaqub Yusuf an-Nasr becomes Marinid sultan of Morocco upon the death of his father.
- 24 June. Henry II returns to Acre.
- 29 July. Angevin bailli Odo Poilechien, loyal to Charles II, hands the citadel over to Henry II at the insistence of the three military orders.
- 15 August. Henry II crowned king of Jerusalem at Tyre. A few weeks later, he returns to Cyprus after appointing Philip of Ibelin as regent.

1287

- 22 March. Major earthquake strikes Syria causing serious damage to the walls of Latakia.
- 3 April. Honorius IV dies, Rome enters into lengthy 1287–1288 papal election.
- Easter. Arghun's ambassador to the West Rabban Bar Sauma enters Constantinople.
- 20 April. Qalawun takes Latakia, claiming it is not covered by the truce of 1281.
- 31 May. Genoese fleet defeats Pisan, Venetian fleet at Acre, begins blockade.
- 18 June. Rabban Bar Sauma records the eruption of Mount Vesuvius.
- 23 June. Aragon defeats Naples at the naval Battle of the Counts.
- 19 October. Bohemond VII of Tripoli dies, succeeded by his sister Lucia of Tripoli.
- 6 December. Third Mongol raid into Poland begins.

1288

- Early. Lucia and her husband Narjot de Toucy arrive in Acre.
- February. Mongols repulsed by Poland.
- 22 February. Nicholas IV becomes pope, immediately supports a crusade to the Holy Land.
- 8 August. Nicholas IV declares a crusade against Ladislaus IV of Hungary.
- 28 October. Edward I enters into the Treaty of Canfranc with Alfonso III of Aragon to secure the release of Charles II of Naples, captured four years before.
- (Date unknown). Nicholas IV sends envoy Giovanni da Montecorvino to Persia and China.

1289

- 27 March – 26 April. Mamluk sultan Qalawan begins the Siege of Tripoli, causing the fall of one of the last remnants of the kingdom in the Levant a month later.
- Easter. Arghun sends Buscarello de Ghizolfi to Italy and France to announce that he intends to invade Syria in 1291.
- May. Fort Nephin and Le Boutron occupied by Qalawan. Peter Embriaco allowed to retain his estates in Tripoli.
- September. Jean de Grailly is sent to the West to appeal for help.
- (Date unknown). Osman I forms what is to become the Ottoman Empire.
- (Date unknown). Leo II of Armenia dies and is succeeded by his son Hethum II of Armenia.

=== 1290 ===
- 10 February. Nicholas IV calls for a crusade against the Mamluks.
- August. Venetian and Aragonese crusaders arrive at Acre, and instigate a massacre of Muslims in the city.
- Fall. Egyptian army mobilizes towards Acre.
- 4 November. Qalawun leaves Cairo for Syria, en route to Acre. He dies six days later.
- 10 November. Qalawun's son al-Ashraf Khalil becomes Mamluk sultan.

1291

- 12 March. Mongol Ieader Arghun dies, destabilizing the Ilkhanate.
- 4 April – 18 May. Crusaders lose their last stronghold in the Holy Land when Mamluk sultan Khalil successfully executes the Siege of Acre.
- May–July. Tyre, Sidon, Beirut surrender to Mamluks.
- 18 June. Alfonso III of Aragon dies and is succeeded by his brother James II of Aragon.
- 15 July. Rudolf I of Germany dies, and is succeeded by his son Albert I.
- 30 July. Mamluks occupy Haifa.
- 3–14 August. Templar castles Tortosa and Château Pèlerin evacuated, but retain their presence on the island fortress of Ruad.
- 6 August. Genoese-Sevillian fleet led by Benedetto Zaccaria wins a victory over Marinid fleet at Alcácer Seguir.
- August. Nicholas IV issues encyclical Dirum amaritudinem calicem for the recovery of the Holy Land.
- (Date unknown). Fidentius of Padua delivers Liber recuperations Terre Sancte to Nicholas IV.

1292

- 4 April. Nicholas IV dies, is succeeded by Celestine V who resigns after five months following the 1292–1294 papal election.
- Before 20 April. Jacques de Molay becomes 23rd and last Grand Master of the Knights Templar.
- (Date unknown). Sancho IV takes the Marinid city of Tarifa in the first engagement of the Battle of the Strait, and Guzmán el Bueno appointed governor.

1293

- December. Al-Nasir Muhammad begins his first reign as Mamluk sultan following the assassination of his brother Khalil.
- (Date unknown). Viborg Castle established in Finland as part of the Third Swedish Crusade led by Torkel Knutsson.

1294

- 18 February. Kublai Khan dies.
- 22 May. Venetian fleet destroyed by Genoans eastern off the port of Laiazzo in Cilician Armenia.
- 24 December. Boniface VIII elected pope.

1295

- 22 July. War of Curzola between the Republic of Venice and the Republic of Genoa begins.
- 4 October. Ghazan assumes power of the Mongol Ilkhanate, converts to Islam.
- Late. Kingdom of Castile defeated by the forces of Muhammad II of Granada at the Battle of Iznalloz.

1296

- 25 March. Frederick III of Sicily crowned and immediately excommunicated.
- 3 April. Guillaume de Villaret becomes Grand Master of the Knights Hospitaller.

1297

- (Date unknown). Boniface VIII organizes crusades against Frederick III of Sicily and the Colonna family.

1298

- 1 June. Forces of the Livonian Order are decisively defeated by the residents of Riga, allied with the Grand Duchy of Lithuania under Vytenis at the Battle of Turaida.
- 28 June. Livonians and the Teutonic Order defeat Riga and Lithuania near Neuermühlen, capturing Riga.
- 8 September. The Battle of Curzola fought between the navies of Venice and Genoa, a resounding defeat for the Venetians.
- October. Colonna family stronghold of Palestrina captured and destroyed by pontifical troops under Landolfo Colonna.

1299

- 16 January. Al-Nasir Muhammad begins his second reign as Mamluk sultan after the assassination of the usurper Hosam ad-Din Lajin.
- Early. Ghazan proposes a joint crusade Henry II of Cyprus and the three military orders. No action is taken by the West.
- Early. The Mongols under Ghazan invade Syria, capturing the city of Aleppo. Ghazan is joined by his vassal Hethum II of Armenia and his forces.
- 4 July. Aragonese-Angevin fleet led by Roger of Lauria defeats a Sicilian fleet at the Battle of Cape Orlando.
- 1 December. The Battle of Falconaria, part of the War of the Sicilian Vespers, fought between the forces of Frederick II of Sicily and Philip I of Taranto. It was a victory for Frederick and a disaster for Philip, who was captured.
- 22–23 December. The Mongols defeat the Mamluks at the Battle of Wadi al-Khaznadar.
- December. The Mongols invade Syria under General Mulay, chasing the Mamluks to Gaza.
- (Date unknown). Treaty ending the War of Curzola signed.

== 14th century ==
=== 1300 ===
- 6 January. After a short siege, the Mongols occupy the Citadel of Damascus.
- Feb. Boniface VIII announces first Jubilee Year in Rome, promotes a crusade.
- May. Mongols withdraw across the Euphrates. Mamluks then return to Syria from Egypt.
- 20 September. Italian diplomat Isol the Pisan appointed by Boniface VIII to be the laison between the Crusader states and the Mongol Empire.
- 28 October. After learning of an impending Mongol invasion of Syria, al-Nasir Muhammad leads an army to confront the invaders.
- 30 December. Ghazan invades Syria, turning back less than five weeks later due to cold weather that kills almost all of his cavalry's 12,000 horses.
- (Date unknown). Swedes under Tyrgils Knutsson lead an attack against the Novgorodians and establish an outpost at Landskrona.
- (Date approximate). Via ad Terram Sanctam, an anonymous Old French treatise on the recovery of the Holy Land written.

1301

- November. The island of Ruad, the staging area for incursions into Syria, granted to Templars under Marshall Barthélemy de Quincy.

1302

- 8 April. Muhammad III of Granada becomes ruler of the Emirate of Granada after the death of his father Muhammad II.
- 27 July. Ottomans defeat Byzantines at the Battle of Bapheus, beginning the Byzantine-Ottoman Wars.
- 31 August. Peace of Caltabellotta signed, ending the War of the Sicilian Vespers.
- 26 September. The Fall of Ruad to the Mamluks ends the presence of the Crusaders in the mainland of the Levant.
- (Date unknown). Mercenaries form the Catalan Company under Roger de Flor to support Byzantine Empire fight the Anatolian beyliks.

1303

- 20–22 April. Mamluks defeat the Mongols and Armenians at the Battle of Marj al-Saffar bringing an end to the Mongol invasions of the Levant.
- 22 October. Benedict XI elected pope.
- October. Catalan Company defeats the Ottomans at the Battle of the Cyzicus.
- (Date unknown). Hethum II of Armenia abdicates in favor of his nephew Leo III of Armenia.
- (Date unknown). Byzantines defeated by the Ottomans at the Battle of Dinboz.

1304

- 11 May. Ghazan dies and is succeeded by his brother Öljaitü as Mongol Ilkhan, fending off attacks by Alafrang, son of Gaykhatu.
- 7 July. Benedict XI dies.
- 24 October. Mesut of Menteshe captures the port town of Ephesus from the Byzantines.
- December. Catalan Company relocates to Gallipoli.
- (Date unknown). Benedetto I Zaccaria establishes the Lordship of Chios independent of the Byzantine Empire. Chios returns to the empire in 1346.
- (Date unknown). Ottomans occupy Nicaea.
- (Date unknown). Bulgaria defeats Byzantium at the Battle of Skafida.

1305

- 30 April. Michael IX Palaiologos has Roger de Flor assassinated in Adrianople along with 300 horsemen and some 1,000 foot soldiers who accompanied him.
- 5 June. Clement V elected pope.
- 10 July. Catalan Company defeats the Byzantines at the Battle of Apros beginning what was known as the Catalan Vengeance.
- (Date unknown). Foulques de Villaret becomes 25th Grand Master of the Hospitallers.
- (Date unknown). Clement V proposes to Foulques and Jacques de Molay that their Orders be merged.
- (Date unknown). Majorcan Christian apologist Ramon Lull proposes Oriental languages be taught in the West, presents Liber de Fine to James II of Aragon proposing new crusades against the Muslims.

1306

- 26 April. Amalric of Tyre overthrows Henry II in Jerusalem, assumes role of governor of Jerusalem.
- 5 May. Philip I of Taranto granted the Principality of Achaea by his father Charles II of Anjou.
- 27 May. Hospitaller Grand Master Foulques de Villaret enters into a contract with the Genoese Vignolo de' Vignoli for the joint conquest of Rhodes.
- 13 June. Hospitaller conquest of Rhodes begins.
- (Date unknown). French author Pierre Dubois writes De recuperatione Terre Sancte, a Treatise on the Recovery of the Holy Land.
- (Date unknown). Clement V orders a crusade against Fra Dolcino.

1307

- January. First version of Liber Secretorum Fidelium Crucis, a manual for retaking the Holy Land by Italian geographer Marino Sanuto Torcello, is presented to Clement V.
- 23 March. Fra Dolcino captured at Val Sesia and tried for heresy, and burned at the stake on 1 June.
- 14 April. Persian historian Rashid al-Din Hamadani completes his work Jami' al-tawarikh.
- 7 July. Edward II of England succeeds his father Edward I.
- 5 September. Clement V issued an act proclaiming the Hospitallers' ownership of Rhodes.
- 14 September. Philip IV orders the arrest of the Knights Templar throughout France, implemented on 13 October.
- 22 November. Clement V issues the papal decree Pastoralis praeeminentiae ordering Templars to be arrested throughout Europe.
- 17 November. Armenian group led by Leo III and Hethum II murdered by the Mongol Bilarghu. Hethum's brother Oshin of Armenia becomes king and avenges their death.
- (Date unknown). Mongols annex Seljuk Sultanate of Rûm, bringing the dynasty to its end.
- (Date unknown) Hayton of Corycus writes La Flor des estoires de la terre d'Orient (Flower of the Histories of the East) concerning the Muslim conquests and Mongol invasion.

1308

- 1 May. Albert I of Germany assassinated, Henry of Luxembourg crowned king of Germany (later to become Holy Roman Emperor as Henry VII).
- 12 August. Clement V issue the bull Faciens misericordiam to convene a council in 1310 to investigate the Templars and discuss a new crusade.
- 15 August. Hospitaller conquest of Rhodes completed with the capture of the city of Rhodes; headquarters relocated from Cyprus.
- 5 October. Walter V of Brienne assumes control of the Duchy of Athens.
- 13 November. Teutonic Knights takeover Gdańsk, beginning a long-running conflict between the State of the Teutonic Order and the Kingdom of Poland.
- 27 November. Henry of Luxembourg elected Holy Roman Emperor, confirmed by Clement V in July 1309 and crowned at Candlemas 1312.
- 19 December. Castile and Aragon sign the Treaty of Alcalá de Henares, pledging to help each other to achieve a total conquest of Granada and split its territories between them.
- (Date unknown). Mongols attempt to occupy Syria, getting as far as Jerusalem.
- (Date unknown). George Pachymeres writes De Michaele et Andronico Palæologis an account the loss of Constantinople in 1204, its recovery in 1261 by Michael VIII Palaiologos, and through 1308.

1309

- March. Avignon Papacy begins.
- 29 April. Clement V issues the papal bull Prioribus decanis allowing Ferdinand IV of Castile to finance the war against Granada.
- 5 May. Robert the Wise succeeds his father Charles II in Naples.
- Spring/summer. Crusade of the Poor begun, ends without reaching the Holy Land.
- 18 July. Siege of Almeria launched by James II of Aragon against Granada fails.
- 27 July. The first Siege of Algeciras launched by Ferdinand IV against Nasr of Granada. Castile is defeated January 1310.
- 15 August. The first Siege of Gibraltar is launched, resulting in a Castilian victory.
- 13 September. Treaty of Soldin provides legal basis for the Teuton occupation of Gdańsk.
- (Date unknown). Jean de Joinville publishes Life of Saint Louis, his definitive biography of Louis IX of France and a history of the Seventh Crusade.
- (Date unknown). Ramon Lull writes Liber de acquisitione terrae sanctae proposing land-based crusade via Constantinople.
- (Date unknown). Teutonic Knights move their headquarters from Venice to Malbork Castle in Marienburg.

=== 1310 ===
- 5 March. Al-Nasir Muhammad begins his third reign as sultan after the ouster of Baibars II who is executed on 15 April.
- May. Fifty four Templars burned at the stake.
- 5 June. Amalric of Tyre murdered.
- 26 August. Henry II restored as King of Jerusalem.
- 23 November. Abu Sa'id Uthman II becomes sultan of Morocco upon the death of his nephew Abu al-Rabi Sulayman.

1311

- 12 February. Baldwin of Luxembourg crushes the Guelph troops led by Guido della Torre at the Milan Uprising.
- 15 March. Catalan Company defeats the Athenians at the Battle of Halmyros.
- 7 April. Teutonic Knights defeat Lithuania at the Battle of Wopławki.
- 16 October. Council of Vienne convened to consider the fate of the Templars.

1312

- 22 March. Clement V issues the bull Vox in excelso to suppress the Templars.
- 29 June. Henry VII becomes Holy Roman Emperor, ending the Great Interregnum.
- (Date unknown). Mesut of Menteshe defeated in his attempt to recapture Rhodes at the Battle of Amorgos.
- (Date unknown). Öljaitü unsuccessfully attacks Mamluks at Rahbat.
- (Date unknown). Achaea disputed between Louis of Burgundy, titular King of Thessalonica, and Ferdinand of Majorca.
- (Date unknown). Last Mongol invasion of Syria is repulsed.

1313

- Pentecost. Philip IV and his sons take the cross in Paris for a crusade to depart in the spring of 1319.
- (Date unknown). Second version of Liber Secretorum Fidelium Crucis calls for economic warfare and provides a history of the Holy Land.

1314

- 11 March. Templars Jacques de Molay, Geoffroi de Charney and Hugues de Peraud burned at the stake.
- 20 April. Clement V dies, leading to the 1314–1316 papal conclave.
- 29 November. Louis X of France succeeds his father Philip IV at his death.

1315

- 29 June. Ramon Lull stoned to death on a missionary journey to Algeria.
- 29 August. Ghibelline army of Pisa commanded by Uguccione della Faggiuola defeats the Guelph armies of the Florentines and their allies at the Battle of Montecatini.
- (Date unknown). Great famine of 1315–1317 devastates Europe.

1316

- 22 February. Ferdinand of Majorca, claimant to the Principality of Achaea, defeats forces of Matilda of Hainaut at the Battle of Picotin.
- 5 June. Louis X of France dies.
- 5 July. Ferdinand of Majorca killed at the Battle of Manolada, John of Gravina assumes control of Achaea.
- 7 August. John XXII becomes pope.
- 20 November. Philip V of France crowned.
- 16 December. Öljaitü dies and his son Abu Sa'id becomes the 9th Ilkhan the next year.
- (Date unknown). Andronicus Asen becomes epitropos of Morea.
- (Date unknown). Ismail I of Granada, now Nasrid ruler, is unsuccessful in the second Siege of Gibraltar.
- (Date unknown, 1316 or 1317). Guillaume Adam, a papal missionary to Persia, writes De modo sarracenos extirpandi urging a new crusade.

1317

- 10 June. Order of Montesa, remnants of the Templars in Aragon and Valencia, approved to defend against the Moors and pirates.
- 5 July. Abu Sa'id becomes Ilkhan of the Mongols.
- 1 September. Foulques de Villaret dies, is succeeded by Hélion de Villeneuve two years later.

1318

- 13 July. Rashid al-Din Hamadani is convicted of the 1316 murder of Öljaitü and is executed.

1319

- 14 March. Denis of Portugal revives the Templars of Tomar as the Military Order of Christ and is recognized by John XXII in the papal bull Ad ea ex quibus.
- 25 June. Castile decisively defeated by Ismail I of Granada at the Battle of Sierra Elvira (Vega of Granada).
- 23 July. Albert of Schwarzburg, Grand Preceptor of the Hospitallers, defeats Turkish raiders at the Battle of Chios.

=== 1320 ===
- June. Peasants in Normandy begin Shepherds' Crusade to expel assist the Reconquista, and is crushed by royal forces.
- 9 September. Andronicus Asen defeats forces of Arcadia in the Battle of Saint George.
- (Date unknown). Menteshe launches the Battle of Rhodes, an unsuccessful attempt to conquer the island from the Hospitallers.

1321

- 19 April. First Byzantine civil war begins, pitting Andronikos II Palaiologos against his grandson Andronikos III Palaiologos over control of the empire, lasting until 1328, when Andronikos III becomes emperor.
- 21 June. Leper's plot, a conspiracy theory that lepers and Muslims were conspiring to poison water in France, results in lepers and Jews being burned at the stake.
- (Date unknown). Anti-Ghibelline crusade against Matteo I Visconti preached.
- (Date unknown). Final version of Liber Secretorum Fidelium Crucis presented to John XXII at Avignon.

1322

- 3 January. Charles IV of France crowned.
- (Date unknown). Treaty of Aleppo signed, ending the Mongol invasions of the Levant.

1323

- (Date unknown). Orkhan succeeds his father Osman I as sultan of the Ottoman Empire.

1324

- After 15 April. Hugh IV of Cyprus becomes King of Jerusalem upon the death of Henry II.
- 6 July. Werner von Orseln becomes Grand Master of the Teutonic Knights.

1325

- 7 January. Afonso IV of Portugal becomes king upon the death of his father Denis I.
- 8 July. Ismail I of Granada is murdered and is succeeded by his son Muhammad IV of Granada.
- November. Modena defeats Bologna at the Battle of Zappolino, part of the War of the Oaken Bucket.
- (Date unknown). Anti-Ghibelline crusade preached against Aldobrandino II d'Este and Obizzo III d'Este in Ferrara.

1326

- 10 February. Polish–Teutonic War begins with the 8-week Raid on Brandenburg by Polish-Lithuanian forces against Louis IV the Bavarian, protector of the Teutons, leaving the area devastated.
- 6 April. Ottomans capture Byzantine city in the Siege of Bursa.

1327

- 7 January. Parliament of 1327 convenes to consider deposing Edward II.
- 25 January. Edward III of England becomes king after the forced abdication of his father.

1328

- 1 April. Philip VI of France crowned.
- 24 May. Andronikos II Palaiologos abdicates and is succeeded by Andronicus III Palaeologus as Byzantine emperor, ending the first Byzantine civil war.
- (Date unknown). Siege of Nicaea begins, with Orkhan attacking the Byzantine city, under blockage since 1301.

1329

- 1 February. Siege of Medvėgalis by the Teutonic Knights and John of Bohemia results in the capture of a Lithuanian fortress in Samogitia.
- 10–11 June. Andronikos III tries and fails to break the siege at Nicaea by launching the Battle of Pelekanon.

=== 1330 ===
- 2 March. Siege of Nicaea ends with an Ottoman victory, their first conquest of a major Byzantine city.
- June. John XXII calls for an Anti-Catalan Crusade.
- August. Alfonso XI of Castile defeats Muhammed IV of Granada at the Battle of Teba.
- August. James Douglas killed at Teba while carrying the heart of Robert the Bruce to the Holy Land.
- 9–12 November. Forces of Basarab I of Wallachia defeat the Kingdom of Hungary at the Battle of Posada.
- 18 November. Grand Master Werner von Orseln dies after an assassination attempt.
- (Date unknown). Ramon Muntaner, a Catalan mercenary, publishes Crònica, which includes his adventures as a commander in the Catalan Company. The longest of the four Catalan Grand Chronicles.

1331

- 17 February. Lothar of Brunswick elected Grand Master of the Teutonic Knights.
- 27 September. Teutons defeated by Poland at the Battle of Płowce.
- 26 December. Robert of Taranto succeeds his father Philip I upon his death, assumes suzerainty of Achaea.
- (Date unknown). Philip VI begins planning his crusade to the Holy Land.

1332

- July. Directorium ad passagium faciendum proposing the conquest of the Holy Land submitted to Philip VI.
- (Date unknown). Holy League formed by Venice, Hospitallers, Cyprus and Byzantium to combat Turkish pirates from Aydin.

1333

- February–June. Muhammed IV successfully captures Gibraltar from the Castilians after the third Siege of Gibraltar.
- 26 June – 24 August. The fourth Siege of Gibraltar, a counterattack by Castile, is unsuccessful.
- (Date unknown). Ottomans begin the Siege of Nicomedia.
- (Date unknown). Marino Sanuto Torcello writes Istoria del regno di Romania, an account of the last days of the Latin Empire and the reconquest of Constantinople.

1334

- Autumn. Pietro Zeno defeats the Beylik of Karasi at the Battle of Adramyttion.
- 20 December. Benedict XII elected pope.

1335

- (Date unknown). Hospitallers encourage emigration to Rhodes, increasing population.

1336

- 13 March. Crusade of Philip VI cancelled.

1337

- (Date unknown). Siege of Nicomedia begun in 1333 ends with an Ottoman victory.

1339

- 28 October. Forces of Alfonso XI of Castile defeat those of Marinid sultan Abu al-Hasan 'Ali at the Battle of Vega de Pagana. The conflict is extended to 1340 at Rio Salado near Tarifa.

=== 1340 ===
- 30 October. Afonso IV of Portugal and Alfonso XI of Castile defeat Abu al-Hasan 'Ali and Yusuf I of Granada at the Battle of Rio Salado. The essentially ending the ability of the Marinids to conduct operations in Iberia.
- (Date unknown). Benedict XII authorizes the inconclusive Bohemian Crusade against heretics.
- (Date unknown). Chronicle of the Morea, written for Catherine of Valois-Courtenay, published.

1341

- 7 June. Mamluk sultan al-Nasir Muhammad dies and is succeeded by his sons and later sultans of the Bahri Dynasty that will last until 1382.
- 15 June. John V Palaiologos succeeds Andronicus III Palaeologus as Byzantine emperor, triggering the second Byzantine civil war.

1342

- 7 May. The Archbishop of Rouen elected pope, taking the name Clement VI.
- 3 August. Alfonso XI of Castile begins the second Siege of Algeciras to capture the capital and the main port of the European territory of the Marinid Empire.
- 31 August. Holy League of 1342 established to fight the Aydinids at Smyrna.
- (Date unknown). Aragon routs the Marinid fleet at the Battle of Estepona.

1343

- 8 July. Polish-Teutonic War concluded with the Treaty of Kalisz signed by the principals Casimir III the Great and Ludolf König von Wattzau.
- 30 November. Papal bull Insurgentibus contra fidem issued by Clement VI, proclaiming the first of the Smyrniote Crusades against Aydinids under Umur Bey.

1344

- 25 March. Algeciras surrenders to Alfonso XI. Only Gibraltar remained in Muslim hand.
- 13 May. Christians defeat large flotilla of Turkish raiders at the Battle of Pallene.
- 28 October. Assault on Smyrna ends the first Smyrniote Crusades.

1345

- May. Humbert II Viennois launches the Second Smyrniote Crusade.

1346

- (Date unknown). Mongols under Jani Beg lift the Siege of Caffa due to the Black Death.
- (Date unknown). Assizes of Romania collected.

1347

- 8 February. Second Byzantine civil war resolved with John VI Kantakouzenos and John V co-emperors.
- Late April. Hospitaller fleet sink large Turkish pirate fleet at the Battle of Imbros.

1348

- (Date unknown). Magnus IV of Sweden leads the Crusade against Novgorod, capturing the fortress of Orekhov. Magnus withdraws in 1351.
- (Date unknown). Citadel of Smyrna falls after the death of Umar Bey.

1349

- 24 August. Alfonso XI of Castile attempts to take Gibraltar with the fifth Siege of Gibraltar.
- (Date unknown). Despotate of the Morea established under Manuel Kantakouzenos, son of John VI Kantakouzenos.

=== 1350 ===
- 26 March. Alfonso XI of Castile dies of bubonic plague, leading to the Castilian Civil War the next year.
- 27 March. Latest attempt by Castile to retake Gibraltar fails.
- 22 August. John II of France becomes king upon the death of his father Philip VI.

1351

- September. Smyrniote Crusades ends with the city in Christian hands and will remain so for 60 years.

1352

- Fall. Third Byzantine civil war begins, lasts until 1357 leaving Byzantium in ruins.
- October. Ottomans defeat the Serbs and Bulgarians at the Battle of Demotika.
- 18 December. Innocent VI elected pope.

1353

- 30 June. Innocent VI sends Gil de Albornoz as papal legate into Italy at the head of a small mercenary army with a view to the restoration of the papal authority in the states of the Church.
- 11 September. Claude de la Sengle named Grand Master of the Order of Malta.

1354

- 2 March. Strong earthquake strikes the Gallipoli Peninsula and within a month, the Ottomans under Süleyman Pasha besiege and cause the Fall of Gallipoli.
- 10 March. Gil de Albornoz defeats Giovanni de Vico at the Battle of Orvieto.
- 10 December. John V Palaiologos retakes Constantinople and becomes sole emperor of Byzantium.
- (Date unknown). Innocent VI threatens to remove the Hospitallers from Rhodes if they don't take a more active role in fighting the Muslims.

1355

- 4 April. Charles IV of Luxembourg is crowned Holy Roman Emperor.
- (Date unknown). Ottomans defeat Bulgaria at the Battle of Ihtiman.

1357

- 28 May. Peter I of Portugal becomes king after the death of his father Alfonso IV.

1358

- 24 November. Hugh IV abdicates and is succeeded by his son Peter I of Cyprus.

1359

- 4 July. Crusade against Francesco Ordelaffi – Francesco II Ordelaffi surrenders to the papal commander Gil de Albornoz.
- 23 August. Ismail II of Granada overthrows his uncle Muhammed V.
- (Date unknown) Nicephorus Gregoras publishes his 37-volume Rhomaike Historia, covering Byzantine history in the years 1204–1359.

=== 1360 ===
- 5 April. Peter I of Cyprus crowned King of Jerusalem.

1361

- 24 August. Cypriots occupy Antalya until 1373.
- 21 December. Castile defeats Granada at the Battle of Linuesa.
- (Date unknown). Ottomans capture Demotika and Andrianople.

1362

- January. Castilians routed by the forces of Muhammed VI of Granada at the Battle of Guadix.
- March. Murad I becomes Ottoman sultan.
- 13 April. Muhammad VI flees Granada, is murdered by the orders of Peter of Castile two weeks later.
- 22 September. Urban V elected pope.
- October. Peter I of Cyprus announces intention to conduct a crusade to the Holy Land and travels to Europe to promote the expedition.

1363

- 31 March. Urban V proclaims a crusade and grants the signum crucis to Peter I and John II of France, to start not later than 1 March 1365.
- The pope urges Louis I of Hungary to crusade against the Turks.

1364

- 19 January. Amadeus VI of Savoy takes the cross after founding the chivalric Order of the Collar.
- 8 April. Charles V of France becomes king after the death of his father John II.

1365

- 12 April. Urban V issues passagium generale for Peter's crusade.
- 2 June. Louis I of Hungary captures Vidin, begins the Hungarian occupation of Vidin.
- 9–12 October. Alexandrian Crusade launched and the city captured in one day. Crusade withdraws to Cyprus on 12 October.

1366

- 13 March. Henry of Trastámara deposes his half-brother Pedro of Castile to become king.
- 21 June. Amadeus VI launches the Savoyard Crusade against Thrace and Bulgaria.
- 27 August. Amadeus VI captures Gallipoli.

1367

- 3 April. Peter of Castile is victorious at Battle of Nájera over Henry of Trastámara and Edward the Black Prince.
- 29 July. Amadeus VI returns to Venice, ending the Savoyard Crusade.

1368

- (Date unknown). Philippe de Mézières writes Nova religio passionis, a prospectus for a new religious order dedicated to crusading. Enlarged in 1385 and 1396.

1369

- 17 January. Peter II of Cyprus becomes King of Jerusalem upon the assassination of his father Peter I.
- 14 March. Henry of Trastámara defeats his half-brother Peter of Castile at the Battle of Montiel, ending the Castilian Civil War.
- 28 July. Granada launches the third Siege of Algeciras, retaking the city on 30 July.

=== 1370 ===
- 18 February. Teutonic Knights defeat Lithuania at the Battle of Rudau.
- 9 April. Timur establishes the Timurid Empire after his success at the Siege of Balkh.
- 30 December. Gregory XI elected pope.

1371

- 26 September. Serbia begins expedition to expel the Turks from Adrianople, led by brothers Vukašin and Uglješa. They meet the Ottomans at Çirmen, near the Bulgarian border, and are decimated at the Battle of Maritsa.
- (Date unknown). John V Palaiologos recognized the suzerainty of the Ottoman sultan Murad I.
- (Date unknown). Guillaume de Machaut publishes his La Prise d'Alexandre, a poetic chronicle of the chivalric deeds of Peter I of Cyprus and the Alexandria Crusade.

1373

- 12 May. Genoese invade Cyprus at the invitation of Eleanor of Aragon, ostensibly to avenge the murder of her husband Peter I. Peter II and Eleanor are imprisoned and the murderers are killed.
- (Date unknown). Andronikos IV Palaiologos joins Savcı Bey in rebellion against their fathers, beginning the fourth Byzantine civil war.
- (Date unknown). Bulgarian emperor Ivan Shishman agrees to become an Ottoman vassal.

1374

- March. Genoese take James I of Cyprus hostage to force the Cypriots to agree to their terms.
- 21 April. Cyprus agrees to Genoa's terms and the Genoese depart, leaving the island devastated.

1375

- (Date unknown). Mamluks capture Sis and take Leo V of Armenia prisoner, ending Cilician Armenia as an independent kingdom.
- (Date unknown, approximate). Principality of Achaea defeats Despotate of the Morea at the Battle of Gardiki.

1376

- 8 June. Edward the Black Prince, heir to the throne of England, dies.
- 12 August. Andronikos IV overthrows his father John V Palaiologos as emperor.
- (Date unknown). Gregory XI plans a crusade due to pleas from Catherine of Siena.

1377

- 21 June. Edward III of England dies.
- 16 July. Richard II of England crowned.
- (Date unknown). Achaea controlled of the Hospitallers under Grand Master Juan Fernández de Heredia, who leased the principality from Joanna of Naples and Otto of Brunswick. The lease is abandoned in 1381.

1378

- 8 April. Urban VI elected pope, preaches crusade against Joanna of Naples.
- April–August. Gjin Bua Shpata defeats the Hospitallers at Epirus, taking Juan Fernández de Heredia prisoner.
- 30 May. War of Chioggia, the last major conflict of the Venetian–Genoese Wars, begins.
- 20 September. Thirteen cardinals reject Urban VI as pope, and elect Clement VII as antipope, beginning the Great Schism within the Catholic Church.
- (Date unknown). Uthman Beg establishes the Aq Qoyunlu, or the White Sheep Turkomans, a tribal confederation in Diyar Bakir.

1379

- 1 July. John V Palaiologos restored as Byzantine emperor, ending the fourth Byzantine civil war.

=== 1380 ===
- 31 May. Jogaila signs the Treaty of Dovydiškės with the Teutonic Knights, sparking a civil war with his uncle Kęstutis.
- 24 June. The naval Battle of Chiogga resulted in the defeat of the Genoese by the Venetians.
- 8 September. Russian forces under Grand Prince Dmitry Donskoy stop an invasion by the Blue Horde at the Battle of Kulikovo.
- 16 September. Charles V is succeeded by his twelve-year-old son Charles VI of France.

1381

- 8 August. Treaty of Turin is signed, ending the War of Chioggia.
- August. First Lithuanian Civil War begins.

1382

- 12 May. Charles III of Naples becomes king of Jerusalem after having his cousin Joanna I of Naples strangled in jail.
- 13 October. Peter II of Cyprus dies and is succeeded by his son James I of Cyprus, still imprisoned in Genoa.
- 27 November. Al-Salih Hajji, the last ruler of the Bahri dynasty, is overthrown by Barquq, ushering in the Burji dynasty.
- (Date unknown) Antipope Clement VII grants crusade indulgences to Louis I of Anjou to dethrone Charles III.

1383

- 19 February. Cyprus and Genoa reach a peace treaty.
- 2 April. Portuguese interregnum begins.
- 8 June. English and Ghent forces fail at the Siege of Ypres, the last military action in Despenser's Crusade.
- 7 July. James of Baux, the last Latin emperor of Constantinople, dies.
- November. Burji dynasty established in Mamluk Egypt under Sayf ad-Din Barquq.
- December. Despenser's Crusade begins, led by Henry le Despenser in the revolt of Ghent against France.
- (Date unknown). Despite being an Ottoman vassal, Lala Shahin Pasha attacks Bulgaria at the Siege of Sofia.

1384

- 16 November. Ten-year-old Jadwiga of Poland is crowned in Kraków following the death of her father Louis I of Hungary in 1382.
- (Date unknown). Antipope Clement VII proclaims a crusade in support of the invasion of John I of Castile as he invades Portugal.

1385

- 23 April. James I of Cyprus returns home to an enthusiastic welcome by the populace.
- 18 September. Ottomans defeat Serbian forces under Balša II and Ivaniš Mrnjavčević at the Battle of Savra.
- (Date unknown). Lazar of Serbia defeated an Ottoman force at the Battle of Pločnik in eastern Serbia.

1386

- 4 March. Jogaila marries Jadwiga and is crowned Władysław II Jagiełło beginning the Jagiellonian dynasty of Poland.
- (Date unknown). Timurid invasions of Georgia begin.

1387

- Spring. John of Gaunt leads a crusade against Henry of Trastámara to claim the throne of Castile by right of his wife Constance of Castile.

1388

- 26 August. Bosnian forces led by Vlatko Vuković defeat the Ottomans under Lala Şahin Pasha at the Battle of Bileća.

1389

- 15 June. At the Battle of Kosovo, armies under Lazar of Serbia and Murad I meet. Both armies are destroyed and their commanders killed.
- 16 June. Bayezid I becomes Ottoman sultan after the death of his father Murad I at Kosovo.
- 2 November. Boniface IX elected pope.
- (Date unknown). Second Lithuanian Civil War begins.
- (Date unknown). Philippe de Mézières writes Songe du Vieil Pèlerin written, advocating peace between England and France as the path towards a successful crusade.

=== 1390 ===
- 19 January. The Treaty of Lyck between Vytautas and the Teutonic Knights signed.
- 14 April. John VII Palaiologos overthrows John V Palaiologos, becomes Byzantine Emperor for five months. John V restored on 17 September.
- 26 May. Treaty of Königsberg is signed between Samogitian nobles and the Teutonic Knights.
- 1 July. Louis II de Bourbon leads the Mahdia Crusade against Barbary pirates in Tunisia.
- (Date unknown). Bayezid I marries Olivera Despina, daughter of Lazar of Serbia.
- (Date unknown). Fall of Philadelphia (Alaşehir) marks the conquest of the last independent Greek settlement in western Asia Minor to the Ottomans.

1391

- 16 February. Manuel II Palaeologus becomes Byzantine emperor as a vassal to Bayezid.
- 6 June. Pogroms of 1391 against Jews in Spain begun.
- 18 July. Timur defeats Tokhtamysh of the Golden Horde at the Battle of the Kondurcha River.
- July. Bayezid's invasion of Anatolia stopped at the Battle of Kırkdilim.

1392

- 3 October. Muhammad VII of Granada succeeds Yusuf II as Nasrid sultan of Granada.
- December. Nasrids conduct a Raid on Murcia, threatening the truce with Castile.

1393

- 17 July. Ottomans capture Bulgarian capital city after the Siege of Tarnovo, reducing the empire to a few fortresses along the Danube.

1394

- 10 October. Wallachian force under Mircea the Elder, grandfather of Vlad Dracula, defeats the Ottomans at the first Battle of Rovine (Karanovasa).
- (Date unknown). Bayezid begins the Siege of Constantinople, lasting until 1402.

1395

- 15 April. Timur defeats Tokhtamysh at the Battle of the Terek River.
- 17 May. Bayezid's invasion of Wallachia is stopped at the second Battle of Rovine.
- 3 June. Bayezid beheads Ivan Shishman, accused of collaborating with the Wallachians during the first Battle of Rovine.

1396

- Spring/Summer. Sigismund of Luxembourg organizes the Crusade of Nicopolis to relieve the pressure on Constantinople.
- 25 September. Ottomans defeat the allied Western forces at the Battle of Nicopolis, causing the end of the Second Bulgarian Empire.

1398

- 12 October. Treaty of Salynas is signed by Vytautas and Konrad von Jungingen in an attempt to cede Samogitia to the Teutonic Knights.
- (Date unknown). Crusade of Tedelis between Martin of Aragon and the Kingdom of Tlemcen is inconclusive.

1399

- June. An-Nasir Faraj becomes Mamluk sultan after the death of his father Barquq.
- Summer. Bona Crusade initiated by Martin of Aragon against the Hafsid sultanate is inconclusive.
- 29 September. Richard II of England deposed and is succeeded by Henry IV of England, son of John of Gaunt.
- (Date unknown). Jean II Le Maingre forms the chivalric order Emprise de l'Escu vert à la Dame Blanche. He later leads a crusade to support the emperor during the Siege of Constantinople.

== 15th century ==
=== 1400 ===
- October–November. Timurids defeat the Mamluks at the Sack of Aleppo.
- (Date unknown). Siege of Damascus results in a Timudid victory over the Mamluks.

1402

- 20 July. Timurids defeat the Mamluks at the Battle of Ankara.
- 20 July. Bayezid I and Olivera Despina captured at Ankara, beginning Ottoman Interregnum.
- (Date unknown). Siege of Constantinople ends with the Byzantines remaining in control of the city.
- December. Timurids take the city from the Hospitallers at the Siege of Smyrna.

1405

- 14 February. Timur dies, Shah Rukh becomes ruler of Timurid Empire.

1415

- 21 August 1415. Portuguese conquest of Ceuta.

== Bibliography ==
- Amitai-Preiss, Reuven (1995). Mongols and Mamluks: The Mamluk-Îlkhânid War, 1260–1281. Cambridge University Press. ISBN 978-0-521-46226-6.
- Amitai-Preiss, Reuven (1999). The Mongol Empire and Its Legacy. Brill. ISBN 978-90-04-11048-9.
- Asbridge, Thomas (2012). The Crusades: The War for the Holy Land. Simon & Schuster. ISBN 978-1-84983-688-3.
- Atiya, Aziz Suryal (1934). The Crusade of Nicopolis. Methuen & Company, Limited. ISBN 978-0-404-15410-3.
- Atiya, Aziz Suryal (1938). The Crusade in the Later Middle Ages. Methuen. ISBN 978-0-527-03700-0.
- Atiya, Aziz Suryal (1975a). The Crusade in the Fourteenth Century (PDF). A History of the Crusades (Setton), Volume III.
- Atiya, Aziz Suryal (1975b). The Aftermath of the Crusades (PDF). A History of the Crusades (Setton), Volume III.
- Baldwin, Marshall W. (1985). Missions to the East in the Thirteenth and Fourteenth Centuries (PDF). A History of the Crusades (Setton), Volume V.
- Barber, Malcolm (2006). The Trial of the Templars. Cambridge University Press. ISBN 978-1-107-64576-9.
- Barker, John W. (1969). Manuel II Palaeologus (1391-1425): A Study in Late Byzantine Statesmanship. Rutgers University Press. ISBN 978-0-8135-0582-4.
- Bartusis, Mark C. (1997). The Late Byzantine Army Arms and Society 1204-1453. University of Pennsylvania Press. ISBN 978-0-8122-1620-2.
- Beazley, Raymond (1923). Prince Henry the Navigator. New York, G. P. Putnam's sons.
- Bernardini, Michele (2016). Tīmūr and the Frankish Powers (PDF). In Norman Housley (ed.). The Crusade in the Fifteenth Century.
- Bishko, Charles Julian (1975). The Spanish and Portuguese Reconquest, 1095-1492 (PDF). A History of the Crusades (Setton), Volume III.
- Bosworth, Clifford Edmund (2004). The New Islamic dynasties: A Chronological and Genealogical Manual. Edinburgh University Press. ISBN 978-0-7486-2137-8.
- Brackob, A.K. (2020). Mircea the Old Father of Wallachia, Grandfather of Dracula. Histria Books. ISBN 978-1-59211-073-5.
- Bryce, James (1892). The Holy Roman Empire. London, Macmillan and co.
- Buttigieg, Emanuel; Phillips, Simon (2016). Islands and Military Orders, c.1291-c.1798. Routledge. ISBN 978-1-317-11196-2.
- Cahen, Claude (1968). Pre-Ottoman Turkey. University of Michigan. ISBN 978-1-59740-027-5.ƒ1307
- Cahen, Claude (1969). The Mongols and the Near East (PDF). A History of the Crusades (Setton), Volume II.
- Çelik, Siren (2021). Manuel II Palaiologos 1350–1425 A Byzantine Emperor in a Time of Tumult. Cambridge University Press. ISBN 978-1-108-87403-8.
- Chasin, Martin (1989). The Crusade of Varna (PDF). A History of the Crusades (Setton), Volume VI.
- Chaytor, Henry John (1933). A History of Aragon and Catalonia. Methuen. ISBN 978-0-404-01479-7.
- Cox, Eugene L. (1967). The Green Count of Savoy, Amadeus VI and Transalpine Savoy in the Fourteenth Century. Princeton University Press. ISBN 978-0-691-05125-3.
- Creasy, Edward Shepherd (1878). History of the Ottoman Turks from the beginning of their empire to the present time. New York, H. Holt.
- Christiansen, Eric (1997). The Northern Crusades. Penguin Publishing Group. ISBN 978-0-14-026653-5.
- Delaville Le Roulx, Joseph (1904). Les Hospitaliers en Terre Sainte et à Chypre (1100–1310). E. Leroux, Paris.
- Demurger, Alain (2009). The Last Templar: The Tragedy of Jacques de Molay. Profile Books. ISBN 978-1-84668-224-7.
- Disney, A. R. (2009). A History of Portugal and the Portuguese Empire. Cambridge University Press. ISBN 978-0-511-81333-7.
- Dunbabin, Jean (1998). Charles I of Anjou: Power, Kingship and State-Making in Thirteenth-Century Europe. Longman. ISBN 978-1-78093-767-0.
- Dyer, Thomas Henry (1861). The history of modern Europe. London, J. Murray. ISBN 978-1-02-234462-4.
- Edbury, Peter W. (1991). The Kingdom of Cyprus and the Crusades, 1191–1374. Cambridge University Press. ISBN 978-0-521-26876-9.
- Fine, John V. A. (1994). The Late Medieval Balkans: A Critical Survey from the Late Twelfth Century to the Ottoman Conquest. University of Michigan Press. ISBN 9780472082605.
- Frale, Barbara (2011). The Templars: The Secret History Revealed. Arcade. ISBN 978-1-61145-019-4.
- France, John (2006). The Crusades and the Expansion of Catholic Christendom, 1000-1714. Routledge. ISBN 978-1-134-19618-0.
- Freely, John (2009). The Grand Turk Sultan Mehmet II Conqueror of Constantinople and Master of an Empire. Overlook. ISBN 978-1-59020-449-8.
- Frost, Robert (2015). The Oxford History of Poland-Lithuania. Oxford University Press. ISBN 978-0-19-174634-5.
- Galeotti, Mark (2019). Kulikova 1380: The Battle that Made Russia. Bloomsbury USA. ISBN 978-1-4728-3121-7.
- Geanakoplos, Deno John (1975a). Byzantium and the Crusades, 1261–1354 (PDF). A History of the Crusades (Setton), Volume III.
- Geanakoplos, Deno John (1975b). Byzantium and the Crusades, 1354–1453 (PDF). A History of the Crusades (Setton), Volume III.
- Georgiou, Constantinos (2018). Preaching the Crusades to the Eastern Mediterranean: Propaganda, Liturgy and Diplomacy. Routledge. ISBN 978-0-367-59252-3.
- Ghazarian, Jacob G. (2000). The Armenian Kingdom in Cilicia During the Crusades. Curzon. ISBN 978-0-7007-1418-6.
- Gibbon, Edward (1870). The Crusades. London: A. Murray and Son.
- Gifford, John (1792). The History of France. London, Printed for C. Lowndes and W. Locke.
- Grousset, René (1934). Histoire des croisades et du royaume franc de Jérusalem. Plon, Paris.
- Grousset, René (1935). L'Épopée des croisades. Paris: le Club français du livre.
- Grousset, René (1970). The Empire of the Steppes: A History of Central Asia. Translated by Naomi Walford. Rutgers University Press. ISBN 978-0-8135-1304-1.
- Harvey, Leonard Patrick (1992). Islamic Spain from 1250 to 1500. University of Chicago Press. ISBN 978-0-226-31962-9.
- Hazard, Harry W. (1975). Moslem North Africa, 1049–1394 (PDF). A History of the Crusades (Setton), Volume III.
- Hazlitt, William Carew (1900). The Venetian Republic. A. and C. Black, London.
- Heymann, Frederick Gotthold (1975). The Crusades against the Hussites (PDF). A History of the Crusades (Setton), Volume III.
- Hinterberger, Martin; Schabel, Chris (2011). Greeks, Latins, and Intellectual History 1204-1500 (PDF). Peeters.
- Housley, Norman (1982). The Italian Crusades: The Papal-Angevin Alliance and the Crusades against Christian Lay Powers, 1254–1343. Clarendon Press. ISBN 978-0-19-821925-5.
- Housley, Norman (1986). The Avignon Papacy and the Crusades, 1305-1378. Clarendon Press. ISBN 978-0-19-821957-6.
- Housley, Norman (1992). The Later Crusades, 1274-1580: From Lyons to Alcazar. Oxford University Press. ISBN 9780198221371.
- Housley, Norman (2004). Housley, Norman (ed.). Crusading in the Fifteenth Century: Message and Impact. Springer Link. doi:10.1057/9780230523357. ISBN 978-1-4039-0283-2.
- Housley, Norman (2016). The Crusade in the Fifteenth Century: Converging and Competing Cultures. Taylor & Francis Group. ISBN 978-1-315-61515-8.
- Howarth, Stephen (1982). Knights Templar. Marboro Books, New York. ISBN 978-0-00-216452-8.
- Huizinga, Johan (1924). The Waning of the Middle Ages. London: Edward Arnold & Co.
- Imber, Colin (2002). The Ottoman Empire. Palgrave Macmillan. ISBN 978-0-333-61386-3.
- İnalcık, Halil (1989). The Ottoman Turks and the Crusades, 1329–1451 (PDF). A History of the Crusades (Setton), Volume VI.
- Irwin, Robert (1986). The Middle East in the Middle Ages: The Early Mamluk Sultanate, 1250–1382. Southern Illinois University Press. ISBN 978-1-59740-048-0.
- Jackson, Peter (2005). The Mongols and the West: 1221–1410. Pearson Longman. ISBN 978-0-582-36896-5.
- Johnson, Edgar N. (1975). The German Crusade on the Baltic (PDF). A History of the Crusades (Setton), Volume III.
- Jučas, Mečislovas (2009). The Battle of Grünwald. National Museum. ISBN 978-609-95074-5-3.
- Kastritsis, Dimitris (2007). The Sons of Bayezid. Brill. ISBN 978-90-474-2247-1.
- Kazhdan, Alexander P. (2005). Oxford Dictionary of Byzantium. Oxford University Press. ISBN 978-0-19-504652-6.
- Kurkjian, Vahan M. (1958). History of Armenia. Armenian General Benevolent Union of America.
- Lane-Poole, Stanley (1901). History of Egypt in the Middle Ages. A History of Egypt; v. 6. Methuen, London. ISBN 978-0-7905-3204-2.
- Lardner, Dionysius (1833). History of Spain and Portugal. Philadelphia: Carey & Lea.
- Laiou, Angeliki E. (2002), "Political History: An Outline", in Laiou, Angeliki E. (ed.), The Economic History of Byzantium: From the Seventh through the Fifteenth Century, Dumbarton Oaks, ISBN 978-0-88402-332-6
- Leopold, Antony R. (2000). How to Recover the Holy Land: The Crusade Proposals of the Late Thirteenth and Early Fourteenth Centuries. Ashgate. ISBN 978-0-7546-0120-3.
- Lock, Peter (1995). The Franks in the Aegean 1204-1500. Routledge. ISBN 978-0-582-05139-3.
- Lock, Peter (2006). The Routledge Companion to the Crusades. Routledge. doi:10.4324/9780203389638. ISBN 978-0-415-39312-6.
- Luke, Harry (1975a). The Kingdom of Cyprus, 1291–1369 (PDF). A History of the Crusades (Setton), Volume III.
- Luke, Harry (1975b). The Kingdom of Cyprus, 1369–1489 (PDF). A History of the Crusades (Setton), Volume III.
- Luttrell, Anthony T. (1975). The Hospitallers at Rhodes, 1306–1421 (PDF). A History of the Crusades (Setton), Volume III.
- Luttrell, Anthony T. (1982). Latin Greece, the Hospitallers, and the Crusades, 1291-1440. University of Michigan. ISBN 978-0-86078-106-6.
- Lützow, Francis (1914). The Hussite Wars. London, J. M. Dent & sons.
- Mazor, Amir (2015). The Rise and Fall of a Muslim Regiment: The Mansuriyya in the First Mamluk Sultanate, 1279–1341. Vandenhoeck & Ruprecht Unipress. ISBN 978-3-8470-0424-0.
- Menache, Sophia (1998). Clement V. Cambridge University Press. ISBN 978-0-521-52198-7.
- Michaud, Joseph–François (1881). The history of the Crusades. Translated by William Robson. Published by George Routledge and Sons.
- Miller, William (1908). The Latins in the Levant: a history of Frankish Greece 1204-1566. New York: Dutton.
- Miller, William (1921). Essays on the Latin Orient. Cambridge University Press.
- Mixson, James (2022). The Crusade of 1456. University of Toronto Press. ISBN 978-1-4875-0576-9.
- Moore, Clement Clarke (1850). George Castriot, surnamed Scanderbeg, king of Albania. New York, D. Appleton & company.
- Muir, William (1896). The Mameluke or Slave dynasty of Egypt. London, Smith, Elder.
- Murray, Alan V. (2001). Crusade and Conversion on the Baltic Frontier 1150–1500. Ashgate. ISBN 978-0-7546-0325-2.
- Murray, Alan V. (2006). The Crusades—An Encyclopedia. ABC-CLIO. ISBN 978-1-57607-862-4.
- Murray, Alan V. (2009). The Clash of Cultures on the Medieval Baltic Frontier. Ashgate. ISBN 978-0-7546-6483-3.
- Mutafian, Claude; Otten-Froux, Catherine (1993). Le Royaume Arménien de Cilicie. University of Michigan. ISBN 978-2-271-05105-9.
- Nicol, Donald M. (1993). The Last Centuries of Byzantium, 1261–1453. Cambridge University Press. ISBN 978-0-521-43991-6.
- Nicolle, David (2005). Acre 1291: Bloody Sunset of the Crusader States. Bloomsbury USA. ISBN 978-1-84176-862-5.
- Northrup, Linda (1998). From Slave to Sultan: The Career of Al-Manṣūr Qalāwūn and the Consolidation of Mamluk Rule in Egypt and Syria (1279-1290). Franz Steiner Verlag. ISBN 978-3-515-06861-1.
- O'Callaghan, Joseph F. (2011). The Gibraltar Crusade: Castile and the Battle for the Strait. University of Pennsylvania Press. ISBN 978-0-8122-0463-6.
- O'Callaghan, Joseph F. (2014). The Last Crusade in the West: Castile and the Conquest of Granada. University of Pennsylvania Press. ISBN 978-0-8122-0935-8.
- O'Rourke, Michael (2010). Byzantium, from recovery to ruin, a detailed chronology: AD 1220-1331. Scribd, Canberra, Australia.
- Ostrogorsky, George (1969). History of the Byzantine State. ISBN 978-0-8135-0599-2.
- Phillips, Jenna Rebecca (2017). The Capetian Century, 1214-1314. Brepols. ISBN 978-2-503-56718-1.
- Phillips, J. R. S. (2010). Edward II. Yale University Press. ISBN 978-0-300-15657-7.
- Plum, Harry Grant (1906). The Teutonic order and its secularization. Iowa City, the University.
- Richard, Jean C. (1979). The Latin Kingdom of Jerusalem. Amsterdam, North Holland. ISBN 978-0-444-85262-5.
- Richard, Jean C. (1985). The Political and Ecclesiastical Organization of the Crusader States (PDF). A History of the Crusades (Setton), Volume V.
- Richard, Jean C. (1999). The Crusades, c. 1071 – c. 1291. Cambridge University Press. ISBN 978-0-521-62566-1.
- Riley-Smith, Jonathan (2001). The Oxford Illustrated History of The Crusades. Oxford University Press. ISBN 978-0-19-285428-5.
- Riley-Smith, Jonathan (2012). The Knights Hospitaller in the Levant, c. 1070 – 1309. Palgrave Macmillan. ISBN 978-0-230-29083-9.
- Robbert, Louise Buenger (1985). Venice and the Crusades (PDF). A History of the Crusades (Setton), Volume V.
- Rossi, Ettore (1975). The Hospitallers at Rhodes, 1421–1523 (PDF). A History of the Crusades (Setton), Volume III.
- Roux, Jean-Paul (1993). Histoire de l'Empire mongol. Fayard. ISBN 978-2-213-03164-4.
- Runciman, Steven (1954). A History of the Crusades, Volume Three: The Kingdom of Acre and the Later Crusades. Cambridge University Press. ISBN 978-0-521-34772-3.
- Runciman, Steven (1958). The Sicilian Vespers: A History of the Mediterranean World in the Later Thirteenth Century. Cambridge University Press. ISBN 978-1-107-60474-2.
- Runciman, Steven (1965). The Fall of Constantinople 1453. Cambridge University Press. ISBN 978-0-521-39832-9.
- Runciman, Steven (1969). The Crusader States, 1243–1291 (PDF). A History of the Crusades (Setton), Volume II.
- Runciman, Steven (2009). Lost Capital of Byzantium The History of Mistra and the Peloponnese. I. B. Tauris. ISBN 978-0-85771-810-5.
- Russell, Peter E. (2000). Prince Henry the Navigator A Life. Yale University Press. ISBN 978-0-300-08233-3.
- Sayer, Frederick (1865). The history of Gibraltar and of its political relation to events in Europe. London, Chapman and Hall.
- Schein, Sylvia (1991). Fideles Crucis: The Papacy, the West, and the Recovery of the Holy Land, 1274–1314. Clarendon Press. ISBN 978-0-19-822165-4.
- Setton, Kenneth M. (1969). A History of the Crusades. University of Wisconsin Press.
- Setton, Kenneth M. (1975a). The Catalans in Greece, 1311–1380 (PDF). A History of the Crusades (Setton), Volume III.
- Setton, Kenneth M. (1975b). The Catalans and Florentines in Greece, 1380–1462 (PDF). A History of the Crusades (Setton), Volume III.
- Setton, Kenneth M. (1976a). The Papacy and the Levant, 1204–1571, Volume I: The Thirteenth and Fourteenth centuries. American Philosophical Society. ISBN 978-0-87169-114-9.
- Setton, Kenneth M. (1976b). The Papacy and the Levant, 1204–1571, Volume II: The Fifteenth Century. American Philosophical Society. ISBN 978-0-87169-114-9.
- Setton, Kenneth M. (1989). The Ottoman Turks and the Crusades 1451-1522 (PDF). A History of the Crusades (Setton), Volume VI.
- Sinor, Denis (1975). The Mongols and Western Europe (PDF). A History of the Crusades (Setton), Volume III.
- Slack, Corliss K. (2013). Historical Dictionary of the Crusades. Scarecrow Press. ISBN 978-0-8108-7830-3.
- Stephens, Frederic G. (1870). A history of Gibraltar and its sieges. Provost.
- Sterns, Indrikis (1985). The Teutonic Knights in the Crusader States (PDF). A History of the Crusades (Setton), Volume V.
- Stewart, Angus Donal (2001). The Armenian Kingdom and the Mamluks. Brill. ISBN 978-90-04-12292-5.
- Stone, Daniel (2001). The Polish-Lithuanian State 1386-1795. University of Washington Press. ISBN 978-0-295-98093-5.
- Taaffe, John (1852). The history of the Holy, military, sovereign order of St. John of Jerusalem. Oxford University. ISBN 978-0-353-54751-3.
- Throop, Palmer A. (1940). Criticism of the Crusade: A Study of Public Opinion and Crusade Propaganda. Porcupine Press. ISBN 978-0-87991-618-3.
- Topping, Peter (1975a). The Morea, 1311–1364 (PDF). A History of the Crusades (Setton), Volume III.
- Topping, Peter (1975b). The Morea, 1364–1460 (PDF). A History of the Crusades (Setton), Volume III.
- Townsend, George Henry (1867). A Manual of Dates. London, Warne.
- Turnbull, Stephen (2005). Tannenberg 1410 Disaster for the Teutonic Knights. Praeger. ISBN 978-0-275-98860-9.
- Tyerman, Christopher J. (1985). "Philip VI and the Recovery of the Holy Land". The English Historical Review. 100 (394): 25–52. JSTOR 569926.
- Tyerman, Christopher (1996). England and the Crusades, 1095–1588. University of Chicago Press. ISBN 0-226-82012-2.
- Tyerman, Christopher (2006). God's War: A New History of the Crusades. Belknap Press. ISBN 978-0-674-02387-1.
- Urban, William L. (1975). The Baltic Crusade. Northern Illinois University Press. ISBN 978-0-87580-052-3.
- Urban, William L. (2003). The Teutonic Knights. Greenhill. ISBN 978-1-85367-535-5.
- Urban, William L. (2006). The Samogitian Crusade. Lithuanian Research and Studies Center. ISBN 978-0-929700-03-8.
- Venning, Timothy (2015). A Chronology of the Crusades. Taylor & Francis. ISBN 978-1-317-49643-4.
- Villari, Pasquale (1910). Mediaeval Italy from Charlemagne to Henry VII. London: T. Fisher Unwin.
- Waterson, James (2007). The Knights of Islam: The Wars of the Mamluks. London: Greenhill Books. ISBN 978-1-85367-734-2.
- Wolff, Robert Lee (1969). The Latin Empire of Constantinople, 1204–1312 (PDF). A History of the Crusades (Setton), Volume II.
- Woodhouse, F. C. (1879). Teutonic Knights. In The Military Religious Orders of the Middle Ages.
- Wyatt, Walter James (1876). The history of Prussia from the earliest times to the present day. London, Longmans, Green and Co.
- Ziyādaẗ, Muḥammad Muṣṭafā (1969). The Mamluk Sultans to 1293 (PDF). A History of the Crusades (Setton), Volume II.
- Ziyādaẗ, Muḥammad Muṣṭafā (1975). The Mamluk Sultans, 1291–1517 (PDF). A History of the Crusades (Setton), Volume III.
