= Battle of Amorgos (1312) =

Naval battle in 1312 between the Knights Hospitaller and the Turkish beylik of Menteshe

- Part of the Crusades
Date	1312
Location	Amorgos
Result	Hospitaller victory

Belligerents
Knights Hospitaller	Beylik of Menteshe

Strength
Unknown	23 ships

Casualties and losses
57 knights and 300 foot soldiers killed	23 ships burned, 800 soldiers killed

The Battle of Amorgos occurred in 1312 between the fleets of the Knights Hospitaller and of the Turkish beylik of Menteshe. The battle was a Hospitaller victory, but both sides suffered heavy losses.

== Background ==
Following their conquest of Rhodes, which they made their base of operations, the Knights Hospitaller quickly assumed military action in the waters of the Aegean Sea. Their targets were not only Turkish ships, but also a Genoese vessel carrying out trade with Mamluk Egypt in defiance of an embargo on such activities by the Pope, even though the Genoese had assisted the Hospitallers in their capture of Rhodes. When the Genoese sent an envoy to Rhodes to demand the ships' release in 1311, the Knights refused. In retaliation, the Genoese gave 50,000 gold florins to Mesud, Emir of Menteshe, to attack the Knights.

== Battle ==
Masud seized several Rhodian merchants in the mainland, and Genoese and Turkish galleys began attacking Hospitaller shipping. In 1312, however, the Hospitaller fleet managed to intercept the fleet of Menteshe at the island of Amorgos. The Turks having landed on the island, the Hospitallers burned all 23 Turkish ships, and proceeded to attack the Turks. According to a 15th-century chronicle, over 800 Turks were killed, but the Hospitallers too had heavy losses, with 57 Knights and 300 foot soldiers being killed. A contemporary letter by an Aragonese ambassador to the Council of Vienne, however, mentions 1,500 Turks and 75 Knights killed. In the aftermath of the battle, the Hospitallers captured Kos and castles on the mainland, probably the coast of Menteshe.

== See also ==
- Battle of Chios (1319)
- Battle of Rhodes (1320)

== Sources ==
- Carr, Mike (2013). "The Hospitallers of Rhodes and their Alliances against the Turks". In Buttigieg, Emanuel; Phillips, Simon (eds.). Islands and Military Orders, c.1291–c.1798. Farnham: Ashgate. pp. 167–176. ISBN 978-1-472-40990-4.
- Luttrell, Anthony (1975). "The Hospitallers at Rhodes, 1306–1421". In Setton, Kenneth M.; Hazard, Harry W. (eds.). A History of the Crusades, Volume III: The Fourteenth and Fifteenth Centuries. Vol. 3. Madison and London: University of Wisconsin Press. pp. 278–313. ISBN 0-299-06670-3.
