= Maurice of Pagnac =

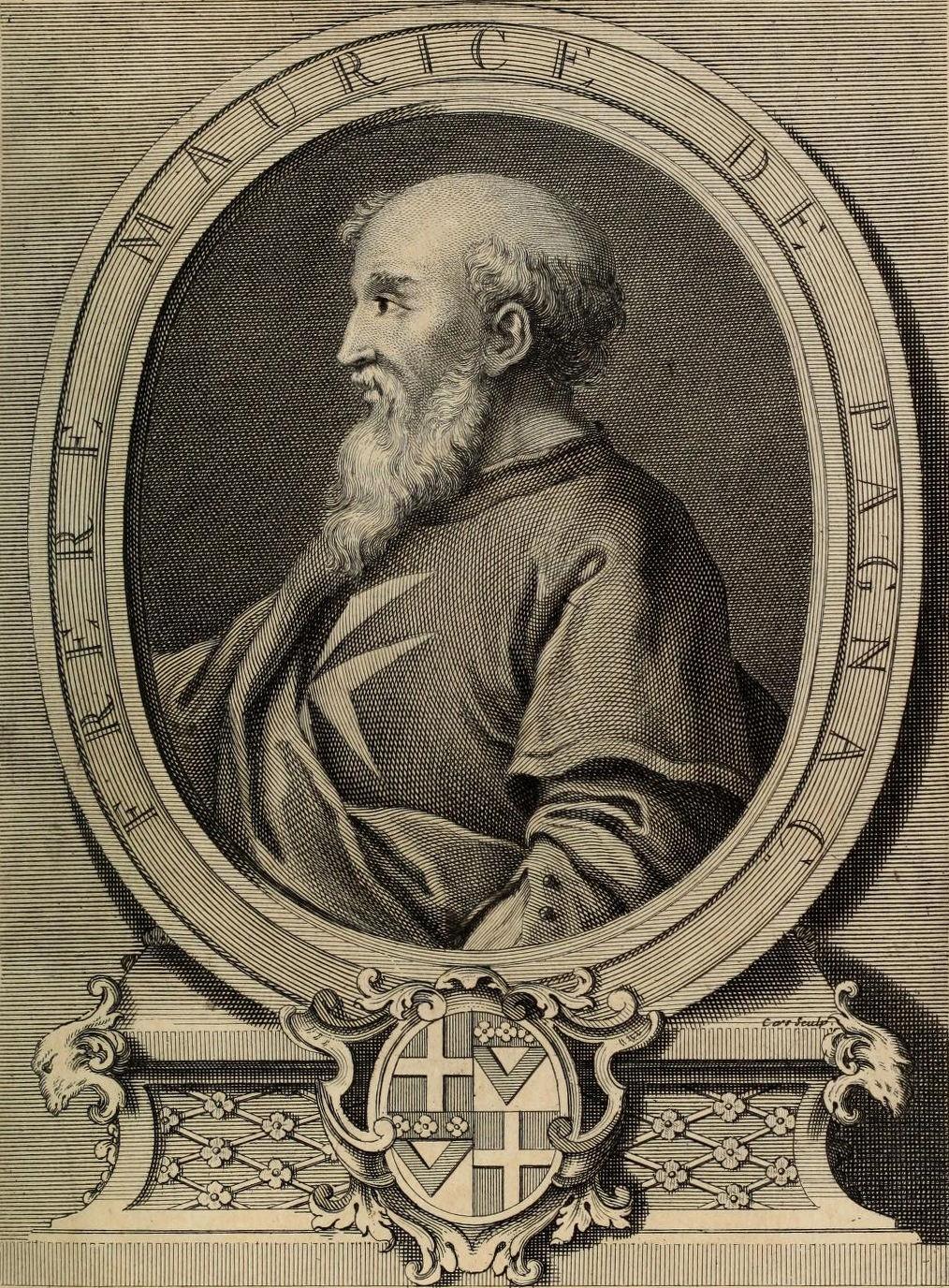
Maurice of Pagnac

Maurice of Pagnac was a member of the Knights Hospitaller who was briefly installed as Grand Master in 1317–19, after the Order overthrew Foulques de Villaret. His election was not recognized by Pope John XXII, who re-installed Villaret.

Little is known about Maurice of Pagnac, except that before his election as Grand Master, he was draper of the order. In 1317, fed up by Grand Master Fulk of Villaret's increasing despotism and extravagance, as well as his military expeditions in the Dodecanese—which included the capture of the island of Rhodes, where the Order now established itself as a sovereign state—the leading members of the Order attempted to assassinate Villaret. Warned by his chamberlain, the Grand Master managed to escape to the castle of Lindos, while the Order chose Maurice of Pagnac as the new Grand Master. The dispute was then brought before the Pope, who in early 1319 rejected Pagnac's election, mostly due to Villaret's continuing popularity in Western Europe, but soon after, Villaret was pressured to resign, and in June 1319 he was replaced by Hélion of Villeneuve. Pagnac was compensated with one half of the preceptory of Cyprus, the other half going to Albert of Schwarzburg.

== Sources ==
- Burgtorf, Jochen (2008). The Central Convent of Hospitallers and Templars: History, Organization, and Personnel (1099/1120–1310). Leiden and Boston: BRILL. ISBN 978-90-04-16660-8.
- Luttrell, Anthony (1975). "The Hospitallers at Rhodes, 1306–1421". In Hazard, Harry W. (ed.). A History of the Crusades, Volume III: The fourteenth and fifteenth centuries. University of Wisconsin Press. pp. 278–313. ISBN 0-299-06670-3.

Preceded by Foulques de Villaret	Grand Master of the Knights Hospitaller (unrecognized); 1317–1319	Succeeded by Foulques de Villaret
