= Hospitaller conquest of Rhodes =

1306-10 conflict between the Knights Hospitaller and the Byzantine Empire

- Part of the Crusades
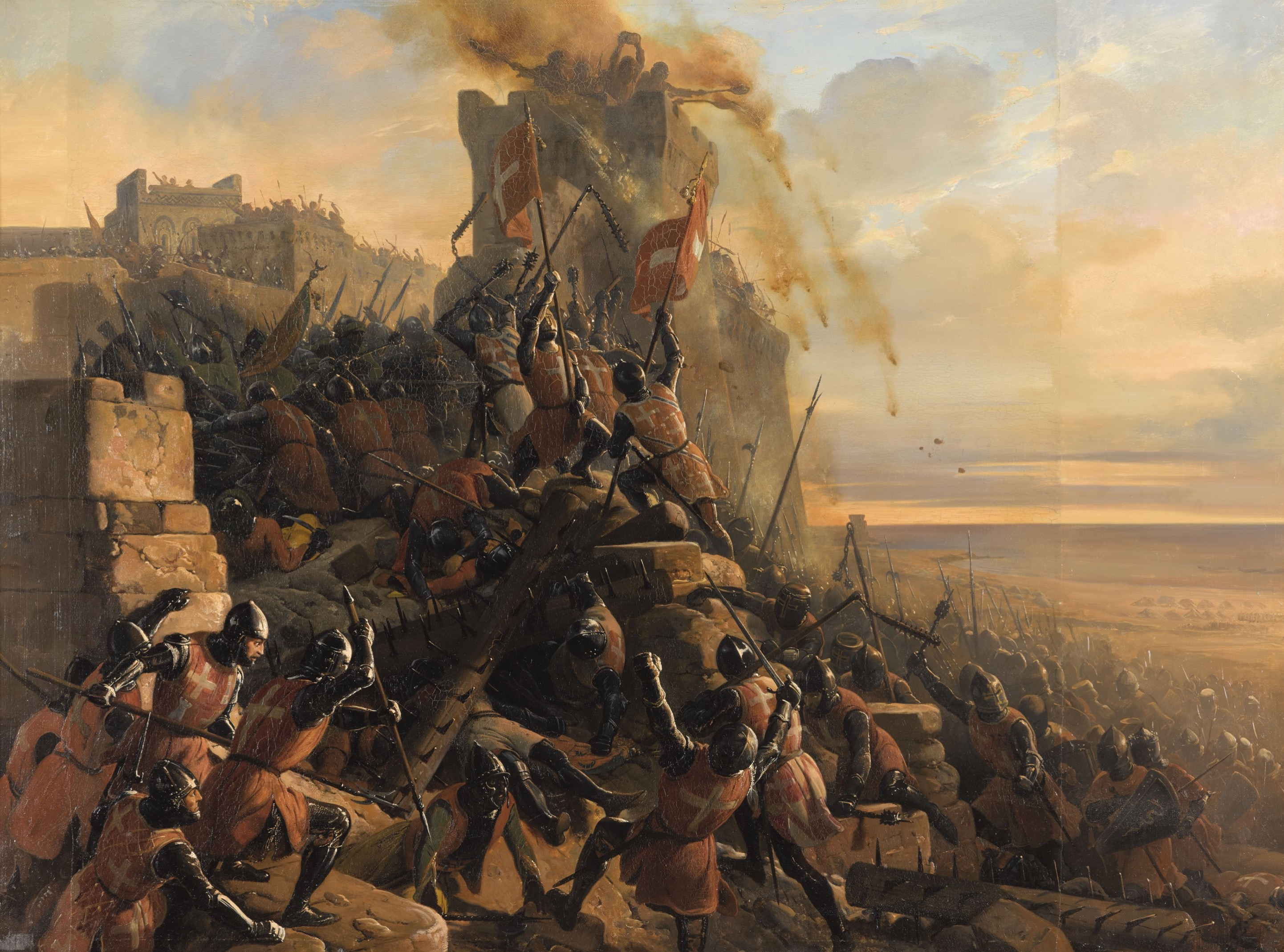
- Prise de Rhodes, 15 août 1310 (oil on canvas by Éloi Firmin Féron, 1838–1839)
Date	23 June 1306 – 15 August 1310
Location	Rhodes, Dodecanese
Result	Hospitaller victory

Belligerents
Knights Hospitaller	Byzantine Empire

Commanders and leaders
Foulques de Villaret	Andronikos II

Strength
Unknown	Unknown

Casualties and losses
Unknown	Unknown

The Knights Hospitaller, led by Grand Master Foulques de Villaret, landed on Rhodes in summer 1306 and quickly conquered most of it except for the city of Rhodes, which remained in Byzantine hands. Emperor Andronikos II Palaiologos sent reinforcements, which allowed the city to repel the initial Hospitaller attacks, and persevere until it was captured on 15 August 1310. The Hospitallers transferred their base to the island, which became the centre of their activities until it was conquered by the Ottoman Empire in 1522.

Pope Clement V attempted to solicit funds for the Hospitallers with crusade preaching, but the preachers fomented an unwanted popular crusade, the Crusade of the Poor, which grew independently of the small professional army of the Hospitallers.

== Sources ==
The conquest of Rhodes by the Knights Hospitaller is narrated by a large number of sources of varying detail and reliability. The most reliable sources include the contemporary Byzantine historian George Pachymeres, whose History only extends to 1307, and the various biographies of Clement V (r. 1305–1314), which offer different details, but do not contradict each other, and are generally reliable. These are complemented by a number of papal ordinances and correspondence in the archives of the Holy See and the Crown of Aragon, as well as the 14th-century French chronicle of Gérard de Monréal (or Chronicle of the Templar of Tyre), and the 16th-century Italian chronicles of Francesco Amadi and Florio Bustron. These are chiefly concerned with the affairs of Cyprus and the troubled relationship between the Hospitallers and the Lusignan kings of the island, and are not very reliable as histories, containing much popular tradition and anecdotal or legendary information.

== Background ==
Founded in Jerusalem in 1070, the Order of the Hospital became one of the most important military orders, with a significant presence not only in the Crusader states of the Levant, but also controlling large properties in Western Europe. Following the Fall of Acre in 1291, the Order had moved its base to Limassol in Cyprus. Their position in Cyprus was precarious; their limited income made them dependent on donations from Western Europe and involved them in quarrels with King Henry II of Cyprus, while the loss of Acre and the Holy Land led to widespread questioning on the purpose of the monastic orders, and proposals to confiscate their possessions. According to Gérard de Monréal, as soon as he was elected as Grand Master of the Knights Hospitaller in 1305, Foulques de Villaret planned the conquest of Rhodes, which would ensure him a liberty of action that he could not have as long as the Order remained on Cyprus, and would provide a new base for war against the Turks.

Rhodes was an attractive target: a fertile island, it was strategically located off the southwestern coast of Asia Minor, astride the trade routes to either Constantinople or Alexandria and the Levant. The island was a Byzantine possession, but the empire was in crisis following the Turkish conquest of most of its territories in Asia in the first years of the 14th century and in the face of the devastation of its European territories by the Catalan Company. Its control of its Aegean island territories was increasingly tenuous and in places delegated to Genoese freebooters, who mingled naval service to Byzantium with opportunistic aggression. In 1305 the Genoese Benedetto Zaccaria, already ruler of the port of Phokaia under Byzantine sovereignty, had requested the island of Chios from the Emperor Andronikos II Palaiologos (r. 1282–1328), in order to protect it from the Turks and Catalans, before seizing it by force and then securing recognition of his control from the emperor. In the Dodecanese, Andronikos's Genoese admiral Andrea Moresco and his brother Lodovico had been assigned the islands of Kassos and Karpathos, and their relative Vignolo de' Vignoli claimed Kos and Leros and the district of Lardos on Rhodes by imperial grants. However, the power of these Byzantine clients in the islands was forcefully contested by the Republic of Venice and various families of its citizens, who had originally established themselves in the region under the authority of the now defunct Latin Empire of Constantinople.

The repudiation of the Union of Lyons on the accession of Andronikos in 1282 had reopened the schism between the eastern and western churches and Byzantium was again regarded as a legitimate target for crusading and other military aggression in the name of Latin Christendom. In 1299, the Pope had proposed that Frederick III of Sicily capture Rhodes, and his half-brother Sancho, a Hospitaller knight, led an unsuccessful expedition in Greek waters in 1305, aiming to capture some Byzantine islands. In the same year, the scholar Raymond Lull identified Rhodes as a suitable base for naval operations to prevent Christians from trading with the Muslims, and advocated its capture as part of plans for a new crusade in the East by Charles of Valois, the titular Latin Emperor.

The Cypriot chronicles indicate that Foulques de Villaret entered into a contract with a Genoese, named as Boniface di Grimaldi by Gérard de Monréal and Vignolo de' Vignoli by the two Italian chronicles. The latter are probably correct, since a document survives, dated 27 May 1306, concluded between Villaret and other representatives of the Order and Vignolo. The latter thereby ceded his rights on Kos and Leros to the Hospitallers, with the right of retaining Lardos and one more estate of his own choice on Rhodes. In the other islands near Rhodes they would conquer, Vignolo would enjoy extensive rights as "vicarius seu justiciarius", albeit the Knights themselves and their servants would be under the direct jurisdiction of the Grand Master. Vignolo and the Knights would jointly appoint the tax collectors for the islands other than Rhodes, and would divide their income, with two thirds going to the Order and one third to Vignolo. Pope Clement V was most likely kept in the dark about the Hospitallers' designs on Rhodes, as no mention of it is made in the contemporary correspondence between the Pope and Villaret.

== Conquest of the island ==
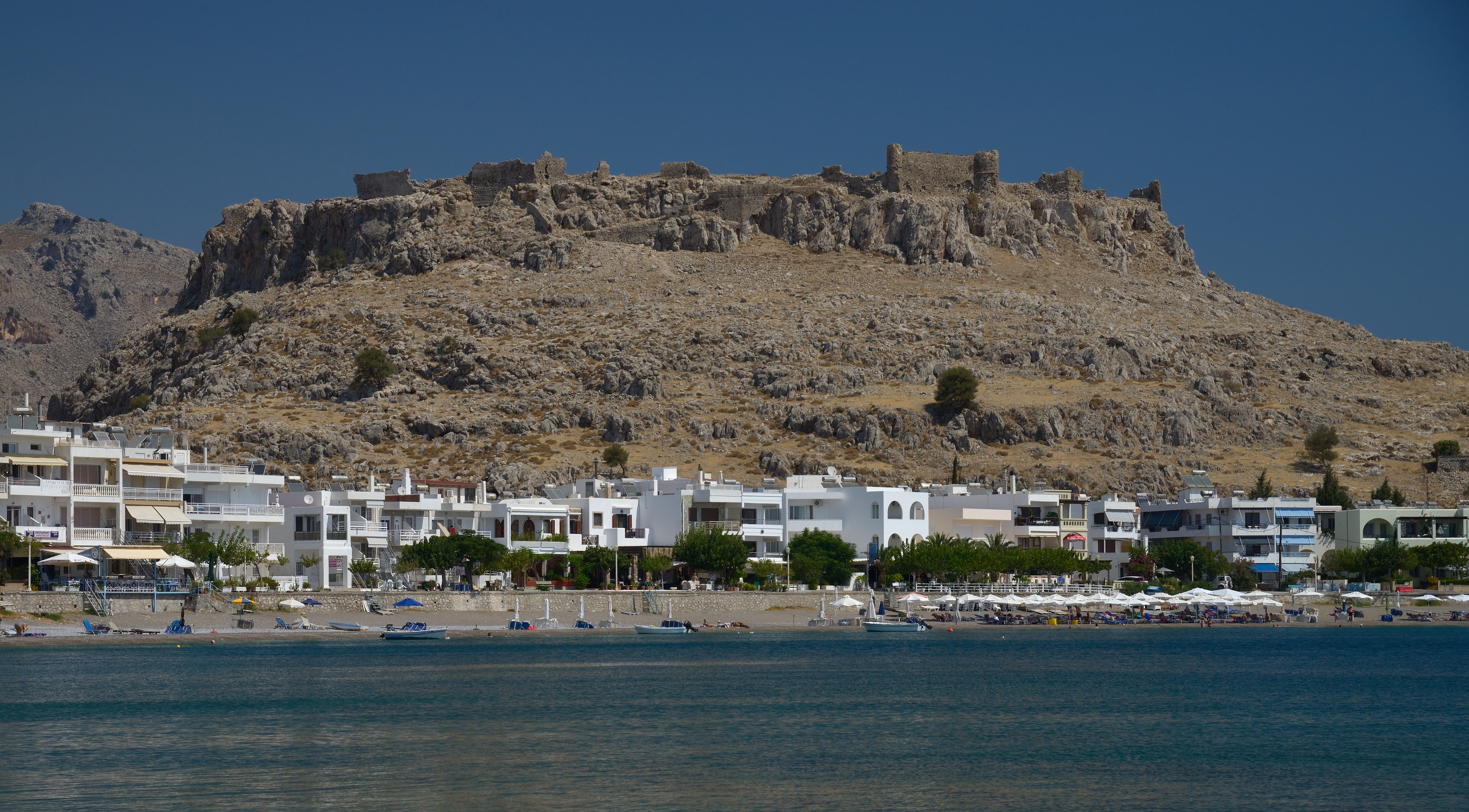
The Castle of Feraklos in 2016

On 23 June, Villaret and Vignolo sailed from Limassol, with two war galleys and four other vessels, carrying a force of 35 Knights, 6 Levantine horsemen, and 500 foot soldiers. To them were added some Genoese ships. The expedition first put in at Kastellorizo, whence Vignolo went ahead to reconnoitre Rhodes. The locals were warned, however, by a Greek serving the Order, and Vignolo barely escaped and made it back to rendezvous with Villaret. In the meantime, two Knights with fifty men had captured the castle of Kos, but were evicted again by Byzantine reinforcements. The allies then sailed to Rhodes. The chronicles of Amadi and Bustron provide the most detailed account of subsequent events: a first assault on the city of Rhodes by land and sea failed, but on 20 September, the Hospitallers captured the (probably deserted) Feraklos Castle on the island's eastern coast. Five days later they launched another unsuccessful attack on the city, which resisted until November. On 11 November, they took the citadel of Filerimos (ancient Ialysos) through the treason of a local Greek; the garrison of 300 Turks was massacred.

This success encouraged the Knights to resume the siege of the capital, but the locals defended it with success, and asked for reinforcements from Emperor Andronikos II. In a letter of 30 April 1307, preserved in the royal archives of Aragon, some details are given: the Emperor sent eight galleys to aid the city, and the Hospitallers were forced to lift the siege after killing 80 Greeks and losing about a dozen of their own and about 40 horses. At about the same time, in March or April 1307, according to Pachymeres, the Hospitallers sent envoys to the Emperor, demanding that he hand over the city of Rhodes to them, so that they would make it their base in their war against the Turks. The Knights promised to recognise the suzerainty of the emperor and send him 300 of their best warriors whenever he demanded, but Andronikos II rejected their proposal, and began preparing further reinforcements to Rhodes to repel any attempt to capture it. In spring 1307, Pope Clement V invited Villaret to visit the Papal court at Poitiers, but the latter was delayed until August due to the ongoing conquest of Rhodes, which he was leading in person. The fact that Villaret felt able to leave the island in summer points to the conclusion that by that time, most of it, apart from the capital was in Hospitaller hands. On 5 September 1307, the Pope issued an act confirming the Hospitallers' possession of the island of Rhodes. However, a document from the Aragonese archives, dated to October 1307, indicates that while Lindos was in Hospitaller hands, the city of Rhodes was guarded by "twenty vessels of the emperor of Constantinople", and a letter by King James II of Aragon confirms that in March 1309, the Hospitallers still did not control the entire island.

Villaret continued his close relations with the Genoese, who were not only expert sailors and shipbuilders, but also familiar with the Aegean and, just like the Hospitallers, rivals to the Venetians; thus in 1308–1309 Villaret placed contracts for twelve galleys and a navis magna in Genoese shipyards. Villaret remained in the West for two years, but by September 1309 he was seeking permission to return to the East to oversee the completion of the conquest. He left Genoa for Naples in November, and arrived at Brindisi in January 1310. There, the Hospitallers refused to ship any member of the massive, disorderly mob constituting the Crusade of the Poor, who all desired to take part in an unauthorised crusade to the Holy Land. Villaret's fleet reportedly numbered 26 galleys, including Genoese ships, carrying a force of 200–300 Knights and 3,000 foot soldiers, but the bad weather delayed their departure until spring. The ostensible aim of this expedition was to assist Cyprus and the Armenian Kingdom of Cilicia, but Villaret, again most likely without the knowledge of the Pope, used it to finish his conquest of Rhodes.

The city of Rhodes was finally captured on 15 August 1310, according to both the biographies of Clement V and the reports of Christopher of Cyprus. The latter reports that the Hospitallers had amassed 35 galleys for the operation. According to the three Cypriot chronicles, however, the city was not captured by force, but through a stroke of luck: a Genoese ship sent by the Emperor with victuals for the besieged garrison was blown off course to Famagusta on Cyprus. The ship captain was captured by a Cypriot knight, Peter the Younger (Pierre le Jaune, Piero il Giovene), who brought him to Rhodes before the Grand Master. To escape execution, the ship captain convinced the garrison to surrender on the condition that their lives and property would be spared.

== Dating controversy ==
The chronology of the conquest was for long accepted to have been in two stages, with the first landing and conquest of the island in 1306 and the final capture of the city of Rhodes in 1310. However, the French scholar Joseph Delaville Le Roulx, in his magisterial Cartulaire général de l'Ordre des Hospitaliers de Saint-Jean de Jérusalem (1100–1310), relying on the account of Pachymeres (which he places in April 1308) and the reports of a two-year siege in the Cypriot chronicles, concluded that the date of the capture of the city of Rhodes was 15 August 1308, a date which was then used by the majority of scholars dealing with the Crusades and the Knights Hospitaller. The confusion of the various dates given by the chroniclers has resulted in several proposals on when the capital of Rhodes surrendered: although the date of 15 August, as a major religious festival, seems secure, the year this took place has varied, with every year from 1306 to 1310 having been suggested by modern scholars.

== Aftermath ==
Following the completion of the conquest, the Hospitallers moved their convent and hospital from Cyprus to Rhodes. Efforts were made to attract Latin settlers, both to replenish the local population that had dwindled to some 10,000, and to provide men for military service. The Order lost no time in beginning military operations in the area: enforcing a papal ban on trade with Mamluk Egypt, the Knights did not hesitate to capture even Genoese vessels, although the Genoese had aided the conquest. A brief alliance of the Genoese with the emirate of Menteshe followed, but the Hospitallers scored a significant victory over the latter in 1312. Tensions rose with Venice at the same time, as the Hospitallers seized Karpathos and other Venetian-controlled islands. Eventually, the Hospitallers reached an agreement with both Italian maritime powers, and the seized islands were returned to Venice in 1316. The grand preceptor Albert of Schwarzburg led the Hospitaller navy to victories against the Turks in 1318, and at the Battle of Chios in 1319, after which he recaptured the island of Leros, whose Greek populace had rebelled and restored Byzantine rule. In the next year, the Hospitallers defeated a Turkish fleet of eighty vessels, preventing an invasion of Rhodes. With this success, Hospitaller control of the island was secured for the next century.

== Sources ==
- Carr, Mike (2015). Merchant Crusaders in the Aegean, 1291–1352. Boydell & Brewer. ISBN 978-1-843839903.
- Failler, Albert (1992). "L'occupation de Rhodes par les Hospitaliers". Revue des études byzantines (in French). 50: 113–135. doi:10.3406/rebyz.1992.1854.
- Luttrell, Anthony (1975). "The Hospitallers at Rhodes, 1306–1421". In Setton, Kenneth M.; Hazard, Harry W. (eds.). A History of the Crusades, Volume III: The Fourteenth and Fifteenth Centuries. Vol. 3. Madison and London: University of Wisconsin Press. pp. 278–313. ISBN 0-299-06670-3.
- Luttrell, Anthony (1988). "The Hospitallers of Rhodes Confront the Turks, 1306–1421". In Gallagher, P. F. (ed.). Christians, Jews, and Other Worlds: Patterns of Conflict and Accommodation. New York and London: University Press of America. pp. 80–116.
- Luttrell, Anthony (1997). "The Genoese at Rhodes: 1306–1312". In Balletto, L. (ed.). Oriente e Occidente tra Medioevo ed età moderna: Studi in onore di Geo Pistarino. Genoa: Acqui Terme. pp. 737–761. OCLC 606372603.
