= Battle of Chios (1319) =

Hospitaller naval victory over Turkish pirates

- Part of the Latin campaigns against Turkish pirates
Date	23 July 1319
Location	off Chios
Result	Hospitaller/Genoese victory

Belligerents
Order of Saint John; Lordship of Chios	Beylik of Aydin

Commanders and leaders
Albert of Schwarzburg; Martino Zaccaria	Mehmed Beg

Strength
31 ships	10 galleys 18 other ships

Casualties and losses
Unknown	22 ships sunk or captured

The Battle of Chios was a naval battle fought off the shore of the eastern Aegean island of Chios between a Latin Christian—mainly Hospitaller—fleet and a Turkish fleet from the Aydinid emirate. The Christian fleet was victorious, but for the Aydinids, who had been engaging in piracy since the collapse of Byzantine power, it was only a temporary setback in their rise to prominence.

== Background ==
The collapse of Byzantine power in western Anatolia and the Aegean Sea in the late 13th century, as well as the disbandment of the Byzantine navy in 1284, created a power vacuum in the region, which was swiftly exploited by the Turkish beyliks and the ghazi raiders. Utilizing local Greek seamen, the Turks began to engage in piracy across the Aegean, targeting especially the numerous Latin island possessions. Turkish corsair activities were aided by the feuds between the two major Latin maritime states, Venice and Genoa. In 1304, the Turks of Menteshe (and later the Aydinids) captured the port town of Ephesus, and the islands of the eastern Aegean seemed about to fall to Turkish raiders. To forestall such a calamitous event, in the same year the Genoese occupied Chios, where Benedetto I Zaccaria established a minor principality, while in ca. 1308 the Knights Hospitaller occupied Rhodes. These two powers would bear the brunt of countering Turkish pirate raids until 1329.

== Battle of Chios and aftermath ==
In July 1319, the Aydinid fleet, under the personal command of the Aydinid emir Mehmed Beg, set sail from the port of Ephesus. It comprised 10 galleys and 18 other vessels. It was met off Chios by a Hospitaller fleet of 24 ships and eighty Hospitaller knights, under Albert of Schwarzburg, to which a squadron of one galley and six other ships were added by Martino Zaccaria of Chios. The battle ended in a crushing Christian victory: only six Turkish vessels managed to escape capture or destruction.

This victory was followed up by the recovery of Leros, whose native Greek population had rebelled in the name of the Byzantine emperor, and by another victory in the next year over a Turkish fleet poised to invade Rhodes. Pope John XXII rewarded Schwarzburg by restoring him to the post of grand preceptor of Cyprus, whence he had been dismissed two years earlier, and promised the commandery of Kos, if he could capture it.

== Impact ==
According to the historian Mike Carr, the victory at Chios was all the more significant because it had been achieved at the initiative of the Hospitallers and the Zaccarias, without any support or funding by other Western powers, most notably the Papacy, which was still embroiled in plans to launch a Crusade to the Holy Land. It did nevertheless influence the strategic calculations of Western powers, and efforts began to form a Christian naval league to counter Turkish piracy.

Nevertheless, in the immediate future, the defeat off Chios could not halt the rise of Aydinid power. The Zaccarias were soon after forced to surrender their mainland outpost of Smyrna to Mehmed's son Umur Beg, under whose leadership Aydinid fleets roamed the Aegean for the next two decades, until the Smyrniote crusades (1343–1351) broke the Aydinid emirate's power.

== See also ==
- Battle of Amorgos (1312)
- Battle of Adramyttion (1334)

== Sources ==
- Carr, Mike (2013). "The Hospitallers of Rhodes and their Alliances against the Turks". In Buttigieg, Emanuel; Phillips, Simon (eds.). Islands and Military Orders, c. 1291–c. 1798. Farnham: Ashgate. pp. 167–176. ISBN 978-1-472-40990-4.
- İnalcık, Halil (1993). "The Rise of the Turcoman Maritime Principalities in Anatolia, Byzantium, and the Crusades" (PDF). The Middle East & the Balkans Under the Ottoman Empire: Essays on Economy & Society. Indiana University Turkish Studies Department. pp. 309–341. ISBN 1-878318-04-7. Archived from the original (PDF) on 2015-09-24.
- Luttrell, Anthony (1975). "The Hospitallers at Rhodes, 1306–1421". In Setton, Kenneth M.; Hazard, Harry W. (eds.). A History of the Crusades, Volume III: The Fourteenth and Fifteenth Centuries. Vol. 3. Madison and London: University of Wisconsin Press. pp. 278–313. ISBN 0-299-06670-3.
