= Roseline of Villeneuve =

Saint Roseline of Villeneuve OCart
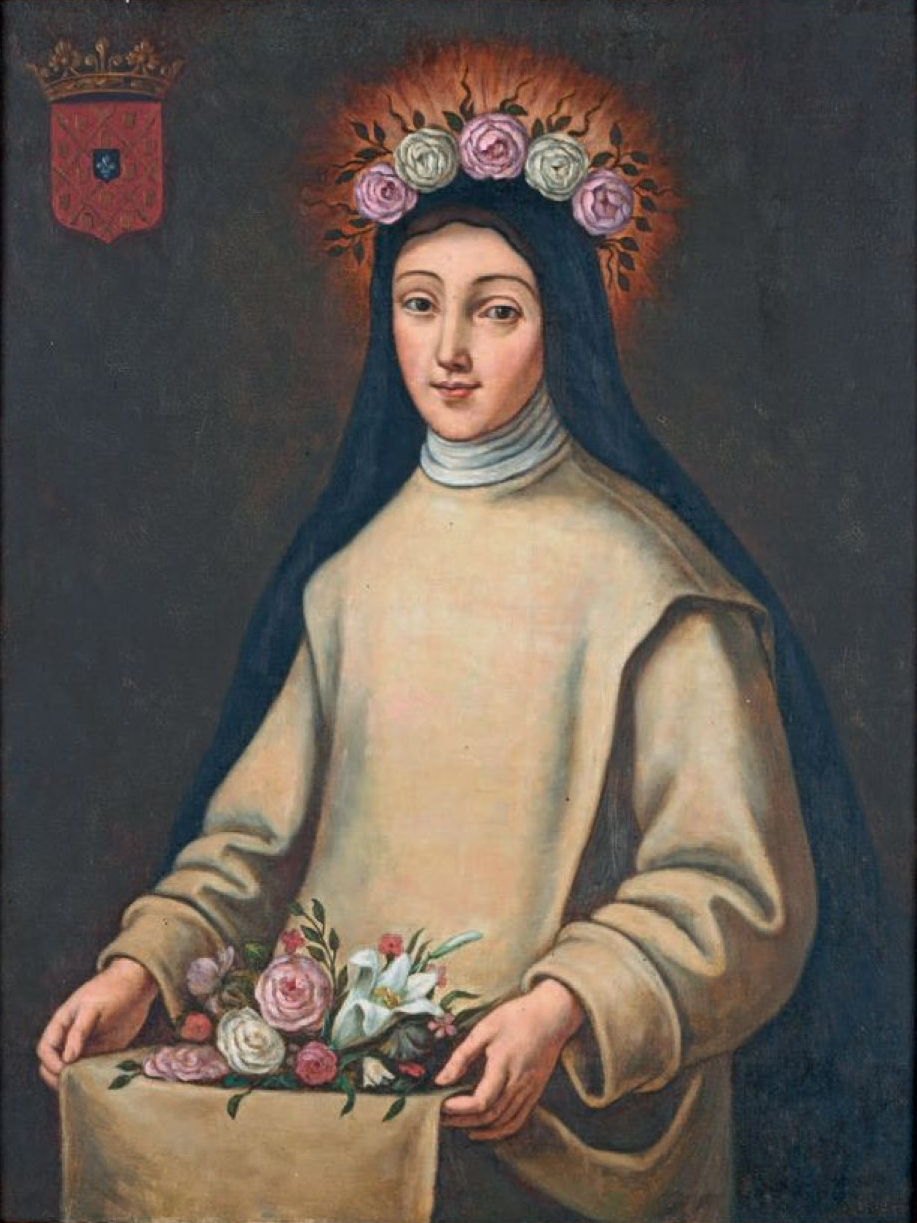
- Roseline of Villeneuve OCart
- Born: around 1263; Château d’Arcs, France
- Died: 17 January 1329; Celle-Roubaud, Les Arcs, France
- Venerated in: Roman-Catholic Church
- Canonized: 1851
- Major shrine: Les Arcs-sur-Argens
- Feast: 17 January, 16 October (Carthusians)
- Attributes: Rosebuds or roses in her scapular, wreath of roses
- Patronage: Charterhouse of Sainte Roseline in Les Arcs, Diocese of Fréjus-Toulon, sailors

Roseline of Villeneuve (1263 – January 17, 1329) was a French Carthusian nun. She is regarded as a saint in the Roman Catholic Church.

== Life ==
Roseline was born to an aristocratic family, at the château of Les Arcs-sur-Argens, Var, in eastern Provence, near Draguignan. As a child, she discreetly distributed food from the chateau larder to the local poor people. A similar Miracle of the roses is told of her, as is attributed to several other saints.

Having overcome her father's opposition, Roseline became a Carthusian nun at Bertaud in the alps of Dauphiné. Her consecration took place in 1288, and in about 1330 she succeeded her aunt, Jeanne (Diane) de Villeneuve, as prioress of La Celle-Robaud in the Diocese of Fréjus near her home. In 1320 her brother Hélion de Villeneuve, Grand Master (1319–46) of the Knights of St. John, restored the monastery, and in 1323 and 1328 Pope John XXII, formerly Bishop of Fréjus, increased its revenue, granting indulgences for the anniversary of the dedication of the church.

Many visions together with extraordinary austerities and great power over demons are ascribed to her. Roseline obtained leave to resign her office before her death in 1329 at the age of sixty-six.

== Veneration ==
Her feast was given in the Acta Sanctorum on 11 June, the day of the first translation of her relics in 1334 by her brother, Elzéar de Villeneuve, Bishop of Digne. It is now observed on her day of death, 17 January. A plenary indulgence has been granted to all those who visit a Carthusian church on that day.

There has always been a local cultus and this was confirmed for the Diocese of Fréjus by a Decree of 1851, for the Carthusian Order in 1857. Roseline is usually represented with a reliquary containing two eyes, recalling the fact that her eyes were removed and preserved apart. This relic was still extant at Arcs in 1882. There is no ancient life of the saint, but that given in the Acta Sanctorum, 2 June, 489 sq., was constructed by Papebroch from ancient documents.

Her shrine, situated at Les Arcs-sur-Argens near Draguignan, has been for six centuries a place of pilgrimage. The Roseline Chapel near the Château Sainte Roseline is located in a private vineyard. It contains the body of Roseline in a glass reliquiary. According to legend, one day Rosaline was so caught up in contemplation that she failed to make dinner for the nuns. Angels came down, prepared the dinner and set the table. This story is depicted at the chapel in a wall mosaic by Chagall.

Roseline de Villeneuve is a patron saint of the Diocese of Fréjus-Toulon and of sailors.
