= Battle of Rhodes (1320) =

1320 naval battle

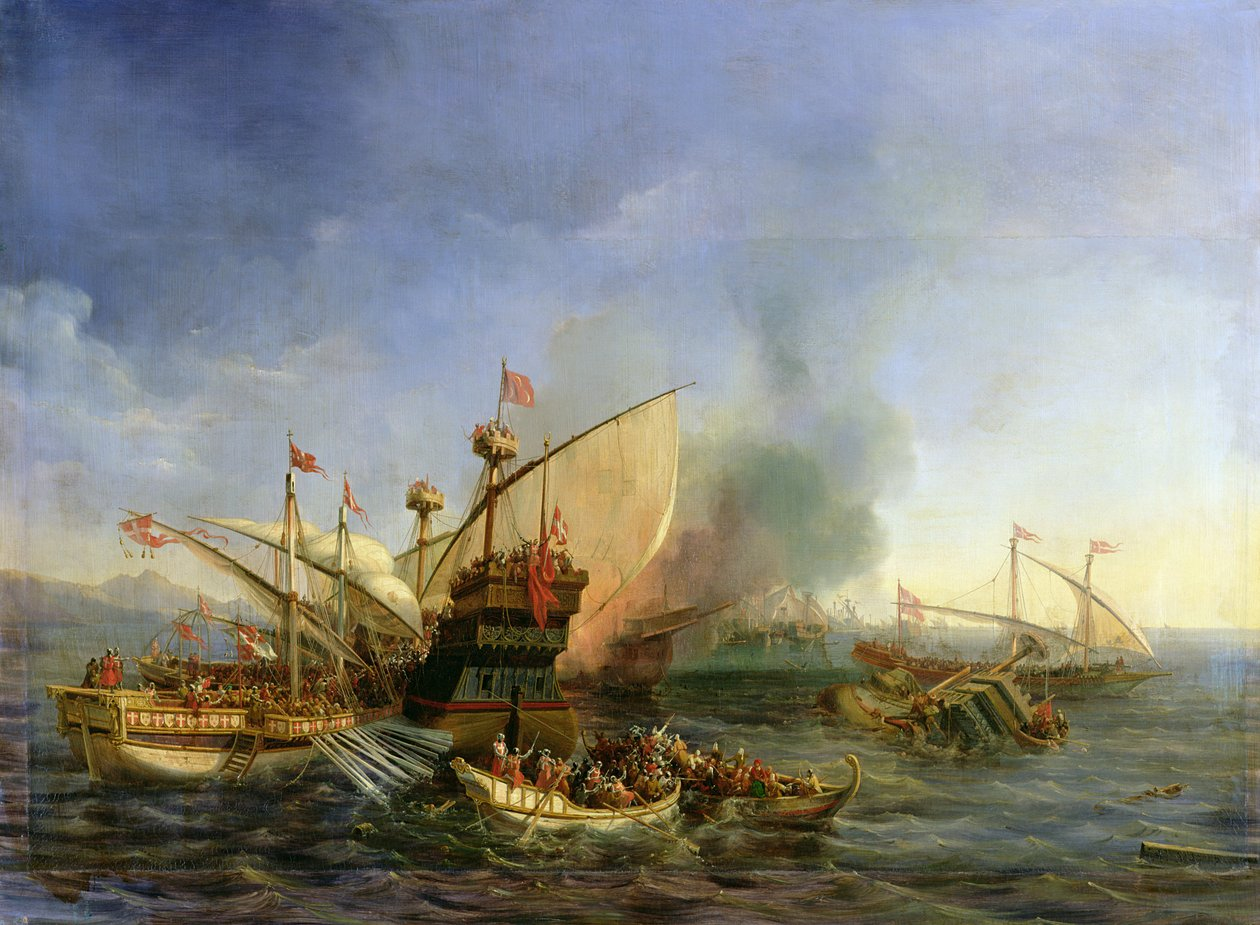
Naval Battle of Episkopi, oil painting by Auguste Étienne François Mayer

In 1320, the Turks of Menteshe launched an unsuccessful attempt to conquer the island of Rhodes from the Knights Hospitaller.

== Background ==
The collapse of Byzantine power in western Anatolia and the Aegean Sea in the late 13th century, as well as the disbandment of the Byzantine navy in 1284, created a power vacuum in the region, which was swiftly exploited by the Turkish beyliks and the ghazi raiders. Utilizing local Greek seamen, the Turks began to engage in piracy across the Aegean, targeting especially the numerous Latin island possessions. Turkish corsair activities were aided by the feuds between the two major Latin maritime states, Venice and Genoa. In 1304, the Turks of Menteshe (and later the Aydinids) captured the port town of Ephesus, and the islands of the eastern Aegean seemed about to fall to Turkish raiders. To forestall such a calamitous event, in the same year the Genoese occupied Chios, where Benedetto I Zaccaria established a minor principality, while in ca. 1308 the Knights Hospitaller occupied Rhodes. In 1319, the Hospitallers under Albert of Schwarzburg defeated an Aydinid fleet at Chios and captured the castle of Leros.

== Defeat of the invasion fleet ==
In 1320—although some sources put it in 1321 or 1322—Rhodes itself was targeted by the Turks of Menteshe, under Orhan Bey. A large army was gathered for the purpose, with a fleet of some 80 ships to carry and protect it to the island. Orhan clearly planned to occupy and settle Rhodes, as he took with him many non-combatants, old men, women and children; before attacking Rhodes, he left them at the small island of Episkopi (Tilos). The Hospitallers urgently gathered what forces he could find, mustering four galleys and twenty smaller vessels, to which were joined six Genoese galleys that happened to be at Rhodes. The Hospitaller–Genoese fleet managed to destroy the Turkish invasion fleet, and then sailed to Episkopi, where the Christians slaughtered or enslaved the Turks left there, reportedly 5,000 or even 10,000 people.

The historian Mike Carr however points out that it is possible that this battle is the result of a confusion by medieval sources with the battle at Chios in 1319.

== Sources ==
- Carr, Mike (2016). "Trade or Crusade? The Zaccaria of Chios and Crusades against the Turks". In Chrissi, Nikolaos G.; Carr, Mike (eds.). Contact and Conflict in Frankish Greece and the Aegean, 1204–1453: Crusade, Religion and Trade between Latins, Greeks and Turks. Routledge. pp. 115–134. ISBN 978-1-4094-3926-4.
- İnalcık, Halil (1993). "The Rise of the Turcoman Maritime Principalities in Anatolia, Byzantium, and the Crusades" (PDF). The Middle East & the Balkans Under the Ottoman Empire: Essays on Economy & Society. Indiana University Turkish Studies Department. pp. 309–341. ISBN 1878318047. Archived from the original (PDF) on 2015-09-24.
- Luttrell, Anthony (1975). "The Hospitallers at Rhodes, 1306–1421". In Setton, Kenneth M.; Hazard, Harry W. (eds.). A History of the Crusades, Volume III: The Fourteenth and Fifteenth Centuries. Vol. 3. Madison and London: University of Wisconsin Press. pp. 278–313. ISBN 0-299-06670-3.
- Zachariadou, Elisabeth A. (1983). Trade and Crusade: Venetian Crete and the Emirates of Menteshe and Aydin (1300–1415). Venice: Hellenic Institute of Byzantine and Post-Byzantine Studies in Venice. OCLC 144691037.
- Wittek, Paul (1934). Das Fürstentum Mentesche. Studien zur Geschichte Westkleinasiens im 13.-15. Jahrhundert (in German). Istanbul: Zaman Kitaphanesi.
