= Albert of Schwarzburg =

14th-century German Knight Hospitaller

Albert of Schwarzburg (died 15 March 1327), in contemporary sources also Albertus Alamanus ("Albert the German") or Albertus de Negro Castro, was a member of the Saxon–Thuringian House of Schwarzburg who became a member of the Knights Hospitaller, rising to be marshal and grand preceptor of the Order, and fighting with success against the Turks.

== Biography ==
Albert was the third son of Count Günter V (IX) of Schwarzenburg (died 1292/3) and his first wife, Irmgard. The date of his birth is unknown and can only be approximately placed between his parents' marriage in 1267, and the second marriage of Günter V in 1283.

Albert appears for the first time in 1306, as witness in a charter at Limassol in Cyprus. He was already a marshal of the Knights Hospitaller, then based in Cyprus. He was a particular favourite and protégé of the then-Grand Master of the Knights Hospitaller, Foulques de Villaret (1305–1319), who promoted him steadily to higher offices. Thus in 1307, Villaret made Albert the Order's preceptor in Cyprus, and allowed Albert to pay only half the stipulated annual dues ("responsions") to the Order. This act, a sign of Villaret's increasingly authoritarian behaviour and corruption, outraged many of the other leading members of the Order, and contributed to the discontent with Villaret's leadership, culminating in his violent deposition in 1317.

In 1310, as the Order's highest-ranking representative on Cyprus, Albert played a crucial role in securing the restoration of King Henry II following the death of Henry's brother Amalric, who had deposed and exiled the king in 1307. The Hospitallers were among Henry's staunchest supporters, and in July, Albert led a contingent of knights to the capital Nicosia to secure it in preparation for Henry's return. Henry, still in exile in Armenian Cilicia, named Fulk of Villaret as one of his lieutenants in Cyprus (along with the nobleman Aygue of Bethsan), but Villaret, unable to come to Cyprus in person due to the ongoing conquest of Rhodes, gave the post to Albert. In this capacity, Albert served Henry on his return in August 1310, and helped him to secure his rule.

In October 1312, Albert was appointed grand preceptor and the Order's representative to the Holy See and the courts of Western Europe, where he travelled as far as England. In his letter of accreditation, Fulk of Villaret fulsomely praised Albert's "discretion, honesty, loyalty, good administrative skills, diligence, and hard work". Among his major tasks in this post was the absorption of the property of the recently dissolved Knights Templar, which had been transferred to the Hospitallers in May 1312. By 1315, Albert was back in Cyprus (he may be the grand preceptor who survived from a shipwreck early in the year) as preceptor of the island, a post he kept until his resignation in 1317, when the Pope demanded that the responsions for Cyprus be once again paid in full.

For the next three years, Albert was active in campaigns against the Turkish raiders around the Order's new base at Rhodes. In 1318 he defeated a Turkish raid, while in the next year, with assistance from Martino Zaccaria, he scored a major victory in a sea battle off Chios on 23 July and recovered Leros, whose Greek inhabitants had risen in revolt. Finally, in 1320 he turned back an attempted Turkish invasion of Rhodes with great loss. In 1319, the Pope also granted Albert half of the preceptory of Cyprus (the other half going to Maurice of Pagnac) for ten years, as well as the island of Kos, in case of its recovery from the Turks.

Between 1323 and 1325, Albert travelled in central Europe, first as a visitor to the Order's lands in Bohemia and Denmark, and then in several missions as envoy on behalf of the Holy Roman Emperor Louis the Bavarian to the Papal court in Avignon. From 1324, Albert also served as the Order's prior in Germany. He died on 15 March 1327 and was buried at the priory of Würzburg.

== Sources ==
- Burgtorf, Jochen (2008). The Central Convent of Hospitallers and Templars: History, Organization, and Personnel (1099/1120–1310). Leiden and Boston: BRILL. ISBN 978-90-04-16660-8.
- Luttrell, Anthony (1975). "The Hospitallers at Rhodes, 1306–1421". In Hazard, Harry W. (ed.). A History of the Crusades, Volume III: The fourteenth and fifteenth centuries. University of Wisconsin Press. pp. 278–313.
