= Mesut of Menteshe =

Chieftain of Menteshe

Mesut was a bey of Menteshe, one of the Anatolian beyliks (principalities).

== Background ==
In the second half of the 13th century, the Seljuks of Anatolia became a puppet of the Mongols and the vassal Turkmen tribes began to act independently. Mesut was the son of Menteshe, a tribe leader who had settled his tribe in Caria (southwestern Anatolia, presently Muğla Province and parts of Aydın and Antalya Provinces of Turkey).

== As a leader ==
After his father's death in 1282 (?), Mesut became the new bey. He controlled most of the beylik except Finike (ancient Phoenicus at the extreme east of the beylik ) which was under his brother's rule.

In the early years of his reign, he fought against the Byzantine army which tried to recapture the Caria region. Mesut was able to defend his territory. After Byzantine army returned, he began attacking nearby islands by his newly founded fleet. His crew was composed of Greek converts as well as the Turkmens. By this navy he attacked the island Rhodes and captured most of the island in 1300. However, in 1310 Knights Hospitaller recaptured the island with the help of Philip IV of France. Mesut tried to capture the island for the second time with the help of the Republic of Genoa. But he was not successful.

== Death ==
Mesut probably died in 1319. He was succeeded by his son Orhan.
