= Foulques de Villaret =

25th Grand Master of the Knights Hospitaller from 1305 to 1319

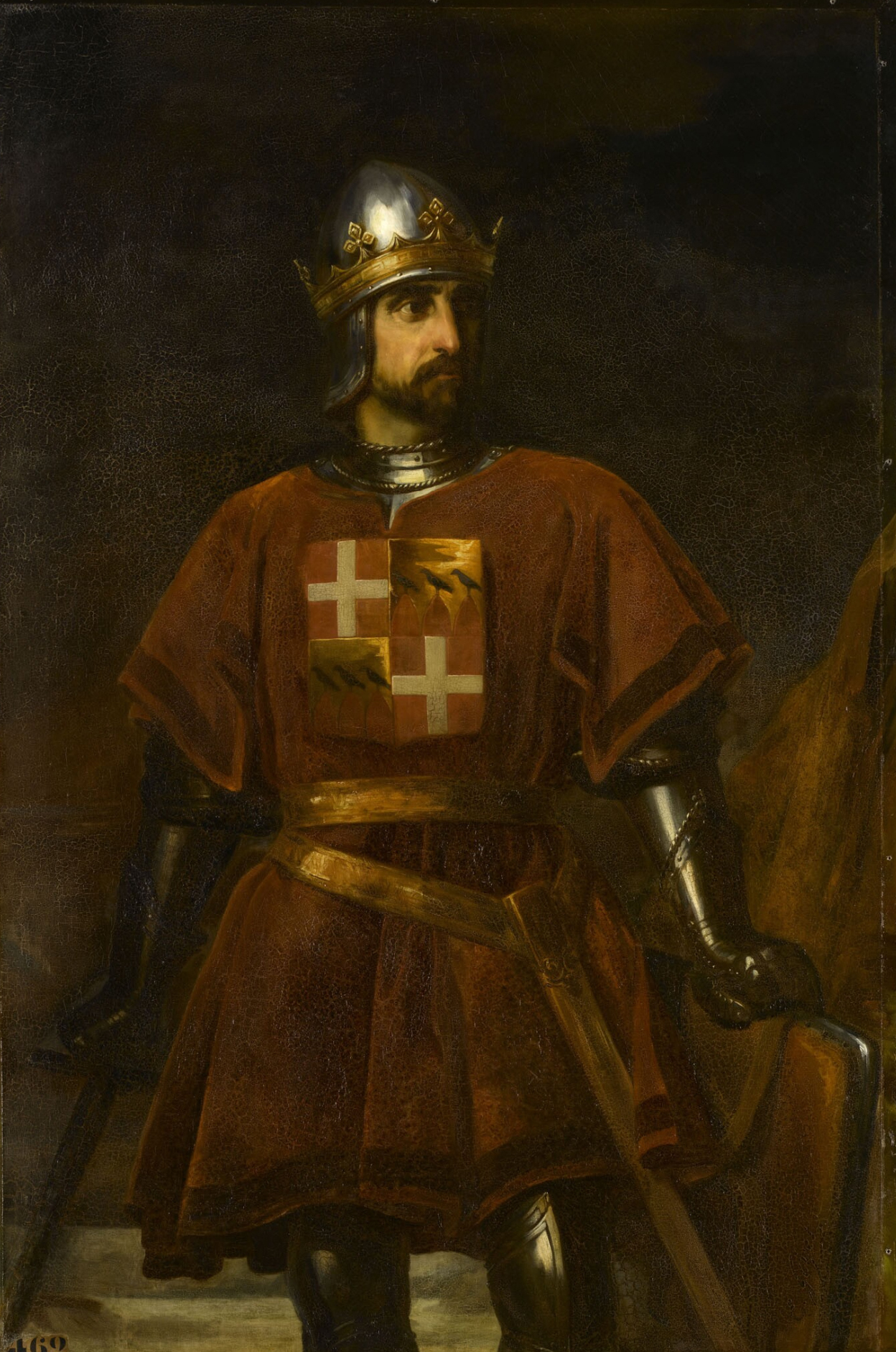
- Portrait by Eugène Goyet, 1841.

25th Grand Master of the Knights Hospitaller
- In office 1305–1319
- Preceded by: Guillaume de Villaret
- Succeeded by: Hélion de Villeneuve

Personal details
- Died: September 1, 1327

Military service
- Allegiance: (Sovereign Military Order of Malta) Knights Hospitaller
- Battles/wars: Conquest of Rhodes

Foulques de Villaret (Occitan: Folco del Vilaret, Catalan: Folc del Vilaret; died 1 September 1327), was the 25th Grand Master of the Knights Hospitaller. He led the successful conquest of Rhodes and survived an assassination attempt by members of his own order.

== Biography ==
A native of Languedoc-Roussillon, France, his uncle was Grand Master Guillaume de Villaret. He was born around 1240 to Gaucelin de Villaret. HE served as commander at Millau between 1259 and 1260.

His uncle had done much to foster his early career in the Order, with Foulques being appointed Admiral in 1299 and Grand Commander two years later. By 1303 he was Lieutenant of the Master, and advanced to rank of Grand Master on his uncle's death.

Under his leadership, the Order launched the conquest of Rhodes, in the years 1308 and 1309. Other islands were also taken, including Kastellórizo and Bodrum. The Hospitallers then moved their headquarters to Rhodes.

However, despite the huge benefits to his Order from the suppression of the Knights Templar (the Templars' assets were assigned to the Hospitallers by the Pope in 1312), Villaret's campaigns of territorial expansion ran the Order heavily into debt, and these debts were not paid off until the mid-1330s. Villaret seems to have been a difficult and overbearing man, and eventually alienated his Order.

Allegations were made of increasingly arrogant, even tyrannical, behaviors, although none of the allegations are specific, and one Italian account of the lives of the Grand Masters claimed that he was treated unjustly. In 1317, the Order attempted a coup against Villaret. A group of knights went to assassinate him at his residence at Rhodini, but his chamberlain aided his escape. He fled to the Hospitaller castle at Lindos, where he was besieged by his own Order. They had, in the meantime, elected Maurice de Pagnac as Grand Master in his place, and wrote to Pope John XXII in July to justify their actions.

The Pope summoned both Grand Masters to his court at Avignon to settle the dispute. Meanwhile, Brother Giraud de Pins administered the Order in the Pope's name. The Pope reappointed Villaret – but only so that he could tender his resignation formally. Brother Hélion de Villeneuve was named as Master on 18 June 1319, the elderly Pagnac having died in the meantime. The Pope appointed Villaret as Prior of Capua for life on 29 June, but after more problems there, he was transferred to the Priory of Rome in 1325. That, too, seems to have been unsuccessful, and after April that year, he received only a pension. He returned to his homeland and lived as a mere Brother of the Order at his sister's home in Teyran, near Montpellier. He died on 1 September 1327 and was buried in the former Templar Church at Montpellier.

== Sources ==
- Luttrell, Anthony. "Notes on Foulques de Villaret, Master of the Hospital 1305-1319" in The Hospitallers of Rhodes and the Mediterranean World (Aldershot 1992).

Preceded by Guillaume de Villaret	Grand Master of the Knights Hospitaller; 1305–1319	Succeeded by Hélion de Villeneuve
