= Hélion de Villeneuve =

Grand Master of the Knights Hospitaller

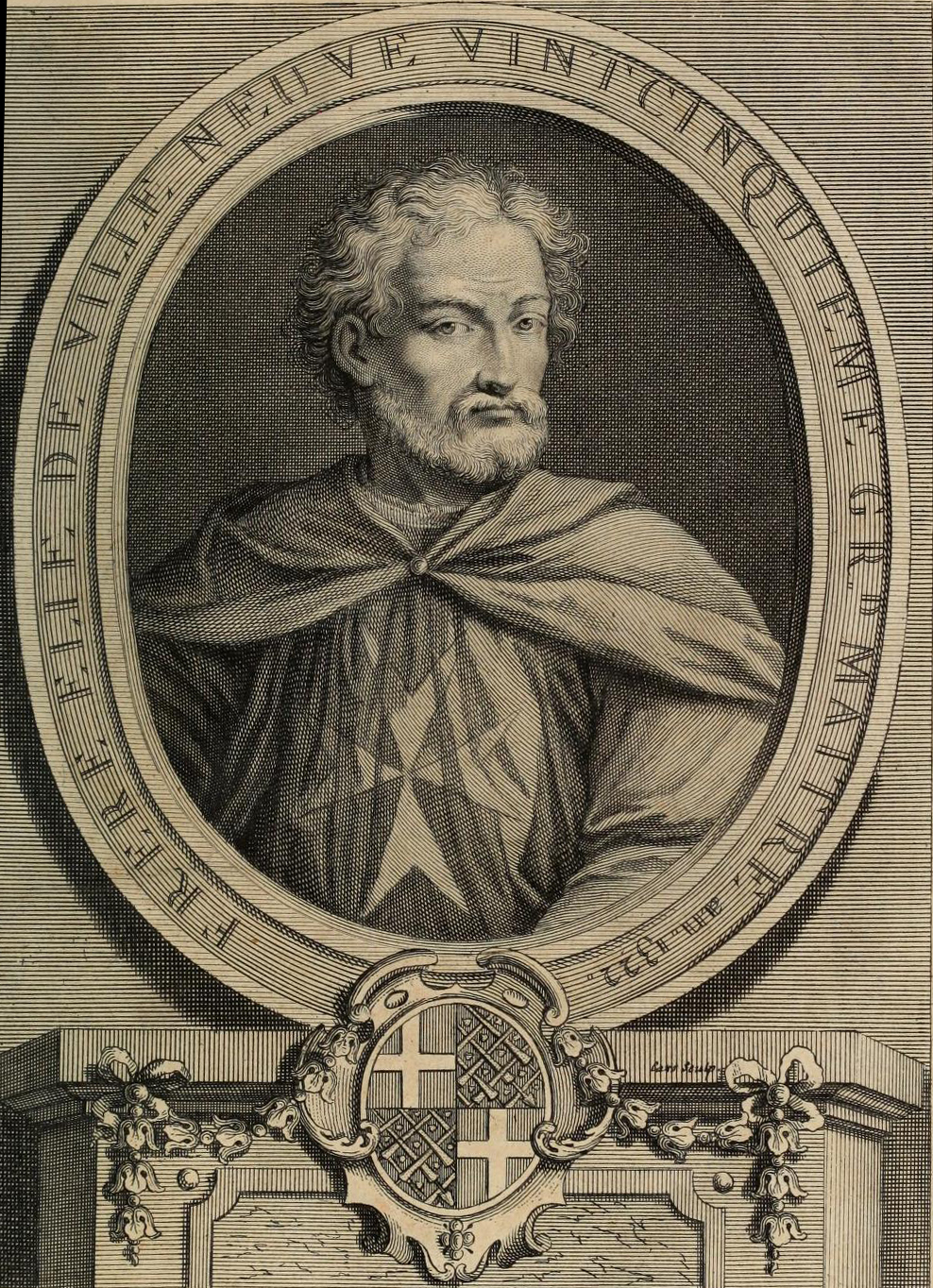
Hélion de Villeneuve

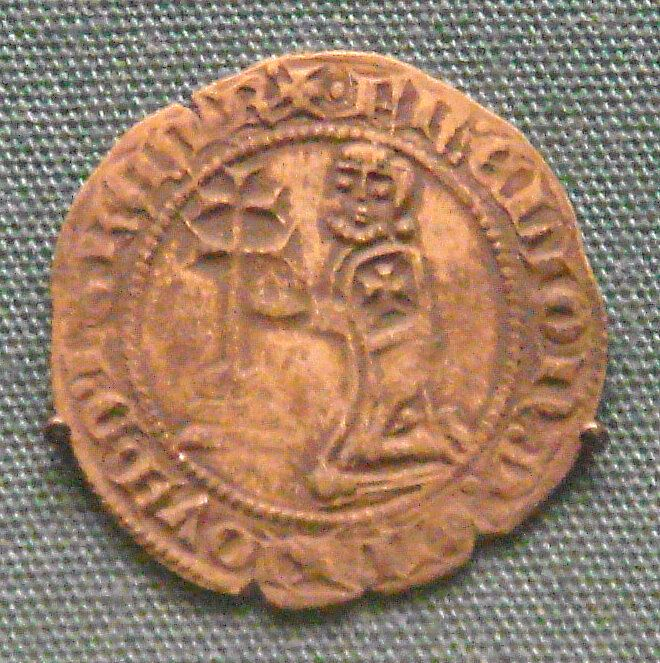
Silver gigliato of Helion de Villeuneuve, Grand Master of the Knights of Rhodes, 1319-1346

Hélion de Villeneuve (c. 1270 – 27 May 1346) was a French-born Grand Master of the Knights of St. John. He was the brother of Roseline of Villeneuve, OCart. Hélion died on the island of Rhodes.

The blazon of Hélion's coat-of-arms was Gules six tilting spears in fretty, in-between the spears semy of escutcheons, all or.

There is a legend told of Hélion involving a dragon and a young knight.

Preceded by Foulques de Villaret	Grand Master of the Knights Hospitaller; 1319–1346	Succeeded by Dieudonné de Gozon
