= Menteshe =

Anatolian beylik

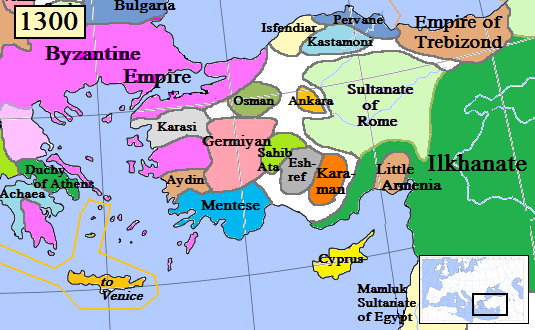
The Beylik of Menteshe (blue) in 1300

Menteshe (Ottoman Turkish: منتشه, Turkish: Menteşe) was the first of the Turkish Anatolian beyliks (principality), the frontier principalities established by the Oghuz Turks after the decline of the Seljuk Sultanate of Rum. Founded in 1260/1290, it was named for its founder, Menteshe Bey. Its capital city was Milas (Mylasa) in southwestern Anatolia.

The heartland of the beylik corresponded roughly to ancient Caria or to the early modern Muğla Province in Turkey, including the province's three protruding peninsulas. Among the important centers within the beylik were the cities of Beçin, Milas, Balat, Elmalı, Finike, Kaş, Mağrı (modern Fethiye), Muğla, Çameli, Acıpayam, Tavas, Bozdoğan, and Çine. The city of Aydın (formerly Tralles) was controlled by this beylik for a time, during which it was called "Güzelhisar"; it later was transferred to the Aydinids in the north, who renamed the city for the founder of their dynasty.

== History ==
=== Independent Beylik ===
The Beylik of Menteshe was a regional naval power of its time. They were sometimes referred to as the Sea Turks as they were the first seafaring Beylik. Menteshe managed to briefly conquer part of Rhodes in 1300 under Mesut Bey. Venetian sources indicate that Venetian merchants carried out trade with Menteshe, particularly the port of Mağrı, during the latter half of the 13th Century, as a continuation of a trade relationship that had begun under the Seljuks. This trade relationship increased after 1300. Most of the Venetian merchants active in this trade were based in the Venetian colony of Crete. Goods sent by Menteshe to Crete included grain, horses, and alum. Despite this mercantile relationship, ships originating in Menteshe frequently engaged in piracy.

In 1311, a joint fleet of Genoese and Menteshe ships attacked the Hospitallers on Rhodes, but failed to capture the island. After 1332, Orhan Bey of Menteshe managed to extract tribute from Negroponte and various Venetian islands of the Aegean Sea. Menteshe's neighbor, the Aydin Beylik, was defeated in 1334 by a Holy League of Christian forces at the Battle of Adramyttion. This was followed by two crusades against the Aydinid port of Smyrna between 1343 and 1351. Because Menteshe was mostly not involved in these conflicts, it benefited from a temporary monopoly on Aegean trade with the Christians, especially with Crete.

The Beylik produced fine boats using special trees harvested from the expansive forests in the high coastal mountains. These boats sailed well and were well built and the models for today's Gulet Sailboats, which are prevalent in the Aegean in both Greece and Turkey. Today, the present-day Mugla continues to be a major shipbuilding region where many luxury yachts are now produced for export.

=== Ottoman Rule ===
Menteshe was weakened by a devastating earthquake in 1389. Menteşe Bey first submitted to Ottoman rule in 1390, during the reign of Bayezid I, "the Thunderbolt". After 1402, Tamerlane restored the beylik to Menteşoğlu İlyas Bey, who recognized Ottoman overlordship in 1414. A dozen years later, in 1426, Menteshe was incorporated into the Ottoman realm. Menteshe continued to be known for its naval prowess. During the Siege of Constantinople in 1453, approximately 40% of the Ottoman Navy was from the Menteshe Beylik.

Architecturally, the Menteshe Beylik had a significant impact on later Ottoman Architecture. They were the first Beylik to construct large precision cut stone buildings and became experts in building domes and archways. The region itself was an important source of marble and stone since the Roman times and continues to be Turkey's top stone export region. They also left important works of architecture, such as the Firus Bey Mosque in Milas and İlyas Bey Mosque in Balat.

== Legacy ==
The present-day Muğla Province of Turkey was named the sub-province (sanjak) of Menteshe until the early years of the Republic of Turkey, although the provincial seat had been moved from Milas to Muğla with the establishment of Ottoman rule in the 15th century.

== List of Beys ==
| Bey | Reign | Notes |
|---|---|---|
| Menteshe Bey | 1261–1282 | |
| Mesut Bey | 1282–1319 | |
| Orhan Bey | 1320–1341 | |
| Ibrahim Bey | 1341–1359 | |
| Musa Bey Gıyaseddin Mehmed Bey Gazi Ahmed Bey | 1359–1374 1359–1390 1359–1391 | Co-rule of three |
Ottoman rule (1391–1402)
| Ilyas Bey | 1402–1424 | |

== See also ==
- List of Sunni Muslim dynasties

== Sources ==
- Wittek, Paul (1934). Das Fürstentum Mentesche. Studien zur Geschichte Westkleinasiens im 13.-15. Jahrhundert (in German). Istanbul: Zaman Kitaphanesi.
- Zachariadou, Elisabeth (1980). "The Turks and the Venetian Territories in Romania (1318-1407)". Πεπραγμένα του Δ' Διεθνούς Κρητολογικού Συνεδρίου, Ηράκλειο, 29 Αυγούστου - 3 Δεκεμβρίου 1976. Τόμος Β′ Βυζαντινοί και μέσοι χρόνοι. Athens: University of Crete. pp. 103–122.
- Zachariadou, Elisabeth A. (1983). Trade and Crusade: Venetian Crete and the Emirates of Menteshe and Aydin (1300-1415). Venice: Istituto Ellenico di Studi Bizantini e Post-bizantini di Venezia. OCLC 144691037.
