= Shepherds' Crusade =

Shepherds' Crusade may refer to:

- Shepherds' Crusade (1251)
- Crusade of the Poor (1309), also called the Shepherds' Crusade
- Shepherds' Crusade (1320)
