= France in the Middle Ages =

The Kingdom of France was a decentralised, feudal monarchy in the Middle Ages (c. 10th–mid-15th century). In Brittany, Normandy, Lorraine, Provence, East Burgundy and Catalonia (the latter now a part of Spain), as well as Aquitaine, the authority of the French king was barely felt. France evolved from the fragmentation of West Francia () to the gradual centralisation of power under the House of Capet (987–1328). This period saw royal struggles with semi-independent principalities like Normandy and Anjou, as well as administrative expansion – especially under Philip II Augustus and Louis IX. The House of Valois (1328–1589) then faced the House of Plantagenet and their Angevin Empire in the Hundred Years' War (1337–1453), a conflict exacerbated by the Black Death (1348). These events fostered a more centralised state and a nascent French identity by the early modern period.

Up to the 12th century, the territory experienced an elaboration and extension of the seigneurial economic system (including the attachment of peasants to the land through serfdom); the extension of the feudal system of political rights and obligations between lords and vassals; the so-called "feudal revolution" of the 11th century, during which ever smaller lords took control of local lands in many regions; and the appropriation by regional/local seigneurs of various administrative, fiscal and judicial rights for themselves. From the 13th century on, the state slowly regained control of a number of these lost powers. The crises of the 13th and 14th centuries led to the convening of an advisory assembly, the Estates General, and an effective end to serfdom. During the 70-year reign of Louis XIV, absolutist policies from Paris tightly constrained the regional nobility, centralising political power at Versailles.

From the 12th and 13th centuries on, France was at the centre of a vibrant cultural production that extended across much of western Europe, including the transition from Romanesque architecture to Gothic architecture and Gothic art; the foundation of medieval universities (such as the universities of Paris (recognised in 1150), Montpellier (1220), Toulouse (1229), and Orleans (1235)) and the so-called "Renaissance of the 12th century"; a growing body of secular vernacular literature (including the chanson de geste, chivalric romance, troubadour and trouvère poetry, etc.) and medieval music (such as the flowering of the Notre Dame school of polyphony).

== Geography ==
From the Middle Ages onward, French rulers believed their kingdoms had natural borders: the Pyrenees, the Alps and the Rhine. This belief was used as a pretext for an aggressive policy and repeated invasions. However, not all of these territories were part of the kingdom, and the authority of the king within his kingdom was quite fluctuant. The lands that composed the Kingdom of France showed great geographical diversity; the northern and central parts enjoyed a temperate climate while the southern part was closer to the Mediterranean climate. While there were great differences between the northern and southern parts of the kingdom, there were equally important differences depending on the distance of mountains: mainly the Alps, the Pyrenees and the Massif Central. France had important rivers that were used as waterways: the Loire, the Rhône, the Seine and the Garonne. These rivers were settled earlier than the rest, and important cities were founded on their banks, but they were separated by large forests, marsh, and other rough terrains.

Before the Romans conquered Gaul, the Gauls lived in villages organised in wider tribes. The Romans referred to the smallest of these groups as pagi and the widest ones as civitates. These pagi and civitates were often taken as a basis for the imperial administration and would survive up to the Middle Ages, when their capitals became centres of bishoprics. These religious provinces would survive until the French Revolution. Southern Gaul was more heavily populated, and therefore more episcopal sees were present there at first while, in northern France, they shrank greatly in size because of the barbarian invasions and became heavily fortified to resist the invaders.

Discussion of the size of France in the Middle Ages is complicated by distinctions between lands personally held by the king (the "domaine royal") and lands held in homage by another lord. The notion of res publica, inherited from the Roman province of Gaul, was not fully maintained by the Frankish kingdom and the Carolingian Empire; by the early years of the Direct Capetians, the French kingdom was more or less a fiction. The "domaine royal" of the Capetians was limited to the regions around Paris, Bourges and Sens. The great majority of French territory was part of Aquitaine, the Duchy of Normandy, the Duchy of Brittany, the Comté of Champagne, the Duchy of Burgundy, the County of Flanders and other territories. In principle, the lords of these lands owed homage to the French king for their possession, but in reality, the king in Paris had little control over these lands, and this was confounded by the uniting of Normandy, Aquitaine and England under the Plantagenet dynasty in the 12th century.

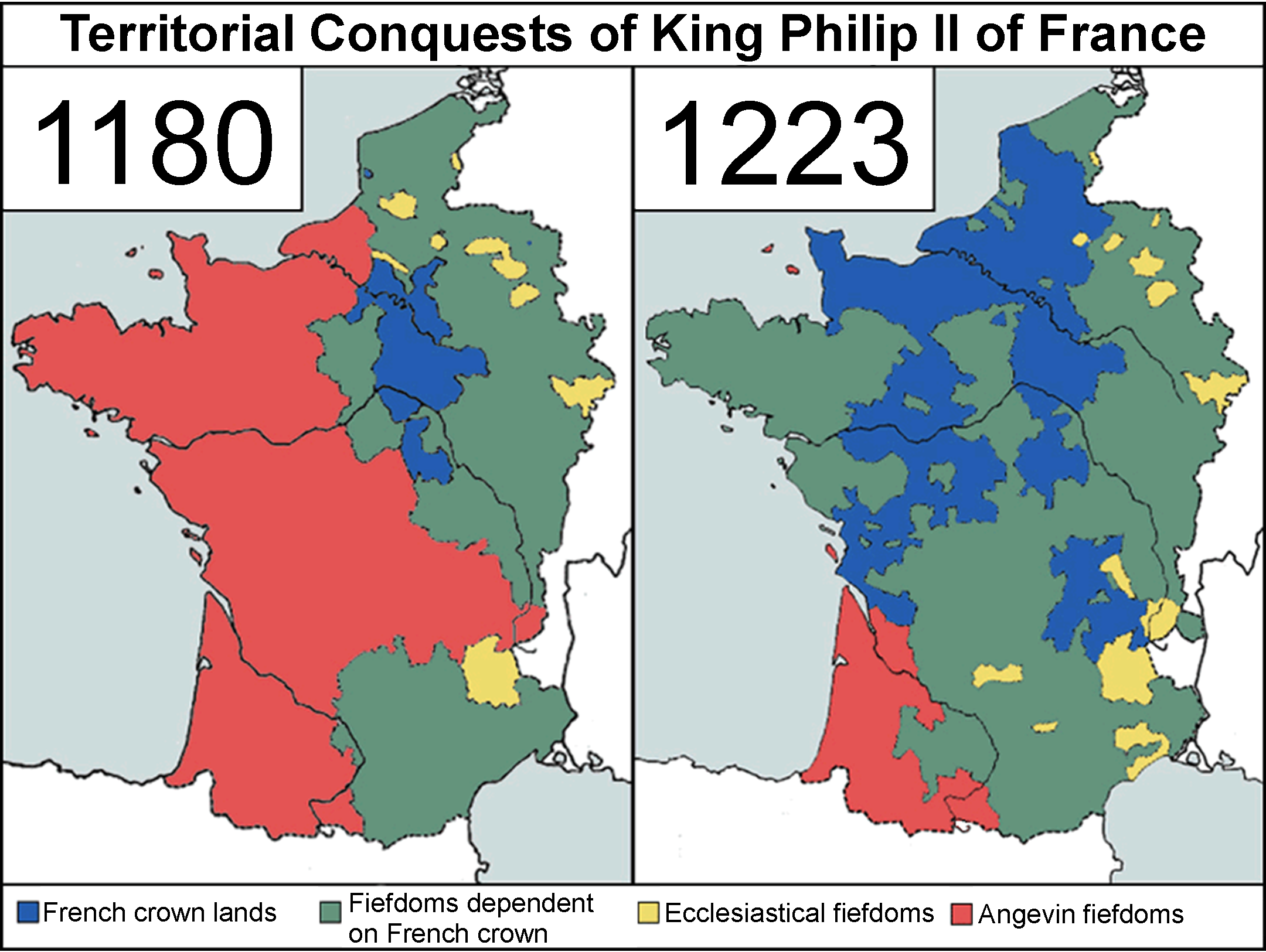
The territorial conquests of Philip Augustus of France, at the time of his accession (1180) and at the time of his death (1223).

Philip II Augustus undertook a massive expansion in the 13th century, but most of these acquisitions were lost both by the royal system of "apanage" (the giving of regions to members of the royal family to be administered) and losses in the Hundred Years' War. Only in the 15th century would Charles VII and Louis XI gain control of most of modern-day France (except for Brittany, Navarre, and parts of eastern and northern France).

== Demography ==
The weather in France and Europe in the Middle Ages was significantly milder than during the periods preceding or following it. Historians refer to this as the "Medieval Warm Period", lasting from about the 10th century to about the 14th century. Part of the French population growth in this period is directly linked to this temperate weather and its effect on crops and livestock. The vast majority of the population—between 80 and 90 percent—were peasants.

In the early Middle Ages, France was a center of Jewish learning, but increasing persecution and a series of expulsions in the 14th century caused considerable suffering for French Jews. At the end of the Middle Ages, France was the most populous region in Europe—having overtaken Spain and Italy by 1340. In the 14th century, prior to the arrival of the Black Death, France had an estimated 16 to 17 million inhabitants within its historical borders, while the total population of the area covered by modern-day France has been estimated at 20 million. The population of Paris is controversial. Josiah Russell estimates about 80,000 in the early 14th century, although he notes that some other scholars suggest 200,000. The higher count would make it by far the largest city in western Europe; the lower count would put it behind Venice with 100,000 and Florence with 96,000. The Black Death killed an estimated one-third of the population after its appearance in 1348. The concurrent Hundred Years' War slowed recovery. By the mid-16th century the population had recovered to mid-14th century levels.

== Languages and literacy ==
Medieval Latin was the primary medium of scholarly exchange as well as the liturgical language of the Catholic Church; it was also the language of science, literature, law, and administration. From the 13th century on, vernacular languages were used in administrative work and the law courts, but Latin remained the administrative and legal language until the Ordinance of Villers-Cotterêts (1539) prescribed the use of French in all judicial acts, notarized contracts, and official legislation. The vast majority of the population, however, spoke a variety of vernacular languages derived from vulgar Latin, the common spoken language of the Western Roman Empire.

The medieval Italian poet Dante, in his Latin De vulgari eloquentia, classified the Romance languages into three groups based on their respective words for "yes": Nam alii oc, alii si, alii vero dicunt oil ("For some say oc, others say si, others say oïl"). The oïl languages – from Latin hoc ille, "that is it" – were spoken primarily in northern France, the oc languages – from Latin hoc, "that" – in southern France, and the si languages – from Latin sic, "thus" – on the Italian and Iberian Peninsula. Modern linguists typically add a third group within France around Lyon, the "Arpitan" or "Franco-Provençal language", whose modern word for "yes" is ouè. The langue d'oc, consisting of the languages which use oc or òc for "yes", was the language group spoken in the south of France and northeastern Spain. These languages, such as Gascon and Provençal, have relatively little Frankish influence.

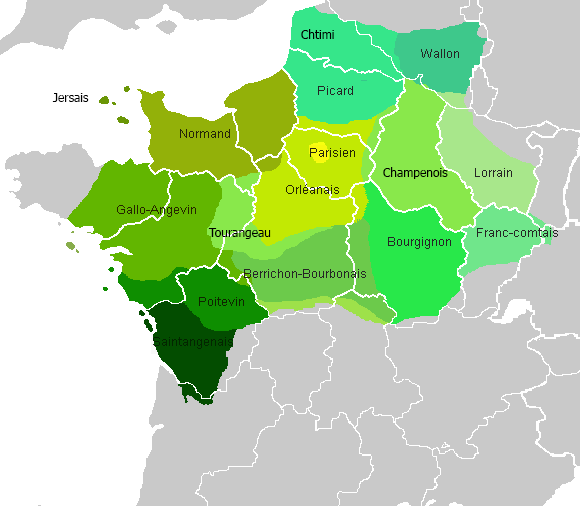
The area of langues d'oïl

The Gallo-Romance group in the north of France, consisting of langues d'oïl such as Picard, Walloon, and Francien, were influenced by Germanic languages spoken by the earliest Frankish invaders. From the time of Clovis I on, the Franks expanded their rule over northern Gaul. Over time, the French language developed from either the Oïl languages found around Paris and Île-de-France (the Francien theory) or from a standard administrative language based on common characteristics found in all Oïl languages (the lingua franca theory).

From the 4th to 7th centuries, Brythonic-speaking peoples from Cornwall, Devon, and Wales travelled across the English Channel, both for reasons of trade and of flight from the Anglo-Saxon invasions of England, and established themselves in Armorica in northwest France. Their dialect evolved into the Breton language, and they gave their name to the peninsula they inhabited: Brittany.

Attested since the time of Julius Caesar, a non-Celtic people who spoke a Basque-related language inhabited the Novempopulania (Aquitania Tertia) in southwestern France, though the language gradually lost ground to the expanding Romance during a period spanning most of the Early Middle Ages. This Proto-Basque influenced the emerging Latin-based language spoken in the area between the Garonne and the Pyrenees, eventually resulting in the dialect of Occitan called Gascon.

Scandinavian Vikings invaded France from the 9th century onwards and established themselves mostly in what would come to be called Normandy. The Normans took up the langue d'oïl spoken there, although Norman French remained heavily influenced by Old Norse and its dialects. They also contributed many words related to sailing and farming to the French language. After the Norman Conquest of England in 1066, the Normans' language developed into Anglo-Norman. Anglo-Norman served as the language of the ruling classes and commerce in England from the time of the conquest until the Hundred Years' War, by which time the use of French-influenced English had spread throughout English society.

Also around this time period, many words from the Arabic language entered French, mainly indirectly through Medieval Latin, Italian and Spanish. These include words for luxury goods (élixir, orange), spices (camphre, safran), trade goods (alcool, bougie, coton), sciences (alchimie, hasard), and mathematics (algèbre, algorithme).

While education and literacy had been important components of aristocratic service in the Carolingian period, by the 11th century and continuing into the 13th century, the lay (secular) public in France—both nobles and peasants—was largely illiterate, except for (at least to the end of the 12th century) members of the great courts and, in the south, smaller noble families. This situation began to change in the 13th century, where there were literate members of the French nobility like Guillaume de Lorris, Geoffrey of Villehardouin (sometimes referred to as Villehardouin), and Jean de Joinville (sometimes referred to as Joinville). Similarly, with the outpouring of French vernacular literature from the 12th century on (chanson de geste, chivalric romance, troubadour and trouvère poetry, etc.), French eventually became the "international language of the aristocracy".

== Society and government ==
=== Peasants ===
Traditional categories inherited from the Roman and Merovingian period (distinctions between free and unfree peasants, between tenants and peasants who owned their own land, etc.) underwent significant changes up to the 11th century. The traditional rights of "free" peasants—such as service in royal armies (they had been able to serve in the royal armies as late as Charlemagne's reign) and participation in public assemblies and law courts—were lost through the 9th to the 10th centuries, and they were increasingly made dependents of nobles, churches and large landholders. From the mid-8th century to the 11th century, there was a steady increase of aristocratic and monastic control of the land, at the expense of landowning peasants. At the same time, the traditional notion of "unfree" dependents, and the distinction between "unfree" and "free" tenants, was eroded as the concept of serfdom came to dominate.

From the mid-8th century on, particularly in the north, the relationship between peasants and the land became increasingly characterized by the extension of the "bipartite estate" system (manorialism), in which peasants (who were bound to the land) held tenant holdings from a lord or monastery (for which they paid rent), but were also required to work the lord's own "demesne"; in the north, some of these estates could be quite substantial. This system remained a standard part of lord-tenant relations into the 12th century.

The economic and demographic crises of the 14th–15th centuries (agricultural expansion had lost many of the gains made in the 12th and 13th centuries) reversed this trend: landlords offered serfs their freedom in exchange for working abandoned lands, ecclesiastical and royal authorities created new "free" cities (villefranches) or granted freedom to existing cities, etc. By the end of the 15th century, serfdom was largely extinct; henceforth "free" peasants paid rents for their own lands, and the lord's demesne was worked by hired labor. This liberated the peasantry to a certain degree, but also made their lives more precarious in times of economic uncertainty. For lords who rented out more and more of their holdings for fixed rents, the initial benefits were positive, but over time they found themselves increasingly cash-strapped as inflationary pressures reduced their incomes.

=== Cities and towns ===
Much of the Gallo-Roman urban network of cities survived (albeit much changed) into the Middle Ages as regional centers and capitals: certain cities had been chosen as centers of bishoprics by the church (such as Paris, Reims, Aix, Tours, Carcassonne and Narbonne, Auch, Albi, Bourges and Lyon), others as seats of local (county, duchy) administrative power (such as Angers, Blois, Poitiers and Toulouse). In many cases (such as with Poitiers) cities were seats of both episcopal and administrative power.

From the 10th to the 11th centuries, the urban development of the country expanded, particularly on the northern coasts: new ports appeared, and dukes and counts encouraged and created new towns. In other areas, urban growth was slower and centered on the monastic houses. In many regions, market towns (burgs) with limited privileges were established by local lords. In the late 11th century, "communes", governing assemblies, began to develop in towns. Starting sporadically in the late 10th, and increasingly in the 12th century, many towns and villages were able to gain economic, social or judicial privileges and franchises from their lords (exemptions from tolls and dues, rights to clear land or hold fairs, some judicial or administrative independence, etc.). The seigneurial reaction to expanding urbanism and enfranchisement was mixed; some lords fought against the changes, but some lords gained financial and political advantages from the communal movement and growing trade.

The 13th to 14th centuries were a period of significant urbanization. Paris was the largest city in the realm, and indeed one of the largest cities in Europe. The second-largest city was Rouen; the other major cities (with populations over 10,000) were Orléans, Tours, Bordeaux, Lyon, Dijon, and Reims. In addition to these, there also existed zones with an extended urban network of medium to small cities, as in the south and the Mediterranean coast (from Toulouse to Marseille, including Narbonne and Montpellier) and in the north (Beauvais, Laon, Amiens, Arras, Bruges, etc.). Market towns increased in size, and many were able to gain privileges and franchises including transformation into free cities (villes franches); rural populations from the countrysides moved to the cities and burgs. This was also a period of urban building: the extension of walls around the entirety of the urban space, the vast construction of Gothic cathedrals (starting in the 12th century), urban fortresses, castles (such as Philip II Augustus' Louvre around 1200) and bridges.

=== Aristocracy, nobles, knights ===
In the Carolingian period, the "aristocracy" (nobilis in the Latin documents) was not a legally defined category. With traditions going back to the Romans; a "noble" possessed significant land holdings, had access to the king and royal court, could receive honores and benefices for service (such as being named count or duke). Their access to political power in the Carolingian period might also necessitate a need for education. Their wealth and power was also evident in their lifestyle and purchase of luxury goods, and in their maintenance of an armed entourage of fideles (men who had sworn oaths to serve them).

From the late 9th to the late 10th century, the nature of the noble class changed significantly. The aristocracy increasingly focused on establishing strong regional bases of landholdings, on taking hereditary control of the counties and duchies, and eventually on erecting these into veritable independent principalities and privatizing various privileges and rights of the state. (By 1025, the area north of the Loire was dominated by six or seven of these virtually independent states.) After 1000, these counties in turn began to break down into smaller lordships, as smaller lords wrest control of local lands in the so-called "feudal revolution" and seized control over many elements of comital powers. Secondly, from the 9th century on, military ability was increasingly seen as conferring special status, and professional soldiers or milites, generally in the entourage of sworn lords, began to establish themselves in the ranks of the aristocracy (acquiring local lands, building private castles, seizing elements of justice), thereby transforming into the military noble class historians refer to as "knights".

==== Vassalage and feudal land ====
The Merovingians and Carolingians maintained relations of power with their aristocracy through the use of clientele systems and the granting of honores and benefices, including land, a practice which grew out of Late Antiquity. This practice would develop into the system of vassalage and feudalism in the Middle Ages. Originally, vassalage did not imply the giving or receiving of landholdings (which were granted only as a reward for loyalty), but by the eighth century the giving of a landholding was becoming standard. The granting of a landholding to a vassal did not relinquish the lord's property rights, but only the use of the lands and their income; the granting lord retained ultimate ownership of the fee and could, technically, recover the lands in case of disloyalty or death.

In the 8th-century Frankish empire, Charles Martel was the first to make large scale and systematic use (the practice had remained until then sporadic) of the remuneration of vassals by the concession of the usufruct of lands (a beneficatium or "benefice" in the documents) for the lifetime of the vassal, or, sometimes extending to the second or third generation. By the middle of the 10th century, feudal land grants (fee, fiefs) had largely become hereditary. The eldest son of a deceased vassal would inherit, but first he had to do homage and fealty to the lord and pay a "relief" for the land (a monetary recognition of the lord's continuing proprietary rights over the property). By the 11th century, the bonds of vassalage and the granting of fiefs had spread throughout much of French society, but it was in no ways universal in France: in the south, feudal grants of land or of rights were unknown.

In its origin, the feudal grant had been seen in terms of a personal bond between lord and vassal, but with time and the transformation of fiefs into hereditary holdings, the nature of the system came to be seen as a form of "politics of land" (an expression used by historian Marc Bloch). The 11th century in France saw what has been called by historians a "feudal revolution" or "mutation" and a "fragmentation of powers" (Bloch) that was unlike the development of feudalism in England or Italy or Germany in the same period or later: counties and duchies began to break down into smaller holdings as castellans and lesser seigneurs took control of local lands, and (as comital families had done before them) lesser lords usurped/privatized a wide range of prerogatives and rights of the state, most importantly the highly profitable rights of justice, but also travel dues, market dues, fees for using woodlands, obligations to use the lord's mill, etc. (what Georges Duby calls collectively the "seigneurie banale"). Power in this period became more personal and it would take centuries for the state to fully reimpose its control over local justice and fiscal administration (by the 15th century, much of the seigneur's legal purview had been given to the bailliages, leaving them only affairs concerning seigneurial dues and duties, and small affairs of local justice).

This "fragmentation of powers" was not however systematic throughout France, and in certain counties (such as Flanders, Normandy, Anjou, Toulouse), counts were able to maintain control of their lands into the 12th century or later. Thus, in some regions (like Normandy and Flanders), the vassal/feudal system was an effective tool for ducal and comital control, linking vassals to their lords; but in other regions, the system led to significant confusion, all the more so as vassals could and frequently did pledge themselves to two or more lords. In response to this, the idea of a "liege lord" was developed (where the obligations to one lord are regarded as superior) in the 12th century.

==== Peerage ====
Medieval French kings conferred the dignity of peerage upon certain of his preëminent vassals, both clerical and lay. Some historians consider Louis VII to have created the French system of peers. Peerage was attached to a specific territorial jurisdiction, either an episcopal see for episcopal peerages or a fief for secular. Peerages attached to fiefs were transmissible or inheritable with the fief, and these fiefs are often designated as pairie-duché (for duchies) and pairie-comté (for counties).

By 1228 there were 12 peers:

- Archbishop of Reims, who had the distinction of anointing and crowning the king
- Bishop of Langres
- Bishop of Beauvais
- Bishop of Châlons
- Bishop of Noyon
- Duke of Normandy
- Duke of Burgundy
- Duke of Aquitaine, also called Duke of Guyenne
- Count of Champagne
- Bishop of Laon
- Count of Flanders
- Count of Toulouse

These twelve peerages are known as the ancient peerage or pairie ancienne, and the number 12 is sometimes said to have been chosen to mirror the 12 paladins of Charlemagne in the Chanson de geste (see below). Parallels may also be seen with mythical Knights of the Round Table under King Arthur. So popular was this notion that for a long time people thought peerage had originated in the reign of Charlemagne, who was considered the model king and shining example for knighthood and nobility. The dozen pairs played a role in the royal sacre or consecration, during the liturgy of the coronation of the king, attested to as early as 1179, symbolically upholding his crown, and each original peer had a specific role, often with an attribute. Since the peers were never twelve during the coronation in early periods, due to the fact that most lay peerages were forfeited to or merged in the crown, delegates were chosen by the king, mainly from the princes of the blood. In later periods peers also held up by poles a baldaquin or cloth of honour over the king during much of the ceremony.

In 1204 the Duchy of Normandy was absorbed by the French crown, and later in the 13th century two more of the lay peerages were absorbed by the crown (Toulouse 1271, Champagne 1284), so in 1297 three new peerages were created, the County of Artois, the Duchy of Anjou and the Duchy of Brittany, to compensate for the three peerages that had disappeared. Thus, beginning in 1297 the practice started of creating new peerages by letters patent, specifying the fief to which the peerage was attached, and the conditions under which the fief could be transmitted (e.g. only male heirs) for princes of the blood who held an apanage. By 1328, all apanagistes would be peers. The number of lay peerages increased over time to 26 in 1400, 21 in 1505, and 24 in 1588.

=== Monarchy and regional powers ===
France was a very decentralised state during the Middle Ages. Lorraine and Provence were states of the Holy Roman Empire and not a part of France. North of the Loire, the king of France at times fought or allied with one of the great principalities of Normandy, Anjou, Blois-Champagne, Flanders and Burgundy. The duke of Normandy was overlord of the duke of Brittany. South of the Loire were the principalities of Aquitaine, Toulouse and Barcelona. Normandy became the strongest power in the north, while Barcelona became the strongest in the south. The rulers of both fiefs eventually became kings, the former by the conquest of England, and the latter by the succession to Aragon. French suzerainty over Barcelona was formally relinquished by King Louis IX in 1258.

Initially, West Francia kings were elected by the secular and ecclesiastic magnates, but the regular coronation of the eldest son of the reigning king during his father's lifetime established the principle of male primogeniture, later popularized as the Salic law. The authority of the king was more religious than administrative. The 11th century marked the apogee of princely power at the expense of the king when states like Normandy, Flanders or Languedoc enjoyed a local authority comparable to kingdoms in all but name. The Capetians, as they were descended from the Robertians, were formerly powerful princes who had successfully unseated the weak Carolingian kings. The Carolingian kings had nothing more than a royal title when the Capetian kings added their principality to that title. The Capetians, in a way, held a dual status of king and prince; as king they held the Crown of Charlemagne, and as Count of Paris they held their personal fiefdom, best known as Île-de-France.

The fact that the Capetians both held lands as prince as well as in the title of king gave them a complicated status. Thus they were involved in the struggle for power within France as princes, but they also had a religious authority over Roman Catholicism in France as king. However, and despite the fact that the Capetian kings often treated other princes more as enemies and allies than as subordinates, their royal title was often recognised yet not often respected. The royal authority was so weak in some remote places that bandits were the effective power.

The election of Hugh Capet triggered the southern principalities to pursue greater autonomy, which they had previously refrained out of loyalty to the Carolingians. These princes—many still Carolingian loyalists— began to put themselves on equal footing with the Capetian king and to downplay the king's authority. Almost all medieval texts from the southern lands define "France" and "French" as the area north of the Loire, even when the southerners acknowledged that they were subjects of the king of France. Gascons and Celtic Bretons in particular perceived French as foreign, and other French also regarded them as foreign.

Some of the king's vassals grew sufficiently powerful that they became some of the strongest rulers of western Europe. The Normans, the Plantagenets, the Lusignans, the Hautevilles, the Ramnulfids, and the House of Toulouse successfully carved lands outside France for themselves. The most important of these conquests for French history was the Norman Conquest by William the Conqueror, following the Battle of Hastings and immortalised in the Bayeux Tapestry, because it linked England to France through Normandy. Although the Normans became both vassals of the French kings and their equals as kings of England, their zone of political activity remained centered in France.

Much of the French aristocracy was involved in the crusades, and French knights founded and ruled the Crusader states. An example of the legacy left in the Middle East by these nobles is the Krak des Chevaliers' enlargement by the counts of Tripoli and Toulouse.

The history of the monarchy is how it overcame the powerful barons over ensuing centuries and established absolute sovereignty over France in the 16th century. A number of factors contributed to the rise of the French monarchy. The dynasty established by Hugh Capet continued uninterrupted until 1328, and the laws of primogeniture ensured orderly successions of power. The successors of Capet came to be recognised as members of an illustrious and ancient royal house and therefore socially superior to their politically and economically superior rivals. The Capetians had the support of the Church, which favoured a strong central government in France. This alliance with the Church was one of the great enduring legacies of the Capetians. The First Crusade was composed almost entirely of Frankish princes. As time went on the power of the king was expanded by conquests, seizures and successful feudal political battles.

==== Foreign acquisitions ====
Vassals and cadets of the king of France made several foreign acquisitions during the Middle Ages:

- William the Conqueror, Duke of Normandy (1066): conquered the Kingdom of England
- The success of the First Crusade led to the creation of a Frankish kingdom in the Levant in 1099
- Norman knights settled in Sicily, which was raised to a kingdom in 1130
- Fulk V, Count of Anjou (1131): became king of Jerusalem by marriage
- Afonso I of Portugal (1139): great-grandson of Robert I, Duke of Burgundy and founder of the Kingdom of Portugal
- Henry II of England (1154): ruled England and much of western France (The Angevin Empire)
- Alfonso II of Aragon, Count of Barcelona (1164): first count of Barcelona to become king of Aragon in his own right
- Theobald I of Navarre, Count of Champagne (1234): inherited the Kingdom of Navarre from his uncle
- Charles I of Naples, Count of Anjou (1266): youngest son of Louis VIII of France, conquered the Kingdom of Naples and Sicily, proclaimed himself king of Albania
- Charles I of Hungary (1301): scion of the Capetian House of Anjou, King of Hungary and Croatia
- Henry VII, Holy Roman Emperor: became a vassal of Philip IV of France while Count of Luxembourg. Philip IV advanced the candidacy of his brother Charles of Valois for the imperial throne, but the German electors were unwilling to expand French influence even further. Henry was elected King of Germany in 1308 as a compromise candidate, and became emperor in 1312.
- John of Bohemia (1310): son of Emperor Henry VII, he became of King of Bohemia by marriage. John was raised in Paris, and died fighting for the French in the Battle of Crécy
- Philip III of Navarre, Count of Évreux (1328): became King of Navarre by marriage
- Louis I of Hungary (1342): son of Charles I of Hungary, eventually became King of Poland in addition to the realms inherited from his father
- Charles IV, Holy Roman Emperor (1346): son of John of Bohemia, he received French education and resided in the French court for seven years. His close connection to the House of France facilitated the sale of Dauphiné, an imperial fief, in 1349, and its eventual transfer into the French crown.
- Philip the Bold, Duke of Burgundy (1363): with his appanage of Burgundy and his marriage to the heiress of Flanders, he founded the House of Valois-Burgundy, the most powerful dynasty of the Middle Ages which is not of royal rank

The power of the French monarchy grew at a slower rate at the beginning. The early Capetians ruled much longer than their contemporaries but had little power. They did not have the will or the resources to coerce their vassals into obedience. Louis VI began an aggressive policy of demanding obedience from his vassals in the Ile-de-France backed by military force. Louis VII's marriage to Eleanor of Aquitaine brought the French monarchy's influence to southern France, but the annulment of their marriage brought about the rise of the Angevin dynasty, the most formidable rival of the French monarchy. Philip II made the French king the foremost power within his own kingdom, destroying Angevin power in France through the conquest of Normandy and Anjou.

Louis VIII embarked on the Albigensian Crusade, which brought northern France to war against the south. Louis IX brought the prestige of the French monarchy at its height. Even the Mongol leader Hulagu, who had been under the impression that the pope was the ruler of all Christians, realized that the true power rested in the king of France and sought an alliance with him.

Philip III inherited Toulouse and married his son to the heiress of Navarre and Champagne; Philip IV was the most absolutist of the medieval French kings, but his costly policies brought him into conflict with the pope and the persecution of the Templars in order to obtain their resources. The orderly succession of French kings for more than 300 years, combined with an abrupt dynastic crisis in 1316 led to the adoption of a succession law that prevented the kingship from going out of the Capetian dynasty. The successive deaths of the sons of Philip IV in a short period of time led to the rise of the House of Valois. Philip VI was an initially promising ruler, having brought Flanders into submission early in his reign. At the outbreak of the Hundred Years' War, France was the foremost power in Western Europe, but this did not prevent his overwhelming defeat at Crécy.

John II brought the French monarchy at its lowest with another overwhelming defeat in Poitiers. Charles V recovered most of the territories lost during the war. The madness of Charles VI multiplied the woes of France, as the princes of the royal house split into factions in order to obtain power. France suffered another defeat at Agincourt, and the king was forced to disinherit his own son in favor of Henry V of England. Charles VII was apathetic during the early years of his reign, but his fortunes changed with the rise of Joan of Arc in 1429 and his reconciliation with the duke of Burgundy in 1435. The French were victorious at the end of the war in 1453, and the King of France was once again the most powerful monarch in Europe, with the first standing army since Roman times.

=== Royal administration ===
==== King's Council ====
The kings of France traditionally always sought the advice of their entourage (vassals, clerics, etc.) before making important decisions. In the early Middle Ages, the entourage around the king was sometimes called the familia; later the expression "hôtel du roi" or the "maison du roi" (the "royal household") was used for people attached directly to the person of the king, while (in the 12th century), those who were called upon to counsel the king in his administration of the realm took the form of a specific (and separate) institution called the King's Court (Latin: the "Curia Regis", later the Conseil du Roi)), although by the middle of the 13th century distinctions between "hôtel du roi" and curia regis were less clear.

In addition to the King's Council, the consultative governing of the country also depended on other intermittent and permanent institutions, such as the States General, the Parlements and the Provincial Estates. The Parliament of Paris – as indeed all of the sovereign courts of the realm – was itself born out of the King's Council: originally a consultative body of the Curia Regis, later (in the thirteenth century) endowed with judicial functions, the Parliament was separated from the King's Council in 1254.

The King's Court functioned as an advisory body under the early Capetian kings. It was composed of a number of the king's trusted advisers but only a few traveled with the king at any time. By the later twelfth century it had become a judicial body with a few branching off to remain the king's council. By the fourteenth century the term curia regis was no longer used. However, it had served as a predecessor to later sovereign assemblies; the Parlement which was a judiciary body, the Chamber of Accounts which was a financial body and King's Council.

The composition of the King's Council changed constantly over the centuries and according to the needs and desires of the king. Medieval councils frequently excluded:

- the queen (both as queen consort or as queen mother) – the influence of the queen lost direct political control as early as the 13th century, except in periods of regency; the queen thus only exceptionally attended the Council.
- close relations to the king, including younger sons, grandsons and princes of the royal bloodline ("prince du sang") from junior branches of the family – these individuals were often suspected of political ambition and of plotting.

On the other hand, medieval councils generally included:

- the crown prince (the "dauphin") – if he was of age to attend the council
- the "grands" – the most powerful members of the church and of the nobility.

The feudal aristocracy would maintain great control over the king's council up until the 14th and 15th centuries. The most important positions in the court were those of the Great Officers of the Crown of France, headed by the connétable (chief military officer of the realm; established by King Philip I in 1060) and the chancellor. Other positions included the Grand Chambrier who managed the Royal Treasury along with the Grand Bouteiller (Grand Butler), before being supplanted of these functions by the Chamber of Accounts (Chambre des comptes, created by King Philip IV) and the position of Surintendant des finances (created in 1311). Certain kings were unable to reduce the importance of the feudal aristocracy (Louis X, Philip VI, John II, Charles VI), while others were more successful (Charles V, Louis XI).

Over the centuries, the number of jurists (or "légistes"), generally educated by the université de Paris, steadily increased as the technical aspects of the matters studied in the council mandated specialized counsellers. Coming from the lesser nobility or the bourgeoisie, these jurists (whose positions sometimes gave them or their heirs nobility, as the so-called "noblesse de robe" or chancellor nobles) helped in preparing and putting into legal form the king's decisions, and they formed the early elements of a true civil service and royal administration which would – because of their permanence – provide a sense of stability and continuity to the royal council, despite its many reorganizations. In their attempts at greater efficiency, the kings tried to reduce the number of counsellors or to convoke "reduced councils". Charles V had a council of 12 members.

The Council had only a consultational role: the final decision was always the king's. Although jurists frequented praised (especially later in the 16th century) the advantages of consultative government (with the agreement of his counsellors, the king could more easily impose the most severe of his decisions, or he could have his most unpopular decisions blamed on his counsellors), mainstream legal opinion never held that the king was bound by the decisions of his council; the opposite was however put forward by the States General of 1355–1358.

The Council's purview concerned all matters pertaining to government and royal administration, both in times of war and of peace. In his council, the king received ambassadors, signed treaties, appointed administrators and gave them instructions (called, from the 12th century on, mandements), elaborated on the laws of the realm (called ordonnances). The council also served as a supreme court and rendered royal justice on those matters that the king reserved for himself (so-called "justice retenue") or decided to discuss personally.

Council meetings, initially irregular, took on a regular schedule which became daily from the middle of the 15th century.

==== Royal finances ====
The king was expected to survive on the revenues of the "domaine royal", or lands that belonged to him directly. In times of need, the taille, an "exceptional" tax could be imposed and collected; this resource was increasingly required during the protracted wars of the 14th–15th centuries and the taille became permanent in 1439, when the right to collect taxes in support of a standing army was granted to Charles VII of France during the Hundred Years' War.

To oversee the Kingdom's revenues and expenditure, the French King first relied solely on the Curia Regis. However, by the mid-12th century, the Crown entrusted its finances to the Knights Templar, who maintained a banking establishment in Paris. The royal Treasury was henceforth organized like a bank and salaries and revenues were transferred between accounts. Royal accounting officers in the field, who sent revenues to the Temple, were audited by the King's Court, which had special clerks assigned to work at the Temple. These financial specialists came to be called the Curia in Compotis and sat in special sessions of the King's Court for dealing with financial business. From 1297, accounts were audited twice yearly after Midsummer Day (24 June) and Christmas. In time, what was once a simple Exchequer of Receipts developed into a central auditing agency, branched off, and eventually specialized into a full-time court.

In 1256, Saint Louis issued a decree ordering all mayors, burgesses, and town councilmen to appear before the King's sovereign auditors of the Exchequer (French gens des comptes) in Paris to render their final accounts. The King's Court's general secretariat had members who specialized in finance and accountancy and could receive accounts. A number of maîtres lais were commissioned to sit as the King's Exchequer (comptes du Roi).

In or around 1303, the Paris Court of Accounts was established in the Palais de la Cité. Its auditors were responsible for overseeing revenue from Crown estates and checking public spending. It audited the royal household, inspectors, royal commissioners, provosts, baillifs, and seneschals. In 1307, the Philip IV definitively removed royal funds from the Temple and placed them in the fortress of the Louvre. Thereafter, the financial specialists received accounts for audit in a room of the royal palace that became known as the Camera compotorum or Chambre des comptes, and they began to be collectively identified under the same name, although still only a subcommission of the King's Court, consisting of about sixteen people.

The Vivier-en-Brie Ordinance of 1320, issued by Philip V, required the Chambre to audit accounts, judge cases arising from accountability, and maintain registers of financial documents; it also laid out the basic composition of financial courts: three (later four) cleric masters of accounts (maîtres-clercs) to act as chief auditors and three maîtres-lais familiers du Roi empowered to hear and adjudge ("oyer and terminer") audit accounts. They were assisted by eleven clerks (petis clercs, later clercs des comptes) who acted as auditors of the prests. This complement grew by 50 percent in the next two decades but was reduced to seven masters and twelve clerks in 1346. The office of président was created by the Ordinance of 1381, and a second lay Chief Baron was appointed in 1400. Clerks of court were eventually added to the court's composition. Examiners (correcteurs) were created to assist the maitres. Other court officers (conseillers) appointed by the King were created to act alongside the maîtres ordinaires. Lastly, the Ordinance of 26 February 1464 named the Court of Accounts as the "sovereign, primary, supreme, and sole court of last resort in all things financial".

While gaining in stability in the later 14th century, the court lost its central role in royal finances. First, currency was moved to a separate body (Chambre des monnaies), then the increasingly regular "extraordinary" taxes (aide, tallage, gabelle) became the responsibility of the généraux of the Cour des aides (created in 1390). The Crown's domainal revenues, still retained by the Court of Accounts, fell in importance and value. By 1400, the Court's role had been much reduced. However, with the gradual enlargement of the realm through conquest, the need for the court remained secure.

==== Parlements ====
The Parliament of Paris, born out of the king's council in 1307, and sitting inside the medieval royal palace on the Île de la Cité, still the site of the Paris Hall of Justice. The jurisdiction of the Parliament of Paris covered the entire kingdom as it was in the fourteenth century, but did not automatically advance in step with the enlarging personal dominions of the kings. In 1443, following the turmoil of the Hundred Years' War, King Charles VII of France granted Languedoc its own parlement by establishing the Parlement of Toulouse, the first parlement outside of Paris; its jurisdiction extended over most of southern France.

Several other parlements were created in various provinces of France in the Middle Ages: Dauphiné (Grenoble 1453), Guyenne and Gascony (Bordeaux 1462), Burgundy (Dijon 1477), Normandy (Rouen 1499/1515). All of them were administrative capitals of regions with strong historical traditions of independence before they were incorporated into France.

==== Estates General ====
In 1302, expanding French royal power led to a general assembly consisting of the chief lords, both lay and ecclesiastical, and the representatives of the principal privileged towns, which were like distinct lordships. Certain precedents paved the way for this institution: representatives of principal towns had several times been convoked by the king, and under Philip III there had been assemblies of nobles and ecclesiastics in which the two orders deliberated separately. It was the dispute between Philip the Fair and Pope Boniface VIII which led to the States-General of 1302; the king of France desired that, in addition to the Great Officers of the Crown of France, he receive the counsel from the three estates in this serious crisis. The letters summoning the assembly of 1302 are published by M. Georges Picot in his collection of Documents inédits pour servir à l'histoire de France. During the same reign they were subsequently assembled several times to give him aid by granting subsidies. Over time subsidies came to be the most frequent motive for their convocation.

The Estates-General included representatives of the First Estate (clergy), Second Estate (the nobility), and Third Estate (commoners: all others), and monarchs always summoned them either to grant subsidies or to advise the Crown, to give aid and counsel. In their primitive form in the 14th and the first half of the 15th centuries, the Estates-General had only a limited elective element. The lay lords and the ecclesiastical lords (bishops and other high clergy) who made up the Estates-General were not elected by their peers, but directly chosen and summoned by the king. In the order of the clergy, however, since certain ecclesiastical bodies, e.g. abbeys and chapters of cathedrals, were also summoned to the assembly, and as these bodies, being persons in the moral but not in the physical sense, could not appear in person, their representative had to be chosen by the monks of the convent or the canons of the chapter. It was only the representation of the Third Estate which was furnished by election. Originally, moreover, the latter was not called upon as a whole to seek representation in the estates. It was only the bonnes villes, the privileged towns, which were called upon. They were represented by elected procureurs, who were frequently the municipal officials of the town, but deputies were often elected for the purpose. The country districts, the plat pays, were not represented. Even within the bonnes villes, the franchise was quite narrow.

==== Prévôts, baillages ====
The prévôts were the first-level judges created by the Capetian monarchy around the 11th century who administered the scattered parts of the royal domain. Provosts replaced viscounts wherever a viscounty had not been made a fief, and it is likely that the provost position imitated and was styled after the corresponding ecclesiastical provost of cathedral chapters. Provosts were entrusted with and carried out local royal power, including the collection of the Crown's domainal revenues and all taxes and duties owed the King within a provostship's jurisdiction. They were also responsible for military defense such as raising local contingents for royal armies. The provosts also administered justice though with limited jurisdiction.

In the 11th century, the provosts tended increasingly to make their positions hereditary and thus became more difficult to control. One of the King's great officers, the Great Seneschal, became their supervisor. In the 12th century, the office of provost was put up for bidding, and thereafter provosts were farmers of revenues. The provost thus received the speculative right to collect the King's seignorial revenues within his provostship. This remained his primary role.

To monitor the performance and curtail abuses of the prévôts or their equivalent (in Normandy a vicomte, in parts of northern France a châtelain, in the south a viguier or a bayle), Philip II Augustus, an able and ingenious administrator who founded many of the central institutions on which the French monarchy's system of power would be based, established itinerant justices known as baillis ("bailiff") based on medieval fiscal and tax divisions which had been used by earlier sovereign princes (such as the Duke of Normandy). The bailli was thus the king's administrative representative in northern France responsible for the application of justice and control of the administration and local finances in his baillage (in the south of France, the equivalent post was "sénéchal, sénéchaussé").

Over time, the role of the baillages would be greatly extended as extensions of royal power, administration and justice. With the office of Great Seneschal vacant after 1191, the bailies became stationary and established themselves as powerful officials superior to provosts. A bailie's district included about half a dozen provostships. When appeals were instituted by the Crown, appeal of provost judgments, formerly impossible, now lay with the bailie. Moreover, in the 14th century, provosts no longer were in charge of collecting domainal revenues, except in farmed provostships, having instead yielded this responsibility to royal receivers (receveurs royaux). Raising local army contingents (ban and arrière-ban) also passed to bailies. Provosts therefore retained the sole function of inferior judges over vassals with original jurisdiction concurrent with bailies over claims against nobles and actions reserved for royal courts (cas royaux). This followed a precedent established in the chief feudal courts in the 13th and 14th centuries in which summary provostship suits were distinguished from solemn bailliary sessions.

== Politics ==
=== Carolingian legacy ===
During the later years of Charlemagne's rule, the Vikings made advances along the northern and western perimeters of his kingdom. After Charlemagne's death in 814 his heirs were incapable of maintaining political unity and the empire began to crumble. The Treaty of Verdun of 843 divided the Carolingian Empire, and Charles the Bald ruled over West Francia, roughly corresponding to the territory of modern France.

Viking advances were allowed to escalate, and their dreaded longboats were sailing up the Loire and Seine and other inland waterways, wreaking havoc and spreading terror. In 843 Viking invaders murdered the Bishop of Nantes, and a few years after that, they burned the Church of Saint Martin at Tours, and in 845 the Vikings sacked Paris. During the reign of Charles the Simple, Normans under Rollo were settled in an area on either side of the Seine, downstream from Paris, that was to become Normandy.

The Carolingians were subsequently to share the fate of their predecessors: after an intermittent power struggle between the two families, the 987 accession of Hugh Capet, Duke of France and Count of Paris, established on the throne the Capetian dynasty which with its Valois and Bourbon offshoots was to rule France for more than 800 years. Capet was previously "Duke of the Franks" and then became "King of the Franks" (Rex Francorum).

The Carolingian era had seen the gradual emergence of institutions which were to condition France's development for centuries to come: the acknowledgement by the crown of the administrative authority of the realm's nobles within their territories in return for their (sometimes tenuous) loyalty and military support, a phenomenon readily visible in the rise of the Capetians and foreshadowed to some extent by the Carolingians' own rise to power.

=== First Capetians (940–1108) ===
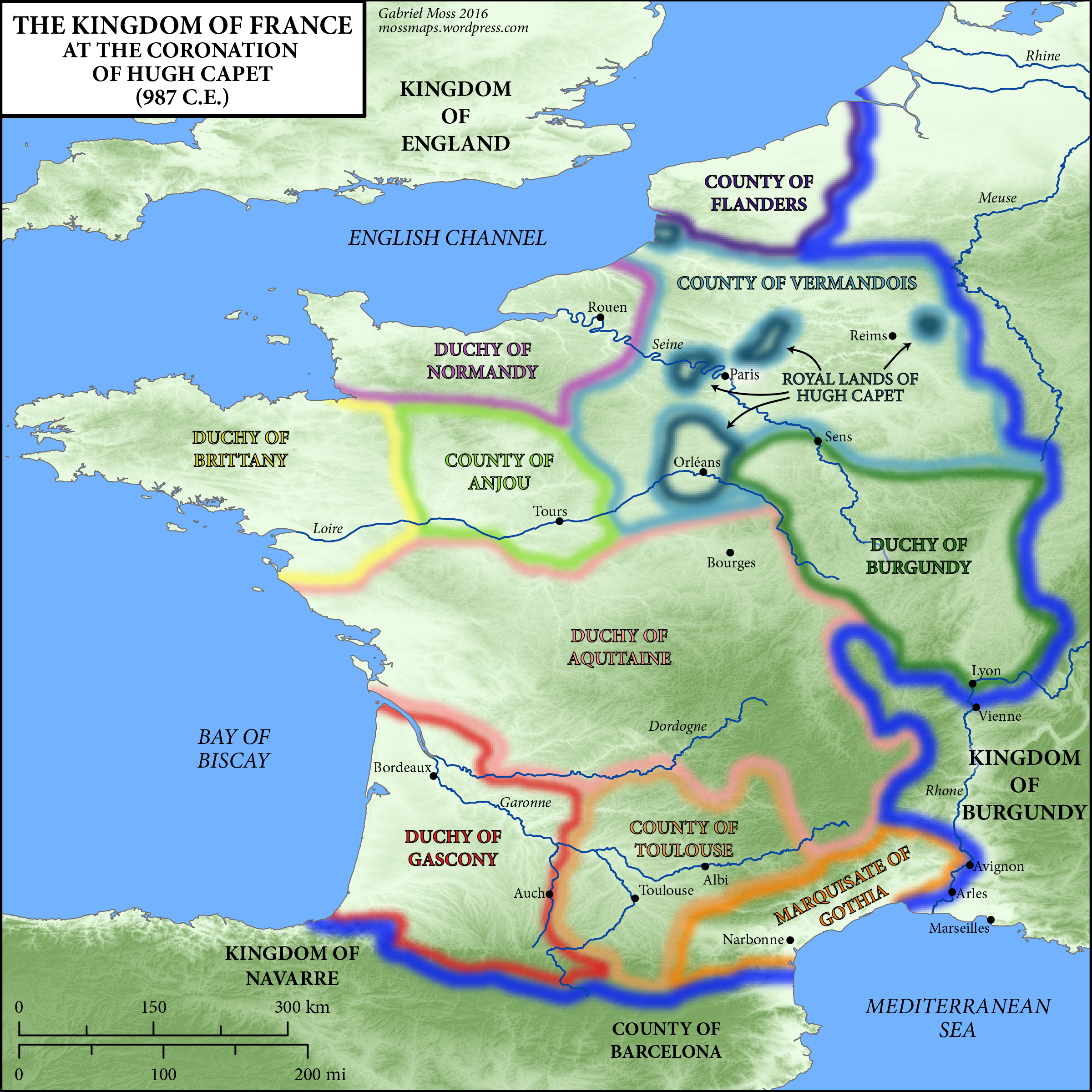
France at the Coronation of Hugh Capet

The history of medieval France starts with the election of Hugh Capet by an assembly summoned in Reims in 987. Hugh's lands extended little beyond the Paris basin; his political unimportance weighed against the powerful barons who elected him. Many of the king's vassals (who included for a long time the kings of England) ruled over territories far greater than his own. He was recorded to be recognised king by the Gauls, Bretons, Danes, Aquitanians, Goths, Spanish and Gascons. The new dynasty was in immediate control of little beyond the middle Seine and adjacent territories, while powerful territorial lords such as the 10th- and 11th-century counts of Blois accumulated large domains of their own through marriage and through private arrangements with lesser nobles for protection and support.

Count Borell of Barcelona called for Hugh's help against Islamic raids, but even if Hugh intended to help Borell, he was otherwise occupied in fighting Charles of Lorraine. The loss of other Spanish principalities then followed, as the Spanish marches grew more and more independent. Hugh is not a well documented figure, his greatest achievement being certainly to survive as king and defeating the Carolingian claimant, thus allowing him to establish what would become one of Europe's most powerful house of kings.

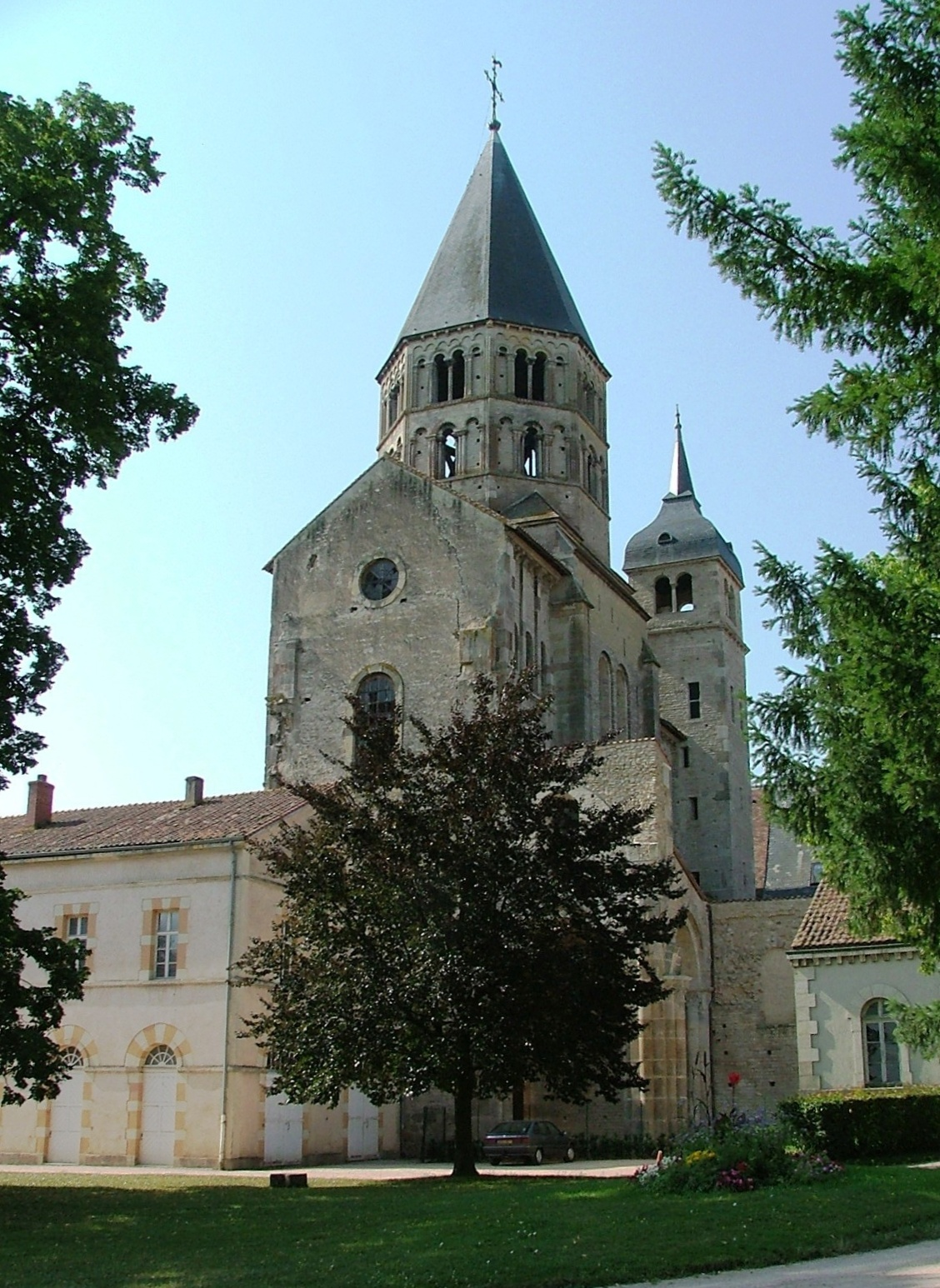
A view of the remains of the Abbey of Cluny, a Benedictine monastery, was the centre of monastic life revival in the Middle Ages and marked an important step in the cultural rebirth following the Early Middle Ages.

Hugh's son Robert the Pious was crowned King of the Franks before Hugh's demise, in order to have his succession secured. King Robert met Holy Roman Emperor Henry II in 1023 on the borderline. They agreed to end all claims over each other's realm, setting a new stage of Capetian and Ottonian relationships. Although a king weak in power, Robert's efforts were considerable. His surviving charters imply he relied heavily on the Church to rule France, much like his father did. Although he lived with a mistress – Bertha of Burgundy – and was excommunicated because of this, he was regarded as a model of piety for monks (hence his nickname, Robert the Pious). The reign of Robert was quite important because it involved the Peace and Truce of God (beginning in 989) and the Cluniac Reforms.

Robert crowned his son Hugh Magnus as King of the Franks at age 10 to secure the succession, but Hugh Magnus rebelled against his father and died fighting him in 1025. Robert's next son, Henry I reigned from 1027 to 1060. Like Hugh Magnus, Henry was crowned as co-ruler with his father, in the Capetian tradition, but he had little power or influence as junior king while his father still lived. Henry was crowned after Robert's death in 1031, which is quite exceptional for a French king of the times. Henry was one of the weakest kings of the Franks, and his reign saw the rise of some very powerful nobles such as William the Conqueror. Henry's biggest source of concerns was his brother Robert who was pushed by his mother to the conflict. Robert was made Duke of Burgundy Henry and had to be satisfied with that title. From Henry onward, the dukes of Burgundy were relatives of the king of the Franks until the end of the Duchy proper.

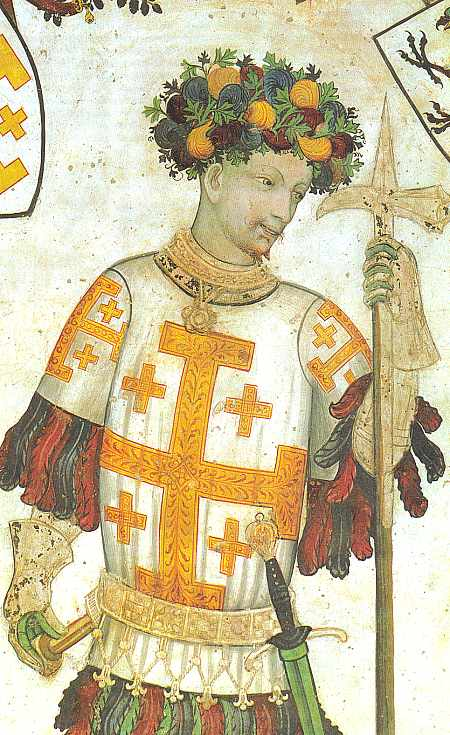
Godefroy de Bouillon, a French knight, leader of the First Crusade and founder of the Kingdom of Jerusalem.

King Philip I, named by his Kievan mother with a typically Eastern European name, was no more fortunate than his predecessor although the kingdom did enjoy a modest recovery during his extraordinarily long reign (1060–1108). His reign also saw the launch of the First Crusade to regain the Holy Land, which heavily involved his family although he personally did not support the expedition.

The area around the lower Seine, ceded to Scandinavian invaders as the Duchy of Normandy in 911, became a source of particular concern when Duke William took possession of the Kingdom of England in the Norman Conquest of 1066, making himself and his heirs the king's equal outside France (where he was still nominally subject to the Crown).

=== Louis VI and Louis VII (1108–1180) ===
It is from Louis VI (r. 1108–1137) onward that royal authority became more accepted. Louis was more a soldier and warmongering king than a scholar. The way the king raised money from his vassals made him quite unpopular; he was described as greedy and ambitious and that is corroborated by records of the time. His regular attacks on his vassals, although damaging the royal image, reinforced the royal power. From 1127 onward Louis had the assistance of a skilled religious statesman, Abbot Suger. The abbot was the son of a minor family of knights, but his political advice was valuable to the king. Louis successfully defeated, both military and politically, many of the robber barons. He frequently summoned his vassals to the court, and those who did not show up often had their land possessions confiscated and military campaigns mounted against them. This drastic policy clearly imposed some royal authority on Paris and its surrounding areas. When Louis died in 1137, much progress had been made towards strengthening Capetian authority.

Thanks to Suger's political advice, King Louis VII enjoyed greater moral authority over France than his predecessors. Powerful vassals paid homage to the French king. Suger arranged the 1137 marriage between Louis and Eleanor of Aquitaine in Bordeaux, which made Louis Duke of Aquitaine and gave him considerable power. However, the couple disagreed over the burning of more than a thousand people in Vitry during the conflict against the count of Champagne. Louis was deeply horrified by the event and sought penitence by going to the Holy Land. He later involved the Kingdom of France in the Second Crusade, but his relationship with Eleanor did not improve. The marriage was ultimately annulled by the pope under the pretext of consanguinity, and Eleanor married the Duke of Normandy, Henry Fitzempress, who would become King of England as Henry II two years later. Louis was once a very powerful monarch and was now facing a much stronger vassal, who was his equal as king of England and his strongest prince as duke of Normandy and Aquitaine. Suger's vision of construction became what is now known as Gothic architecture. This style became standard for most European cathedrals built in the late Middle Ages.

Henry had inherited the Duchy of Normandy through his mother Matilda and the County of Anjou from his father, Geoffrey of Anjou, and in 1152, he married Eleanor, who ruled much of southwest France. After defeating a revolt led by Eleanor and three of their four sons, Henry had Eleanor imprisoned, made the Duke of Brittany his vassal, and in effect ruled the western half of France as a greater power than the French throne. However, disputes among Henry's descendants over the division of his French territories, coupled with John of England's lengthy quarrel with Philip II, allowed Philip to recover influence over most of this territory. After the French victory at the Battle of Bouvines in 1214, the English monarchs maintained power only in southwestern Duchy of Guyenne.

The late direct Capetian kings were considerably more powerful and influential than the earliest ones. While Philip I could hardly control his Parisian barons, Philip IV could dictate popes and emperors. The late Capetians, although they often ruled for a shorter time than their earlier peers, were often much more influential. This period also saw the rise of a complex system of international alliances and conflicts opposing, through dynasties, Kings of France and England and Holy Roman Emperor.

=== Philip II Augustus and Louis VIII (1180–1226) ===
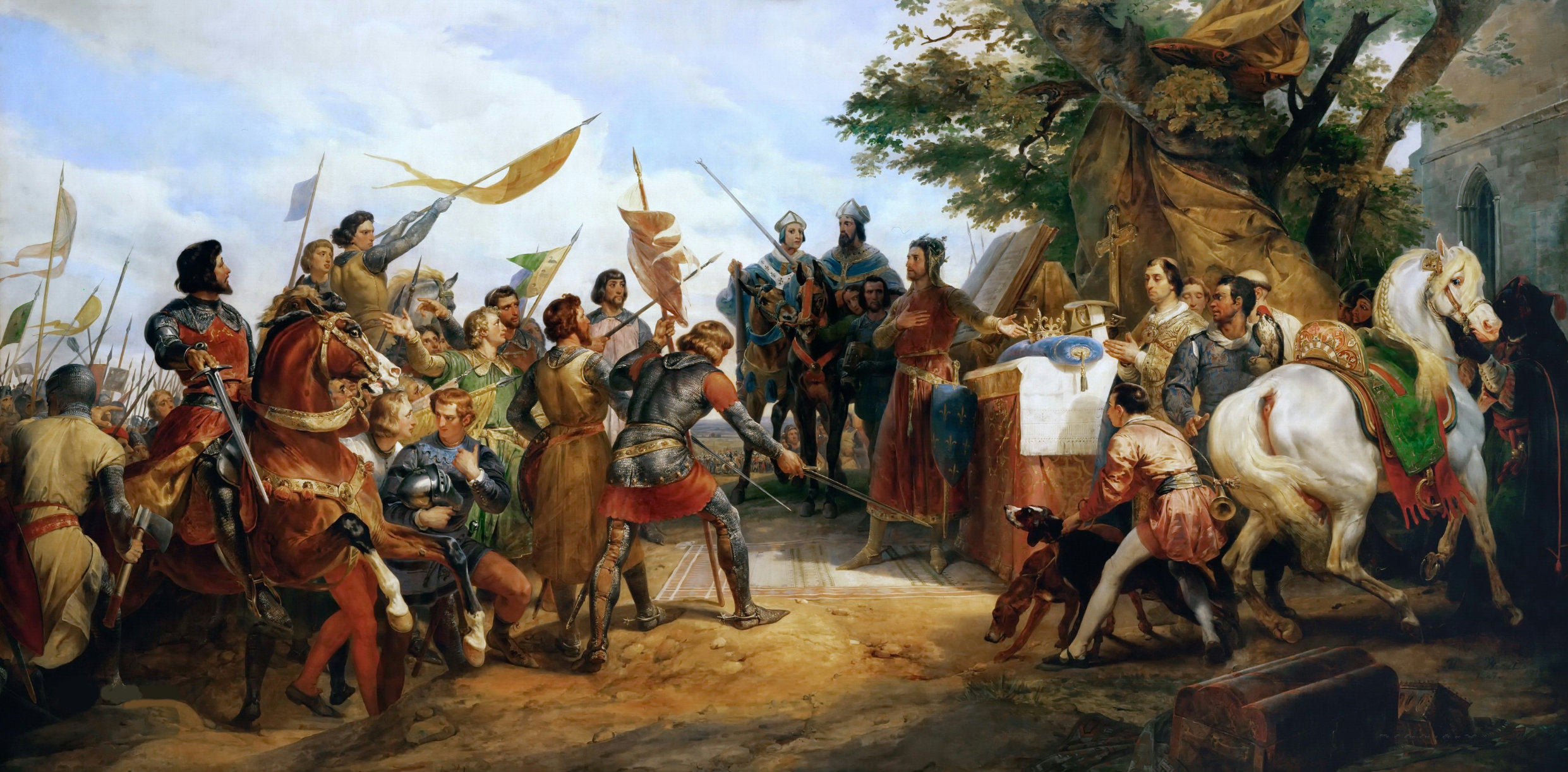
Philip II victorious at Bouvines thus annexing Normandy and Anjou into his royal domains. This battle involved a complex set of alliances from three important states, the Kingdoms of France and England and the Holy Roman Empire.

The reign of Philip II Augustus marked an important step in the history of French monarchy. His reign saw the French royal domain and influence greatly expanded. Philip spent an important part of his reign fighting the Angevin Empire, which was probably the greatest threat to the King of France since the rise of the Capetian dynasty. During the first part of his reign Philip tried using Henry II of England's son against him. He allied himself with the Duke of Aquitaine and son of Henry – Richard Lionheart – and together they launched a decisive attack on Henry's castle and home of Chinon and removed him from power.

Richard replaced his father as King of England afterward. The two kings then went crusading during the Third Crusade; however, their alliance and friendship broke down during the crusade. The two men were once again at odds and fought each other in France until Richard was on the verge of totally defeating Philip. Adding to their battles in France, the Kings of France and England were trying to install their respective allies at the head of the Holy Roman Empire. If Philip supported Philip of Swabia, member of the House of Hohenstaufen, then Richard Lionheart supported Otto IV, member of the House of Welf. Philip of Swabia had the upper hand, but his premature death made Otto IV Holy Roman Emperor. The crown of France was saved by Richard's demise after a wound he received fighting his own vassals in Limousin.

John, Richard's successor as king of England, refused to come to the French court for a trial against the Lusignans and, as Louis VI had done often to his rebellious vassals, Philip II confiscated John's possessions in France. John's defeat was swift, and his attempts to reconquer his French possession at the decisive 1214 Battle of Bouvines resulted in complete failure. The annexation of Normandy and Anjou was confirmed, the counts of Boulogne and Flanders were captured, and Otto IV was overthrown by Philip's ally Frederick II. Aquitaine and Gascony survived the French conquest, for the Duchess Eleanor still lived. Philip was crucial in ordering Western European politics in both England and France. Philip founded the Sorbonne and made Paris a city for scholars.

Prince Louis (the future Louis VIII, reigned 1223–1226) was involved in the subsequent English civil war as French and English (or rather Anglo-Norman) aristocracies were once one and were now split between allegiances. While the French kings were struggling against the Plantagenets, the Church called for the Albigensian Crusade. Southern France was then largely absorbed in the royal domains.

=== Saint Louis (1226–1270) ===
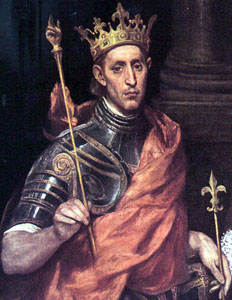
Saint Louis saw France's cultural expansion in the Western Christian world.

France became a truly centralised kingdom under Louis IX (reigned 1226–1270). Saint Louis has often been portrayed as a one-dimensional character, a flawless example of the faith and an administrative reformer who cared for the governed ones. However, his reign was far from perfect for everyone: he made unsuccessful crusades, his expanding administrations raised opposition, and he burned Jewish books at the pope's urging. His judgments were not often practical, although they seemed fair by the standards of the time. It appears Louis had a strong sense of justice and always wanted to judge people himself before applying any sentence. This was said about Louis and French clergy asking for excommunications of Louis' vassals:

For it would be against God and contrary to right and justice if he compelled any man to seek absolution when the clergy were doing him wrong.

Louis IX was 12 years old when he became king of France. His mother, Blanche of Castile, was the effective power as regent (although she did not formally use the title). Blanche's authority was strongly opposed by the French barons yet she maintained her position until Louis was old enough to rule by himself. In 1229 the king had to struggle with a long-lasting strike at the University of Paris. The Latin Quarter was strongly hit by these strikes.

The kingdom was vulnerable: war was still going on in the County of Toulouse, and the royal army was occupied fighting resistance in Languedoc. Count Raymond VII of Toulouse signed the Treaty of Paris in 1229, in which he retained much of his lands for life, but his daughter, married to Count Alfonso of Poitou, produced him no heir and so the County of Toulouse went to the King of France.

King Henry III of England had not recognized the Capetian overlordship over Aquitaine and still hoped to recover Normandy and Anjou and reform the Angevin Empire. He landed in 1230 at Saint-Malo with a massive force. Henry's allies in Brittany and Normandy fell down because they did not dare fight their king, who led the counterstrike himself. This evolved into the 1242 Saintonge War. Henry was defeated and had to recognize Louis' overlordship, although the king of France did not seize Aquitaine from Henry. Louis was now the most important landowner of France, adding to his royal title. There were some opposition to his rule in Normandy, yet it proved remarkably easy to rule, especially compared to the County of Toulouse which had been brutally conquered. The Conseil du Roi, which would evolve into the Parlement, was founded in these times.

Louis supported new forms of art such as Gothic architecture; his Sainte-Chapelle became a very famous gothic building, and he is also credited for the Morgan Bible. The kingdom was involved in two crusades under Louis: the Seventh Crusade and the Eighth Crusade. Both proved to be complete failures for Louis. He died in the Eighth Crusade, and Philip III became king.

The 13th century was to bring the crown important gains also in the south, where a papal-royal crusade against the region's Albigensian or Cathar heretics (1209) led to the incorporation into the royal domain of Lower (1229) and Upper (1271) Languedoc.

=== Philip III and Philip IV (1270–1314) ===
After Louis IX died of bubonic plague crusading in Tunisia in 1270, his son Philip III (1270–1285) followed him. Philip was called "the Bold" on the basis of his abilities in combat and on horseback, and not because of his character or ruling abilities. Philip continued the steady expansion of the royal domain. He inherited Toulouse in 1271 from his uncle and married his son and heir to the heiress of Champagne and Navarre.

After taking the throne, Philip felt obliged to continue his father's apparently solid diplomacy despite changing circumstances. In 1282 the misrule of Charles of Anjou in Sicily compelled the island's populace to rebel in favor of King Peter III of Aragon. As Pope Martin IV was a close ally of Philip, he immediately excommunicated Peter and offered his throne to one of the French king's sons. Since Philip IV was already slated to inherit Navarre, the entire Spanish March seemed ripe for reconquest by France. However, Philip III's attempted crusade against Aragon in 1285, a blatantly political affair, ended in disaster as an epidemic struck his army, which then was soundly defeated by Aragonese forces at the Battle of the Col de Panissars. Philip died of dysentery shortly afterwards in Perpignan.

Of the later Capetian rulers, Philip IV was the greatest, bringing royal power to the strongest level it would attain in the Middle Ages, yet alienated a great many people and generally left France exhausted. As such, his sons were obliged to follow a more restrained course without abandoning their father's ambitions. Philip for the most part ignored the Mediterranean and instead focused his foreign policy efforts on France's northern frontiers. Some of this was done at the expense of the Holy Roman Emperors, but the king's most aggressive actions were against England. Disputes over Aquitaine were a bone of contention for years, and in 1294 the Gascon War broke out. The French armies drove deep into Gascony, leading Edward I of England to join forces with Flanders and other allies on the northern borders of France. The allied forces were soundly beaten in 1297 by a French army led by Robert of Artois, and a truce was agreed to, leading to preservation of the status quo ante bellum. As part of the peace arrangement, Edward married Philip's sister, and the son and daughter of both kings were slated to marry.

Flanders remained stubbornly rebellious and insubordinate. Although their count had been imprisoned by Philip, this did not prevent the Flemish burghers from rising up against French troops stationed there, inflicting a sensational defeat on them at the 1302 Battle of Courtrai. Eventually however, the king began a new offensive into Flanders and a peace was finally agreed to in 1305 which however still failed to placate the Flemish townsmen.

Philip extended royal jurisdiction by treaty into the ecclesiastical territories of Vivers, Cahors, Mende, and Le Puy. With all this, the king could now assert power nearly anywhere in France, yet there was still a great deal of work yet to be done and French rulers for the time being continued to do without Brittany, Burgundy, and numerous lesser territories although they legislated for the whole realm. Governmental administration in France during this period became more bureaucratic and sophisticated along with the steady expansion of royal power. Even so, the Capetian kings should not be taken as arbitrary tyrants since feudal custom and tradition still acted as restraints on them.

If Philip's policies provoked hostility and complaints, it was because they favored no class in particular. The king's policy towards the towns remained fairly traditional, but this was not the case with the Church. When he wanted to tax French clergy to fund military campaigns, he encountered the objection of Pope Boniface VIII. The pope had received a number of complaints from French and English clergy over lay taxes and thus issued the bull Clericis lacios in 1296 declaring that papal consent was necessary for this. Philip however became infuriated and issued loud arguments in defense of his actions, leaving the clergy divided over the matter. Eventually the pope withdrew his objection.

In 1301, fresh trouble erupted when the Bishop of Pamiers was accused by Philip of heresy and treason, leading to another protest from Boniface that Church property could not be confiscated without Rome's permission and that all Christian rulers were subordinate to papal authority. The pope summoned French clergy to the Vatican to debate a reform of the kingdom. Once again the prelates were left divided between loyalty to their country and loyalty to the Church. Those who took the side of Philip met in a large assembly in Paris along with other segments of French society criticizing the pope, who responded by excommunicating the king and all clergy who had supported him. The following year, Philip struck back with a vengeance. Prelates loyal to the crown formed a scheme to bring Boniface to trial, and the pope was summarily arrested at Anagni that September. He was beaten by his jailers and threatened with execution if he did not resign the papacy, but he refused. The 68-year-old pope was released from captivity after only a few days and died several weeks later.

Philip ensured that he would never again have trouble with the Church by promoting Raymond Bertrand de Got, archbishop of Bordeaux, as the next pope. The papal conclave was evenly divided between French and Italian cardinals, but the cardinals acquiesced and de Got became Pope Clement V. Thus, Philip successfully installed an obedient French puppet in the papacy that was moved to Avignon.

Philip also signed the Auld Alliance and established the Parlement of Paris. One of the more bizarre episodes of Philip's reign was his involvement in the destruction of the Knights Templar. The Templars had been founded during the Crusades more than a century earlier but now consisted of old men whose prestige was greatly diminished after the fall of the Holy Land and no longer seemed to serve any useful purpose worth their privileges. Unable to find suitable evidence of misdeeds by the Templars to justify disposing of the order, Philip had to resort to a mass meeting at Tours in 1308 to rally support. In 1312 Clement V, despite his misgivings, issued a bull ordering their dissolution. The Templars' possessions were handed over to the Knights Hospitallers and their remaining members imprisoned or executed for heresy.

=== Louis X, Philip V and Charles IV (1314–1328) ===
In 1314, Philip IV died abruptly in a hunting accident, and the throne passed to his son Louis X (1314–1316). Louis's brief reign saw further unsuccessful attempts to assert control over Flanders as the king mobilized an army along the border, but supply problems caused the effort to break down. Louis died in the summer of 1316 of an unknown illness (possibly gastroenteritis) after consuming a large quantity of chilled wine following a game of tennis on an extremely hot day. The king's wife was pregnant, and she gave birth to a son, John, in November, but he died after a week, and the throne passed to his brother Philip.

Philip V (1316–1322) made peace with Flanders via a marriage compact with Count Robert III of Flanders and faced continued quarrels with Edward II of England over Gascony. He made plans for a crusade to relieve the Armenian Kingdom of Cilicia, but the Flanders situation remained unstable and an attempted French naval expedition to the Middle East was destroyed off Genoa in 1319. At this point, peasants and soldiers who had originally intended to invade Flanders rose in a popular Shepherd's Crusade which once again turned into an assault on the nobility, tax collectors, and Jews. Pope John XXII denounced the uprising, and Philip was forced to send troops to break it up.

In 1321, a rumor began spreading through the country that Jews in the employ of foreign Muslim rulers were using lepers to poison drinking wells. With the Shepherd's Crusade still fresh in everyone's mind, a volatile situation had formed especially as Philip had granted tolerance to Jews and even employed some in his service. With the king facing potential disaster no matter what side he took, his health began to fail from stress, and he succumbed in early 1322.

Having failed to produce a son that survived infancy, Philip was succeeded by his brother (and the youngest of Philip IV's sons) Charles IV (1322–1328). Charles faced much of the same problems as his predecessors (namely the quarrels over Flanders and Gascony). Having put an end to the chaos in southern France that his brother faced, he turned his attention to the unrest in Flanders, but then a revolt broke out in Gascony over the unwelcome construction of a fortress on the border by a French vassal. The king's uncle Charles of Valois invaded the province, whereupon the former declared Edward II's claims to it null and void. Although Charles' sister married the English king, he still refused to return Gascony and finally came to an agreement to divide it up among the two rulers.

Charles was also eager to begin a crusade in the Levant and had once plotted to become Byzantine emperor. He failed to work out an agreement with the pope over funding the expedition, and his attention was distracted by the events in Gascony. But in 1327, a French ambassador traveled to Constantinople and found the Byzantine Empire beset by civil wars. Charles died in 1328, ending any plans for crusades in the region.

=== Hundred Years' War (1328–1453) ===
Charles IV died with no male heirs, ending the main Capetian line. Under Salic law the crown could not pass through a woman (Philip IV's daughter was Isabella, whose son was Edward III of England), so the throne passed to Philip VI, son of Charles of Valois. This, in addition to a long-standing dispute over the rights to Gascony in the south of France and the relationship between England and the Flemish cloth towns, led to the Hundred Years' War.

French losses in the first phase of the conflict (1337–1360) were partly reversed in the second (1369–1396); but Henry V of England's shattering victory at the Battle of Agincourt in 1415 against a France bitterly divided between rival Armagnac and Burgundian factions of the royal house led to his son Henry VI's recognition as king in Paris seven years later under the 1420 Treaty of Troyes, reducing Valois rule to the lands south of the Loire Valley.

France's humiliation was abruptly reversed in 1429 by the appearance of a restorationist movement embodied by the peasant maid Joan of Arc, who claimed the guidance of divine voices for the campaign which rapidly ended the English siege of Orléans and ended in Charles VII's coronation in Rheims. Subsequently, she was captured by the Burgundians and sold to their English allies; her execution for heresy in 1431 redoubled her value as the embodiment of France's cause.

France in 1435

Reconciliation in 1435 between Charles VII and Philippe the Good, Duke of Burgundy, removed the greatest obstacle to French recovery, leading to the recapture of Paris (1436), Normandy (1450) and Guienne (1453), reducing England's foothold to a small area around Calais (lost also in 1558). After victory over England, France's emergence as a powerful national monarchy was crowned by the "incorporation" of the Duchies of Burgundy (1477) and Brittany (1532), which had previously been independent European states.

The losses of the century of war were enormous, particularly owing to the Black Death, which arrived from Italy in 1348, spreading rapidly up the Rhone Valley and thence across most of the country: it is estimated that a population of some 18–20 million in modern-day France at the time of the 1328 hearth tax returns had been reduced 150 years later by 50% or more.

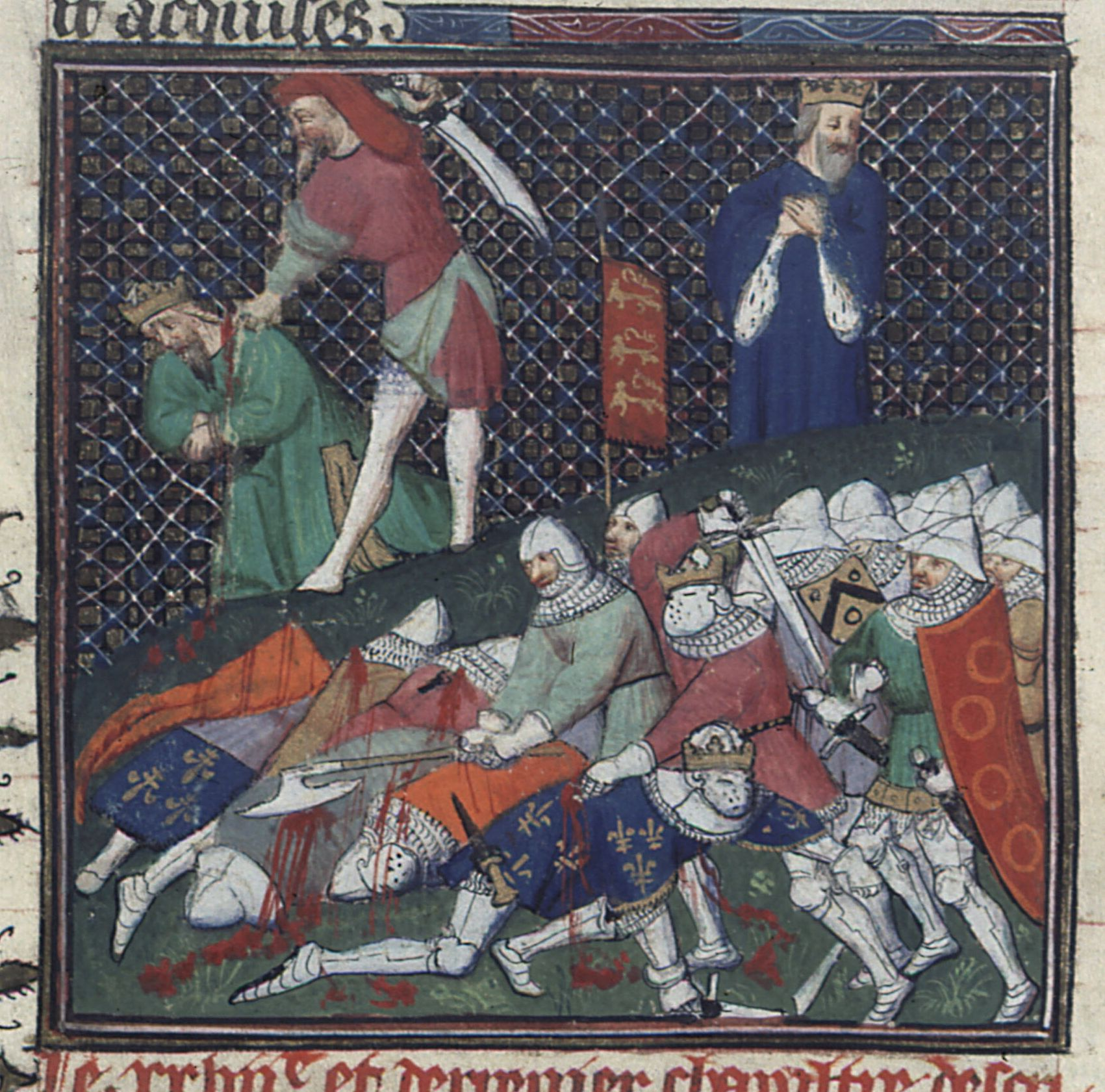
The capture of the French king John II at Poitiers in 1356

The tensions between the Houses of Plantagenet and Capet climaxed during the war when the Plantagenets claimed the throne of France from the Valois. The French population suffered much from these wars. In 1420 Henry V was made heir to Charles VI by the Treaty of Troyes. Henry V failed to outlive Charles, so it was Henry VI who consolidated the dual monarchy of England and France.

It has been argued that the difficult conditions the French population suffered during the Hundred Years' War awakened French nationalism, a nationalism represented by Joan of Arc. Although this is debatable, the Hundred Years' War is remembered more as a Franco-English war than as a succession of feudal struggles. During this war, France evolved politically and militarily.

Although a Franco-Scottish army was successful at the Battle of Baugé (1421), the humiliating defeats of Poitiers (1356) and Agincourt (1415) forced the French nobility to realise they could not stand just as armoured knights without an organised army. Charles VII (reigned 1422–1461) established the first French standing army, the Compagnies d'ordonnance, and defeated the Plantagenets once at Patay (1429) and again, using cannons, at Formigny (1450). The Battle of Castillon (1453) was regarded as the last engagement of this "war", yet Calais and the Channel Islands remained ruled by the Plantagenets.

== List of kings ==
- Capetian Dynasty (House of Capet):
  - Hugh Capet, 940–996
  - Robert the Pious, 996–1027
  - Henry I, 1027–1060
  - Philip I, 1060–1108
  - Louis VI the Fat, 1108–1137
  - Louis VII the Young, 1137–1180
  - Philip II Augustus, 1180–1223
  - Louis VIII the Lion, 1223–1226
  - Saint Louis IX, 1226–1270
  - Philip III the Bold, 1270–1285
  - Philip IV the Fair, 1285–1314
  - Louis X the Quarreller, 1314–1316
  - John I the Posthumous, five days in 1316
  - Philip V the Tall, 1316–1322
  - Charles IV the Fair, 1322–1328
- House of Valois:
  - Philip VI of Valois, 1328–1350
  - John II the Good, 1350–1364
  - Charles V the Wise, 1364–1380
  - Charles VI the Mad, 1380–1422
    - English interlude (between Charles VI and VII):
      - Henry V of England
      - Henry VI of England and France, 1422–1453
  - Charles VII the Well Served, 1422–1461

== Religion and the Church ==
- Catharism (a medieval quasi-dualist Christian group) was a notable religion in Southern France which was persecuted in the Albigensian Crusade and Medieval Inquisition after the Catholic Church denounced them as heretical.
- List of Ancien Régime dioceses of France

=== Jewish-Christian relations ===
France was primarily made up of a Christian population that maintained a positive relationship with the Jewish minority. In a historical sense, Christians and Jews both made generalizations about the success of their community relations in medieval France. The history of Jewish-Christian relations was focused primarily on the persecution that Jews faced in a prominently Christian world. In France, however, there were many examples of Jewish and Christian people working together towards a prosperity that was beneficial to both religions. They conducted business together, as well as participated in intimate social affairs. While the Jews would never fully assimilate into French culture by choice, they were accepted by the Christians in their societies.

After years of peace, in the 13th Century, Louis IX became obsessed with restricting Jewish activities. Eventually, after the Jewish population suffered multiple expulsions from France, the anti-Jewish rhetoric gained some popularity in small villages and towns. Jews began to face a fatal price for practicing their religious traditions. This discriminatory action promoted by the Royals did not take hold with the general civilian populations in large cities because a large population of Christians permitted and accepted the differing Jewish faith. Small communities however, incorporated these prejudiced ideas into their beliefs, which led to some instances of blood libels which took many Jewish lives. Blood libels consisted of accusations directed at small Jewish communities that promoted a false belief that there was a sacrificial aspect in Jewish prayer. These falsities proclaimed that a Jewish religious event included the sacrifice of a Christian child. In Blois, as many as 40 Jews were accused of killing a young Christian boy. They were found guilty and killed. Though blood libels and persecution did not define the relations, it had a large impact on the way the history of this time period is recited.

== Culture and economy ==
The period after the death of Charlemagne was marked by an economic crisis caused by political instability; town life all but disappeared. However, this had changed by the 11th century. The introduction of new crops, the improvements in the climate, and the introduction of new agricultural technologies created a large agricultural surplus. This was accompanied by the growth in town life, trade, and industry. The economy once again collapsed in the fourteenth century because of war, bad weather, and the Black Death. The rural economy was based on the manor; in urban areas economic activity was organized around guilds.

Illuminated manuscripts were diligently written and illustrated within this period, some notable examples include the Hours of Philip the Bold, the Hours of Jeanne d'Evreux and the Très Riches Heures du Duc de Berry of the 14th and 15th centuries. Some early painters included Jacquemart de Hesdin, Jean de Beaumetz and Colart de Laon. The Ars antiqua musical style was common in the High Middle Ages and Ars nova in the Late Middle Ages. A group of composers from the Notre-Dame school were active during Ars antiqua period, including Léonin and Pérotin. Troubadour culture flourished after the 12th century, exemplified Perdigon, Bertran de Born, and Raimbaut de Vaqueiras.

== Bibliography ==
=== Early Middle Ages ===
- Stéphane Lebecq. Les origines franques: Ve-IXe siècles. Series: Nouvelle histoire de la France médiévale. Paris: Editions du Seuil, 1999. ISBN 2-02-011552-2
- Chris Wickham. The Inheritance of Rome: Illuminating the Dark Ages, 400–1000. Penguin: 2009. ISBN 978-0-14-311742-1

=== High Middle Ages ===
- Dominique Barthélemy. (in French) L'ordre seigneurial: XIe-XIIe siècle. Series: Nouvelle histoire de la France médiévale, tome 3. Editions du Seuil. ISBN 2-02-011554-9
- Marc Bloch. Feudal Society. 2nd edition: Routledge, 1989. ISBN 978-0226059785
- Constance Brittain Bouchard. Strong of Body, Brave and Noble": Chivalry and Society in Medieval France. ISBN 978-0801485480
- Norman F. Cantor. The Civilization of the Middle Ages. New York: HarperPerennial, 1993. ISBN 0-06-092553-1
- Alain Demurger. (in French) Temps de crises, temps d'espoirs: XIVe-XVe siècle. Series: Nouvelle histoire de la France médiévale, tome 5. Editions du Seuil. ISBN 2-02-012221-9
- Monique Bourin-Derruau. (in French) Temps d'équilibres, temps de ruptures: XIIIe siècle. Series: Nouvelle histoire de la France médiévale, tome 4. Editions du Seuil. ISBN 2-02-012220-0
- Georges Duby. France in the Middle Ages 987–1460: From Hugh Capet to Joan of Arc. Wiley-Blackwell. 1993. ISBN 978-0631189459
- Elizabeth M. Hallam & Judith Everard. Capetian France 987–1328. Editions Longman. 2nd edition: Pearson, 2001. ISBN 978-0582404281
- William Kibler. Medieval France: An Encyclopedia Series: Routledge Encyclopedias of the Middle Ages. Routledge, 1995. ISBN 978-0824044442
