= Pastorelli =

Pastorelli is a surname. Notable people with the surname include:

- Daniel Pastorelli (born c. 1987), Australian politician
- Ilenia Pastorelli (born 1985), Italian actress
- Nicky Pastorelli (born 1983), Dutch race car driver
- Robert Pastorelli (1954–2004), American actor
- Romain Pastorelli (born 1983), French professional footballer

== See also ==
- Shepherds' Crusade (disambiguation)
