= Passagium =

Latin term for pilgrimages, later used for crusades

The term passagium (plural passagia) was a general medieval Latin term for a crusade. By the late 13th century, passagia were being qualified as either generale (general) or particulare (particular) depending on their scale and objective.

The term passagium originally meant a "passing over", "crossing" or "transit". It could refer to any journey by sea and eventually any journey at all. It was already the common term for a pilgrimage when, in the early 12th century, it became the common term for a crusade.

Perhaps as early as the Second Council of Lyon (1274) and certainly by the time of the Crusade of the Poor (1309), a distinction had was being drawn by crusade planners between a passagium generale (general passage) and passagium particulare (particular passage). The term generale passagium was used by Pope Innocent V in 1276 in a letter to Emperor Michael VIII Palaiologos concerning a future expedition involving Philip III of France, Rudolf I of Germany, Afonso III of Portugal and Charles of Salerno.

A passagium generale was an "old-style, grand international crusading expedition" that included, besides the well-trained and professional military classes, numerous poorly trained but enthusiastic volunteers. Its goal was the recovery of the Holy Land. Such an expedition was the primary aim of Pope Gregory X (1271–1276) and remained for a long time the ultimate goal of all crusade planning. In fact, "Gregory was the last pope to come close to launching a traditional passagium generale". Increasingly, the passagium particulare took precedence in practice and the passagium generale became an unrealistic dream. Both types of passagium were authorized by the papacy and came with a plenary indulgence.

A passagium particulare could be either a primum passagium (first passage) or passagium parvum (small passage), that is, either a preliminary venture preparing the way for a later passagium generale or else simply a smaller crusade with limited objectives. The passagium particulare was cheaper than a generale and could be led by a single leader, eliminating rivalries. It was a more professional undertaking, often even relying on the use of mercenaries. It could be used to organize raids or naval operations in support of the embargo on trade with the Muslims. The rise of the particular expedition at the expense of the general signified a practical turn in crusade strategy.

The passagium particulare was probably conceptualized before the fall of Acre (1291), but the terminology does not definitively appear before 1309. Many scholars see 1274 as a turning point in crusade strategy from the generale to the particulare. Many earlier crusades, however, are sometimes viewed as particular passages avant la lettre. The expeditions led by King Theobald I of Navarre and Earl Richard of Cornwall in 1239–1241, the so-called Barons' Crusade, may be seen as early instances of passagium particulare. Plans for a more limited crusade in 1267 gave way to the Eighth Crusade when King Louis IX of France took the cross. Gregory X was the first pope to combine plans for a general crusade with plans for smaller interventions, a "dual crusading policy". This policy was endorsed by the Templars, King James I of Aragon and Erard of Vallery. In 1289, in implementing the theory of the passagium particulare, Pope Nicholas IV sent 20 galleys and 1,500 soldiers to Acre for one year after the fall of Tripoli.

== Sources ==
- Baldwin, Philip Bruce (2014). Pope Gregory X and the Crusades. The Boydell Press.
- Dickson, Gary (2006). "Passagium Generale". In Alan V. Murray (ed.). The Crusades: An Encyclopedia. Vol. 4 vols. ABC-CLIO. vol. 3, p. 934.
- Dickson, Gary (2006). "Passagium Particulare". In Alan V. Murray (ed.). The Crusades: An Encyclopedia. Vol. 4 vols. ABC-CLIO. vol. 3, pp. 934–935.
- Bontea, Cornel (2018). "The Theory of the Passagium Particulare: A Commercial Blockade of the Mediterranean in the Early Fourteenth Century?". In Georgios Theotokis; Aysel Yıldız (eds.). A Military History of the Mediterranean Sea: Aspects of War, Diplomacy, and Military Elites. Brill. pp. 202–219.
- Richard, Jean (1999) [1996]. The Crusades, c.1071–c.1291. Translated by Jean Birrell. Cambridge University Press.
