= Crusade of the Poor =

Military expedition by lower classes

The Crusade of the Poor (Note: Sometimes called the Shepherds' Crusade of 1309 or simply the Crusade of 1309. In several contemporary accounts the crusaders are called pauperes (poor) and vulgares (common).) was an unauthorised military expedition—one of the so-called "popular crusades"—undertaken in the spring and summer of 1309 by members of the lower classes from England, Flanders, Brabant, northern France and the German Rhineland. Responding to an appeal for support for a crusade to the Holy Land, the men, overwhelmingly poor, marched to join a small professional army being assembled with Papal approval. Along the way, they engaged in looting, persecution of Jews and combat with local authorities. None of them reached the Holy Land and their expedition was ultimately dispersed.

== Preaching the crusade ==
The Crusade of the Poor was the first major popular expression of support for crusading after the fall of the Crusader states in the Holy Land. Acre, the last remaining city of the Kingdom of Jerusalem, fell to the Mamluks in 1291. In August 1308, Pope Clement V issued instructions for the preaching of a crusade to be launched against the Mamluks in the spring of 1309. (Note: This was one of three crusades he launched in 1309. The others were against the Christian Republic of Venice for occupying Papal territory and against the Muslim Kingdom of Granada in southern Spain.) This was to be a small, preliminary expedition led by the Hospitallers, a religious military order. (Note: Officially it was a passagium particulare (particular expedition) as opposed to a passagium generale (general expedition).) The preaching of the crusade was to solicit funds and prayers, not direct participation on the part of the laity. In early 1309 the crusade was postponed until the autumn. In June and July 1309, Clement sent letters reminding those bishops charged with the preaching of the crusade north of the Alps that they were to solicit only funds and prayers and to discourage participation. Indulgences were offered to those providing money.

Already in the spring of 1309, however, the preachers had whipped up intense crusade fervour. Large groups of would-be crusaders—tens of thousands in some accounts—began marching towards the Papal court at Avignon. These men had "taken the cross", that is, stitched crosses onto their clothing in imitation of the First Crusaders, but their participation had been rejected by the bishops preaching the crusade. Although most marched on Avignon intending to join the Hospitaller army, a few embarked on ships on the Danube intending to reach the Holy Land on their own. The universally hostile chronicle sources, most notably the Annals of Ghent, agree that they were mostly poor: landless peasants, agricultural labourers and underemployed urban artisans (such as furriers and tailors). There were a few wealthier German townsmen and even some knights, but the higher nobility was not represented. Although the majority were men, women also joined. According to the annalist of Ghent, "countless common people from England, Picardy, Flanders, Brabant, and Germany ... set off to conquer the Holy Land." The dominant component seems to have been German. The English component is likely exaggerated in the chronicles, however, since it would have been relatively easy for the English authorities to stop such would-be crusaders at the channel ports. Crusaders are recorded from as far away as Pomerania in eastern Germany and Silesia in Poland.

== Unofficial crusade ==
The poor crusaders called themselves the "Brothers of the Cross", apparently viewing themselves as something of a military order of their own. The chroniclers stress, however, that the movement was completely without any leader. Too poor to pay their own way to Avignon, they relied on charity, while also engaging in widespread robbery and plunder to fund their march. The Jews became a favoured target. Over 100 Jews who took refuge in the castle of Born in the Duchy of Guelders were massacred. The Jews of Leuven and Tienen were threatened and took refuge in the castle of Genappe in Brabant. When the crusaders besieged the castle, Duke John II of Brabant, who owed the Jews protection, sent an army to chase them off. They suffered heavy losses in the fighting with ducal troops. Despite the lack of leadership and planning, about 30–40,000 crusaders arrived at Avignon in July 1309. It is possible that a few made it to the port of Marseille, the planned embarkation point.

The "Brothers" asked Pope Clement to upgrade the planned expedition into a full crusade to legitimise their actions and permit them to fulfill their vows. Instead, on 25 July, Clement granted a 100-year indulgence to any German who had taken the cross—and to anyone who had financed such a one—but was unable to fulfill his vow to go to the Holy Land on account of the lack of ships. The Hospitallers steadfastly refused to ship any of the "Brothers". Thus, the entire body of crusaders, unable to fight on their own, was forced to disperse. According to the annalist of Ghent, they simply "returned in confusion to their own homes."

== Official crusade ==
On 4 November 1309, Pope Clement admitted what had long been suspected, that the Hospitaller expedition would not go to the Holy Land. It was merely a preparatory campaign to help defend Cyprus and enforce the prohibition on Catholics trading with Muslims. The official expedition was ready to sail from the Italian port of Brindisi in January 1310, but was delayed until spring by bad weather. It was under the direct command of the grand master, Foulques de Villaret, who was accompanied by a papal legate, Pierre de Pleine-Chassagne. The force contained 26 galleys (including some from Genoa), two or three hundred knights and about three thousand foot soldiers. When the fleet sailed it was still unknown where Villaret planned to take it. Rather than go to the Holy Land, it sailed for the Byzantine island of Rhodes. It was in Greek waters on 13 May, when Villaret sent a message of peace to Venice. The crusader army participated in the final conquest of the city of Rhodes in August. Although no expedition to the Holy Land came out of the preaching of 1308–9, Rhodes was a strategically important base for future campaigns and the Hospitallers made it their headquarters in 1311.
