= Shepherds' Crusade (1320) =

Popular crusading movement in Normandy

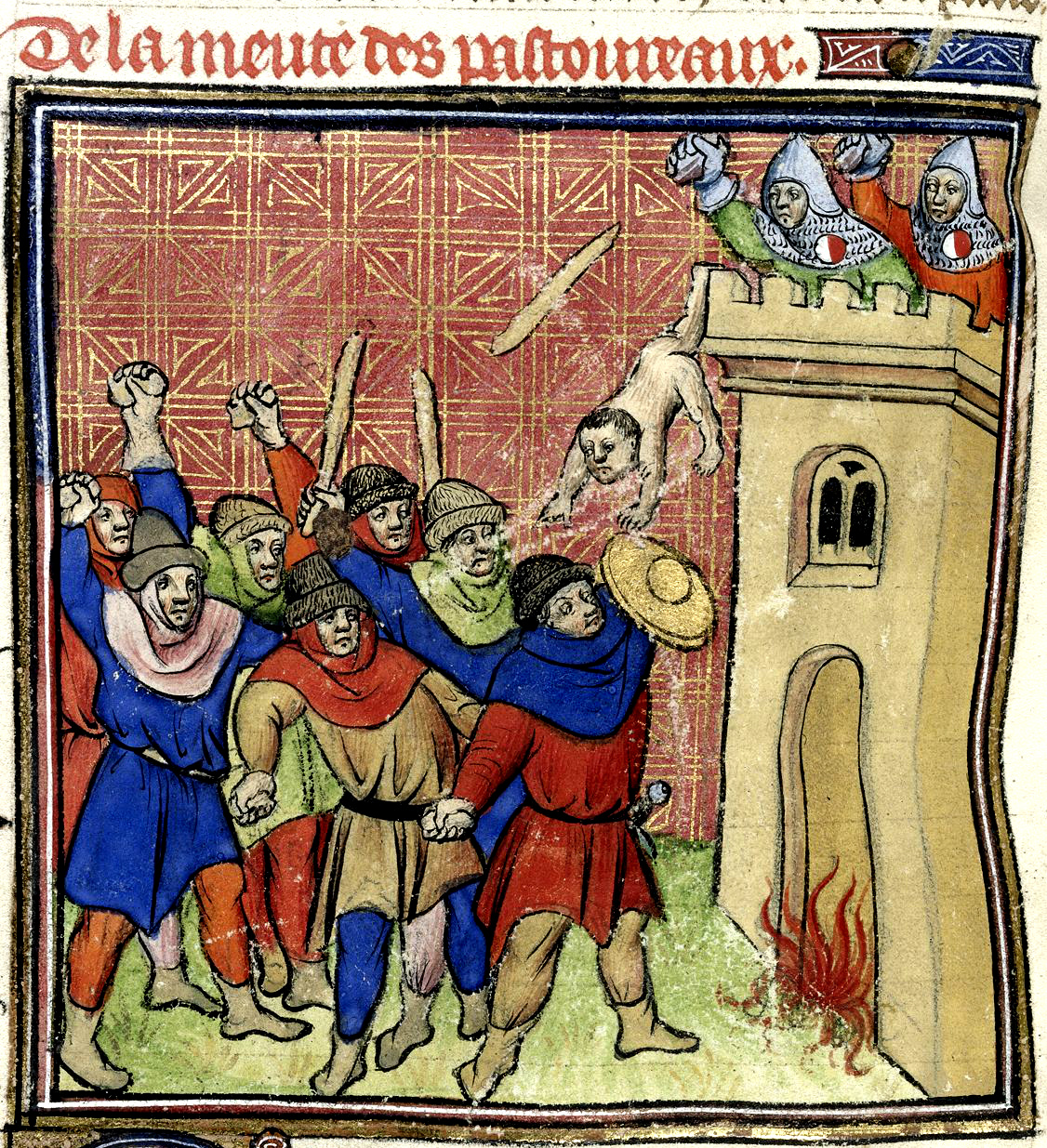
Pastoureaux killing 500 Jews at Verdun-sur-Garonne in 1320

The Shepherds' Crusade of 1320 or the Pastoureaux or Pastorelli of 1320 was a popular crusade in Normandy in June 1320. It originally began when a large group of commoners banded together to preach a crusade after a teenage shepherd said he was visited by the Holy Spirit. Initially aiming to help the Reconquista of Iberia, it failed to gain support from the church or nobility and instead murdered hundreds of Jews in France and Aragon, in Northern Spain.

The movement was in part aimed against Muslims in Spain for the sake of "purification" of the society. Later however, when the would-be crusaders moved out of Normandy towards the south of France, their target became the Jews. The movement's actions were not only an expression of antisemitism, but also a protest against the economic policies of the royals and the monarchy. Initially targeting corrupt Christian officials, these anti-royalist sentiments were transferred to local Jews under royal protection. These attacks were violent and resulted in heavy Jewish casualties. 120 communities were destroyed in large-scale massacres or pogroms. Lepers were also badly persecuted. Like the earlier crusade of the same name, it brought havoc and destruction to Jewish communities. It may have been inspired by the Inquisition in its forcible conversions of Jews.

== Causes ==
The causes of the movement are complex; however, at the time a series of famines had set in (see the Great Famine of 1315–1317) related to climatic changes (the "little ice age") and the economic situation for the rural poor had deteriorated. Furthermore, there were prophecies and talks about a new crusade. Also, indebtedness to Jewish moneylenders had been apparently eliminated with their expulsion by King Philip the Fair in 1306; however, his son Louis X brought them back and became a partner in the recovery of their debts.

Jews and lepers were also accused of well poisoning.

The initial target of the crusaders was corruption identified with wealthy Christian clerics and officials before turning to the Jews.

Jews returning from the 1306 expulsion faced difficult conditions such as famine, war, pestilence, economic hardships, and excessive taxation, making them easy targets for Christian locals, who resented them and identified them with their anti-royalist grievances due to their protection by the Crown.

The hypocritical leadership and the situation created by the people belonging to the upper class and the nobles led to the disastrous event of 1320. The Jews were representatives of the monarchy as well as tax collectors, which became one of the leading factors for the crusade. The failure of the society to take action against the violent acts that were aimed to change the current circumstances despite legitimizing the Holy war contributed to the onset of the movement. Also, the difference in the opinion of the crusaders and the king, as well as with Aymery de Cros, Seneschal of Carcassonne, were some of the reasons which infuriated the crusade to target Jews in the first place.

== Beginnings ==
The crusade started in June 1320 in Normandy, when a teenage shepherd claimed to have been visited by the Holy Spirit, which instructed him to fight the Moors in Iberia. Similar to the 1251 crusade, this movement included mostly young men, women, married couples, clerics, and children. They marched to Paris to ask Philip V to lead them, but he refused to meet with them at all. While in Paris, they liberated prisoners in the Grand Châtelet.

== Progress ==
The crusade marched south to Aquitaine, attacking castles, royal officials, priests, and lepers along the way. Their usual targets, however, were Jews, whom they attacked at Saintes, Verdun-sur-Garonne, Cahors, Albi, and Toulouse, which they reached on 12 June. Pope John XXII, in Avignon, gave orders to stop them. When they eventually crossed into Spain, their attacks on the Jews were well-known, and James II of Aragon vowed to protect his citizens. At first they were prohibited from entering the kingdom at all, but when they did enter in July, James warned all his nobles to make sure the Jews were kept safe.

As expected the shepherds did attack some Jews, especially at the fortress of Montclus, where over 300 Jews were killed. James's son Alfonso was sent out to bring them under control. Those responsible for the killings at Montclus were arrested and executed. There were no further incidents and the crusade dispersed.

== Success and downfall ==
The crusade was successful for a limited period under the rule of Philip V. The temporary success was a result of the support from town governments, Consuls, the upper class, and the public. The wealthy class although they were fearful of the movement, still provided funds to crusaders for the movement and consuls allowed them to possess the arms which were prohibited in the town. The consuls defended the crusaders when they attacked Jews, seized their money, goods and robbed churches. It was easy to get public empathy in the time of 1320; thus crusaders got the populace which along with other supporters helped them to succeed in targeting the Jews for a brief period in which they killed a large number of Jews.

However, soon the crusade came to an end and was destroyed. The movement dispersed and the Pastoureaux were captured. One major contributor to the downfall of the Pastoureaux was Alfonso, son of James II of Aragon. Pastoureaux lost their power at the hands of Alfonso. To stop the crusaders a professional military skill was directed against them which targeted the crusaders in small groups and they were reduced to nothing in a blink of an eye.

== The Jews ==
After the defeat of the crusade, the Jews were helped by the Aragonese kings to stabilize and to return to their previous positions that they occupied before the movement. Aymery de Cros, Senechal of Carcassonne, advocated for the protection of Jews based on Jews being "Serfs of the king". He warned the people of Carcassonne of strong action if they supported the crusade against the Jews. He did not want such a movement to prevail in the area under his control. Therefore, he supported and protected the Jews that were under his power.

== Aftermath ==
This "crusade" is seen as a revolt against the French monarchy, somewhat like the first Shepherds' Crusade. Jews were seen as a symbol of royal power, as they more than any other population relied on the personal protection of the king both in France and in Aragon, and were often a symbol of the royal economy as well, hated by poor and heavily taxed peasants. Only a few years previously, the Jews had been allowed to return to France, after being expelled in 1306. Any debts owed to the Jews were collected by the monarchy after their expulsion, which probably also contributed to the peasant connection of the Jews with the king.

In 1321, King Philip fined those communities in which Jews had been killed. This led to a second revolt, this time among the urban population, although later chroniclers invented the idea of a "cowherds' crusade", a second wave of the Shepherds' Crusade. Although this never occurred, there were, however, more attacks on Jews as a result of the fines.
