= Popular crusades =

Unsanctioned crusades

The popular crusades were several movements "animated by crusading enthusiasm" but unsanctioned by the Church. They contrast with the "official crusades" authorised by the Papacy. While the latter consisted of professional armies led by apostolic legates, the popular crusades were generally disorganized and consisted of peasants, artisans and only the occasional knight. The term "popular crusade" is a modern scholarly convention. The distinction between the "hierarchical" (or official) and the popular impulse in crusading was first made by historian Leopold von Ranke in the nineteenth century.

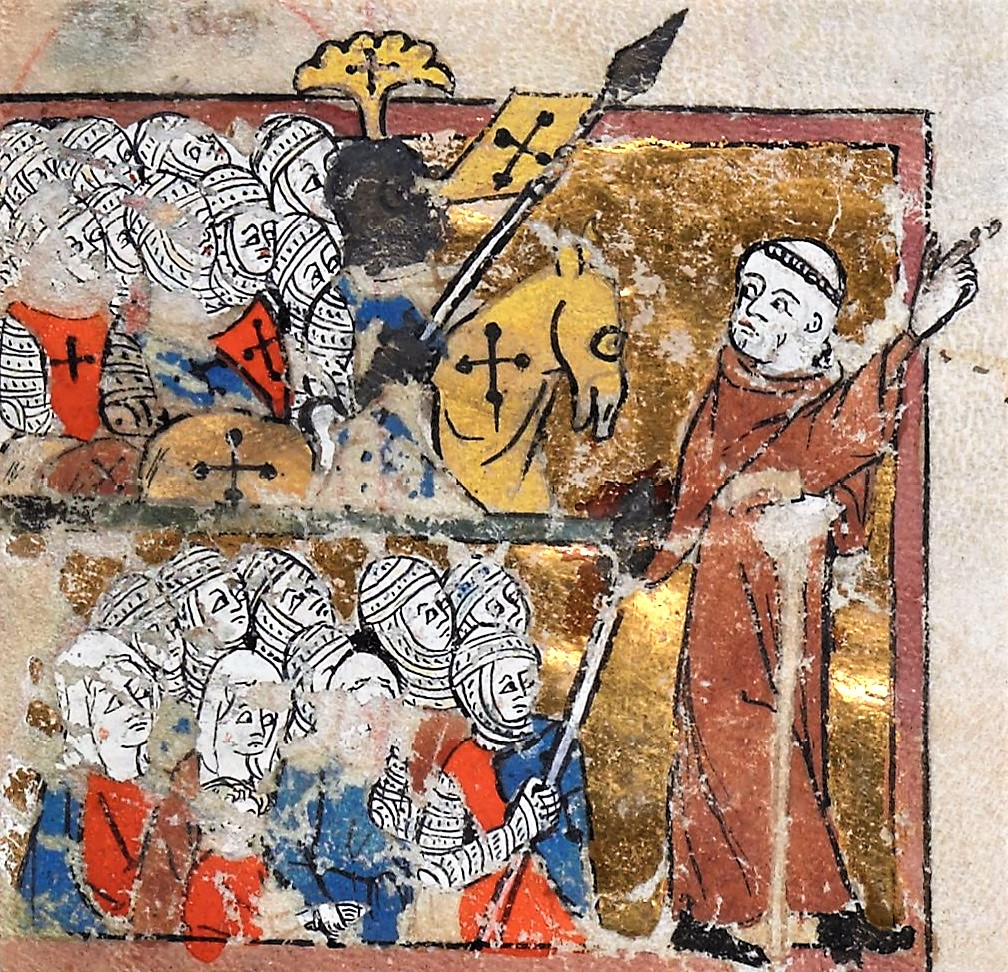
Miniature of Peter the Hermit leading the People's Crusade. From the Abreujamen de las estorias (14th century).

These events demonstrate the power of crusading ideas and the engagement of non-noble believers with the great events of Latin Christendom. All crusades that were not preached officially were illicit and unaccompanied by papal representation. But it was not until the 1320s that the papacy criticised a popular crusade. The objectives were traditional, such as regaining Jerusalem or liberating the captive King Louis IX of France. Victories in the Smyrniote crusade of 1344 aroused mass enthusiasm in Tuscany and Lombardy. Those who took part in popular crusades perceived themselves as authentic crusaders, evident in the use of pilgrimage and crusade emblems, including the cross.

== List of popular crusades ==
The movements typically regarded as popular crusades are listed below in chronological order:

- People's Crusade (1096)
- Children's Crusade (1212)
- Shepherds' Crusade (1251)
- Crusade of the Poor (1309)
- Shepherds' Crusade (1320)
- Hungarian Peasants' Crusade (1514)
