= Shepherds' Crusade (1251) =

Popular crusading movement in northern France

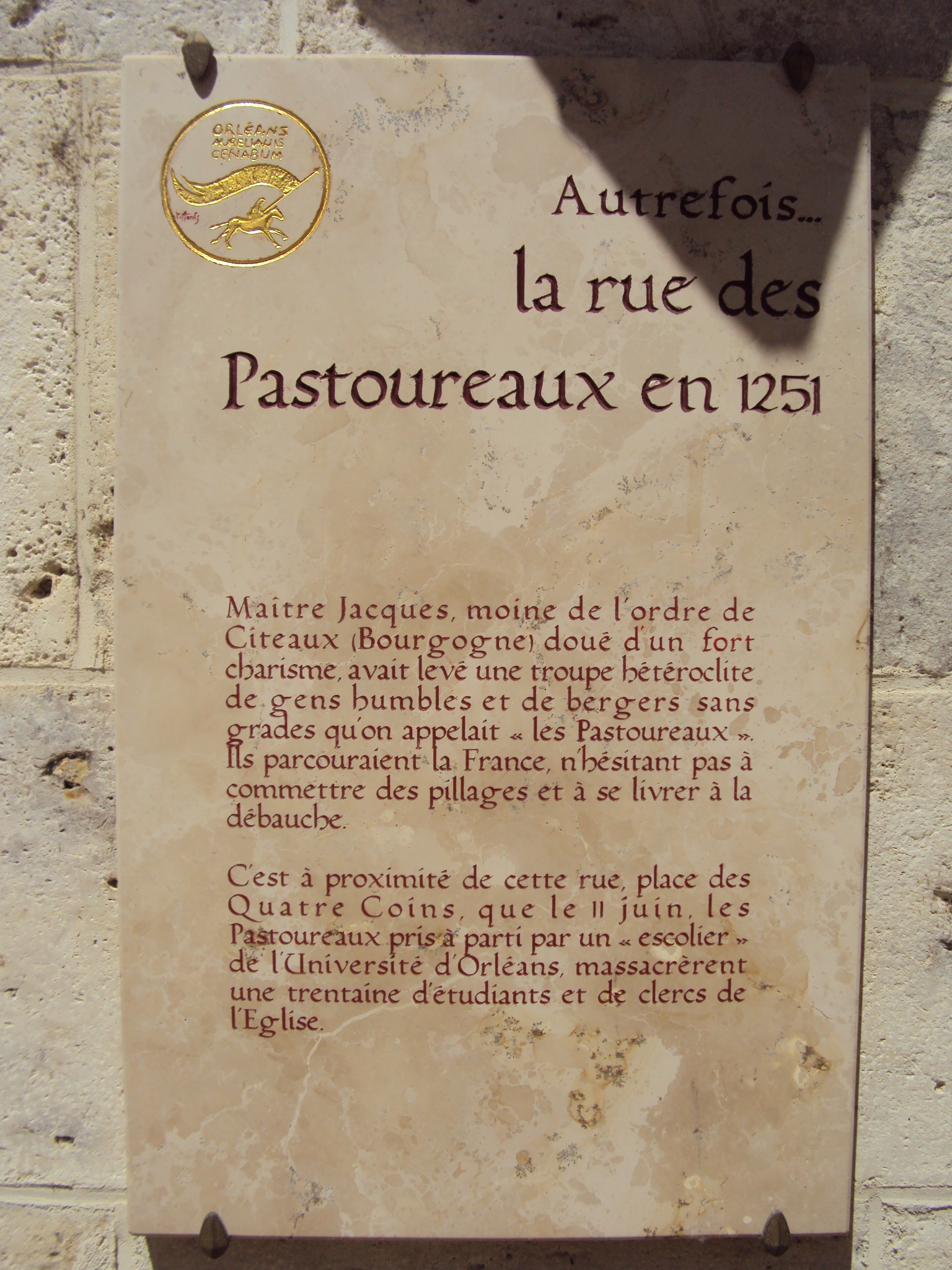
Plaque commemorating the Shepherds' Crusade in Orléans

The Shepherds' Crusade of 1251 or the Pastoureaux or Pastorelli of Spring 1251 was a popular crusade in northern France aimed at rescuing King Louis IX during the Seventh Crusade.

In 1249, Saint Louis IX of France went away on crusade, leaving his mother, Blanche of Castile, as regent during his absence. Louis was defeated and captured in Egypt at the Battle of Fariskur. When news of this reached France the next year, both nobles and peasants were deeply distressed; the king was well-loved and it was inconceivable to them that such a pious man could be defeated by heathens. Louis sent his brothers to France to get relief, where despite the efforts of Blanche of Castile, it was seen that neither the nobility nor the clergy were helping the king.

A man, apparently an old Hungarian monk living in northern France, claimed he saw a vision of the Virgin Mary in which she told him to raise a peasant army to rescue King Louis. From about Easter 1251, a group of perhaps as many as 60,000 followed him, causing disruption, especially conflict with the clergy in several cities, and later began to attack the Jewish population. They never went beyond northern France as a large group, and were eventually dispersed by order of Blanche.

The violent attacks against Jews are described as medieval pogroms. Many of the victims were prominent and wealthy members of the community.

== Formation ==
One of the outpourings of support took the form of a peasant movement in northern France, led by a man known as "the Master of Hungary" (Le Maître de Hongrie). He was apparently a very old Hungarian monk living in France, called Jacob.

The Master claimed to have been visited by the Virgin Mary, who instructed him to lead the shepherds (pastoreaux, hence the common name Crusade of the Pastoreaux) of France to the Holy Land to rescue Louis. His followers, said to number 60,000, were mostly young peasants, men, women, and children, from Brabant, Hainaut, Flanders, and Picardy. They followed him to Paris in May, where the Master met with Blanche of Castile. She gave her blessing to the group. Chronicler Matthew Paris thought he was an impostor, and that he was actually one of the leaders of the Children's Crusade from earlier in the century. Their movement in the city was restricted; they were not allowed to cross to the Left Bank, where the University of Paris was located, as Blanche perhaps feared another disturbance on the scale of the 1229 University of Paris strike.

== Dispersal ==
The crowd of shepherds split up after leaving Paris. Some of them went to Rouen, where they expelled the archbishop and threw some priests into the Seine river. In Tours they attacked monasteries. The others under the Master arrived in Orléans on June 11. Here they were denounced by the bishop, whom they also attacked, along with other clerics, including Franciscans and Dominicans. They fought with the University of Orléans students in the city as well, as Blanche might have feared would happen in Paris. Moving on to Amiens and then Bourges, they also began to attack Jews.

Blanche responded by ordering the crowds to be rounded up and excommunicated. This was done rather easily as they were simply wandering, directionless, around northern France, but the group led by the Master resisted outside Bourges, and the Master himself was killed in the ensuing skirmish. By mid-June 1251, there were no new sightings of the crusaders.

The crusade seems to have been more of a revolt against the French church and nobility, who were thought to have abandoned Louis; the shepherds, of course, had no idea of what happened to Louis, nor the logistics involved in undertaking a crusade to rescue him. After being dispersed, some of the participants travelled to Aquitaine and England, where they were forbidden to preach. Others took a true crusade vow and may have actually gone on crusade.

== Sources ==
- Margaret Wade Labarge, Saint Louis: The Life of Louis IX of France. London, 1968.
- Ernest Lavisse, Histoire de France, Tome Troisième, II. Paris, 1901.
- Régine Pernoud, La Reine Blanche. Paris, 1972.
- Peter Jackson, The Seventh Crusade, 1244–1254. Sources and Documents. Aldershot, 2007.
- Gary Dickson, Religious enthusiasm in the medieval West. Aldershot, 2000.
- Malcolm Barber, "The crusades of the shepherds in 1251", Proceedings of the Tenth Annual Meeting of the western society for French history, 1982. Lawrence, 1984.
