= Capture of Mannheim =

1622 battle of the Thirty Years' War

- Part of the Palatinate phase of the Thirty Years' War
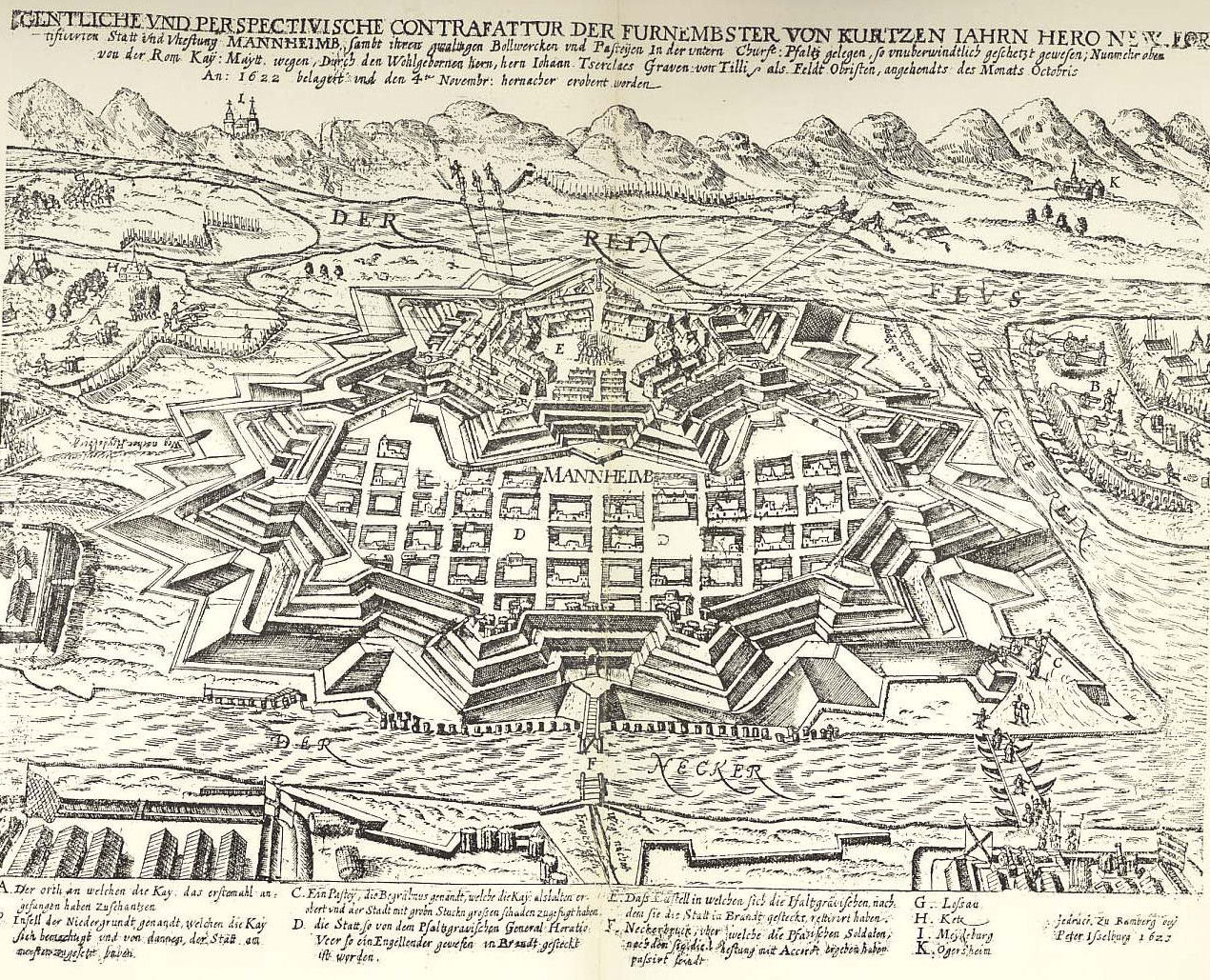
- 1627 engraving of the siege
Date	20 October – 2 November 1622
Location	Mannheim, Electoral Palatinate (present-day Germany) 49°29′N 8°28′E
Result	Imperial–Spanish victory

Belligerents
Kingdom of England; Electoral Palatinate	Holy Roman Empire; Kingdom of Spain; Catholic League

Commanders and leaders
(England) Horace Vere (England) John Burroughs	Count of Tilly
- Location within Baden-Württemberg Capture of Mannheim (Germany)

The Capture of Mannheim was achieved on 2 November 1622 by the Imperial-Spanish army commanded by Johan Tzerclaes, Count of Tilly against the Protestant troops under the Englishman Sir Horace Vere during the Thirty Years' War.

== Background ==
In September 1620, the Imperial-Spanish troops led by the Count of Tilly and Don Gonzalo Fernández de Córdoba invaded and conquered the Lower Palatinate. The Protestant garrison under Sir Horace Vere held Frankenthal, Mannheim, and Heidelberg, but the rest of the Palatinate fell into Spanish hands.

On 19 September 1622 the Imperial-Spanish army defeated the Protestant troops under Sir Gerard Herbert at the Heidelberg and the Catholic army went on to conquer the town.

== Siege of Mannheim ==
The Spanish continued their progress towards Mannheim. The city was defended by the Anglo-German-Protestants troops commanded by Horace Vere. The Count of Tilly subjected Manheim to a siege, and the Imperial-Spanish forces swiftly defeated the Protestant troops. The city was conquered by the Spaniards, forcing Vere, and a few hundred of his men, to retreat to the citadel. Finally, and without hope of reinforcements, Vere was forced to capitulate. Just Frankenthal remained under control of the Protestants commanded by Sir John Burroughs, but was taken one year later by the Spanish troops under Don Guillermo Verdugo, son of Francisco Verdugo.

== Aftermath ==
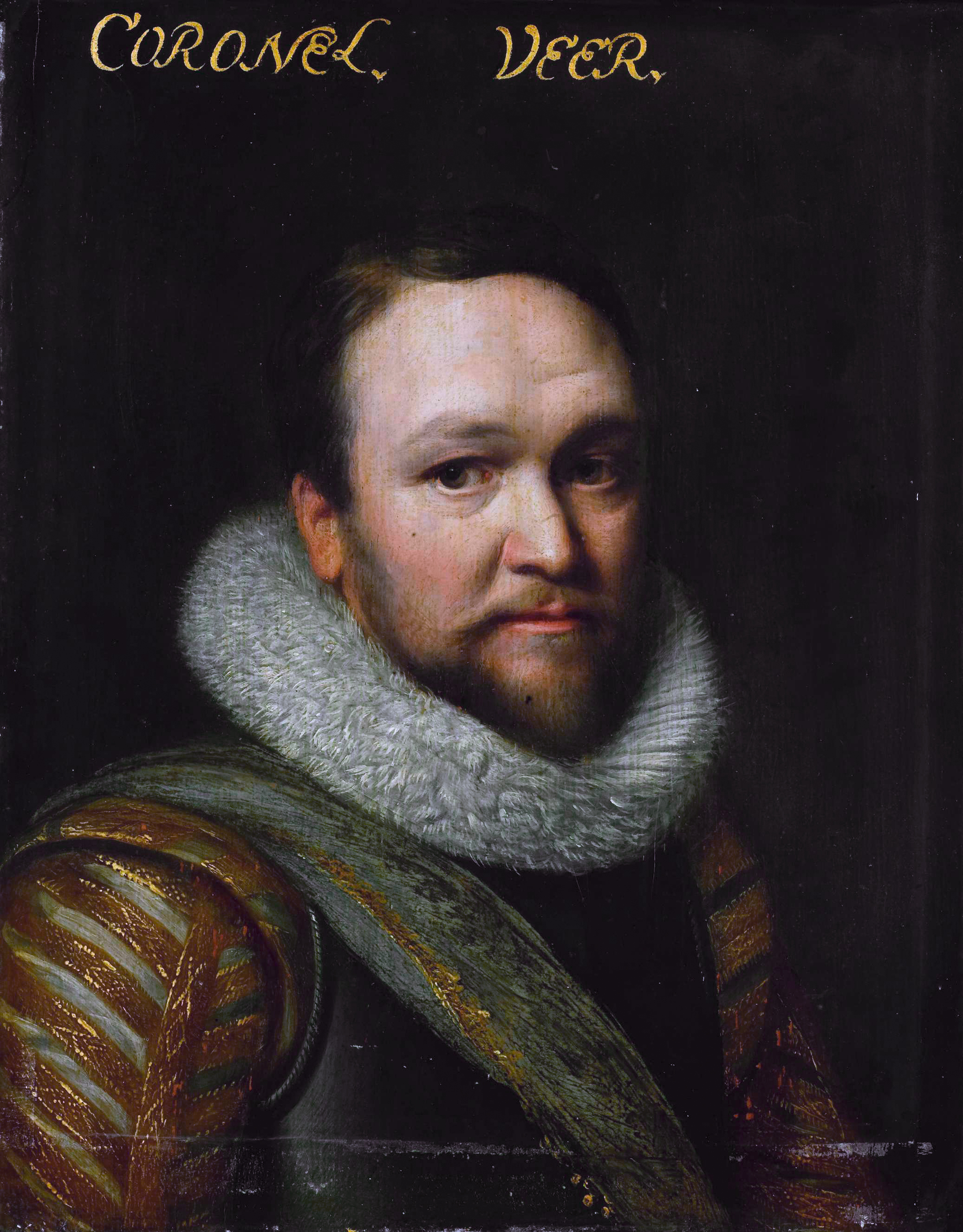
Sir Horace Vere by Michiel van Mierevelt.

The courage displayed by Horace Vere against great odds was recognised in England, when the General returned early in February 1623, even if his salary and expenses were never paid in full by the treasury. On 16 February 1623 he was appointed Master-General of the Ordnance for life, and he became a member of the Council of War on 20 July 1624.

In 1624, Vere travelled once more to The Hague in order to second Prince Maurice of Orange in the defence of the important fortress of Breda, under siege by the Spaniards under Don Ambrosio Spinola from August.

== See also ==
- Electorate of Palatinate
- Thirty Years' War
- Palatinate campaign
