= Palatinate campaign =

1620–23 phase of the Thirty Years' War

- Part of the Thirty Years' War
Date	30 August 1620 – 27 August 1623
Location	Lower Palatinate, Holy Roman Empire (present-day Baden-Wuerttemberg and Rhineland-Palatinate, Germany) 49°30′N 8°01′E
Result	Catholic victory

Belligerents
(Spain) Spanish Empire; Holy Roman Empire; Catholic League	Electoral Palatinate (Grand Duchy of Baden) Margraviate of Baden-Durlach; England; Dutch Republic

Commanders and leaders
(Spain) Ambrogio Spinola (Spain) Carlos Coloma (Spain) Gonzalo Fernández de Córdoba (Spain) Marquis of Leganés; Johann von Tilly; Maximilian of Bavaria	Frederick V (Dutch Republic) Ernst von Mansfeld; Joachim Ernst (England) Gerard Herbert † (England) Horace Vere (England) Sir John Burroughs (Dutch Republic) Christian the Younger of Brunswick (Grand Duchy of Baden) Georg Frederick (Dutch Republic) Maurice of Orange

Strength
Imperial army Army of Flanders	
- Location within modern Germany

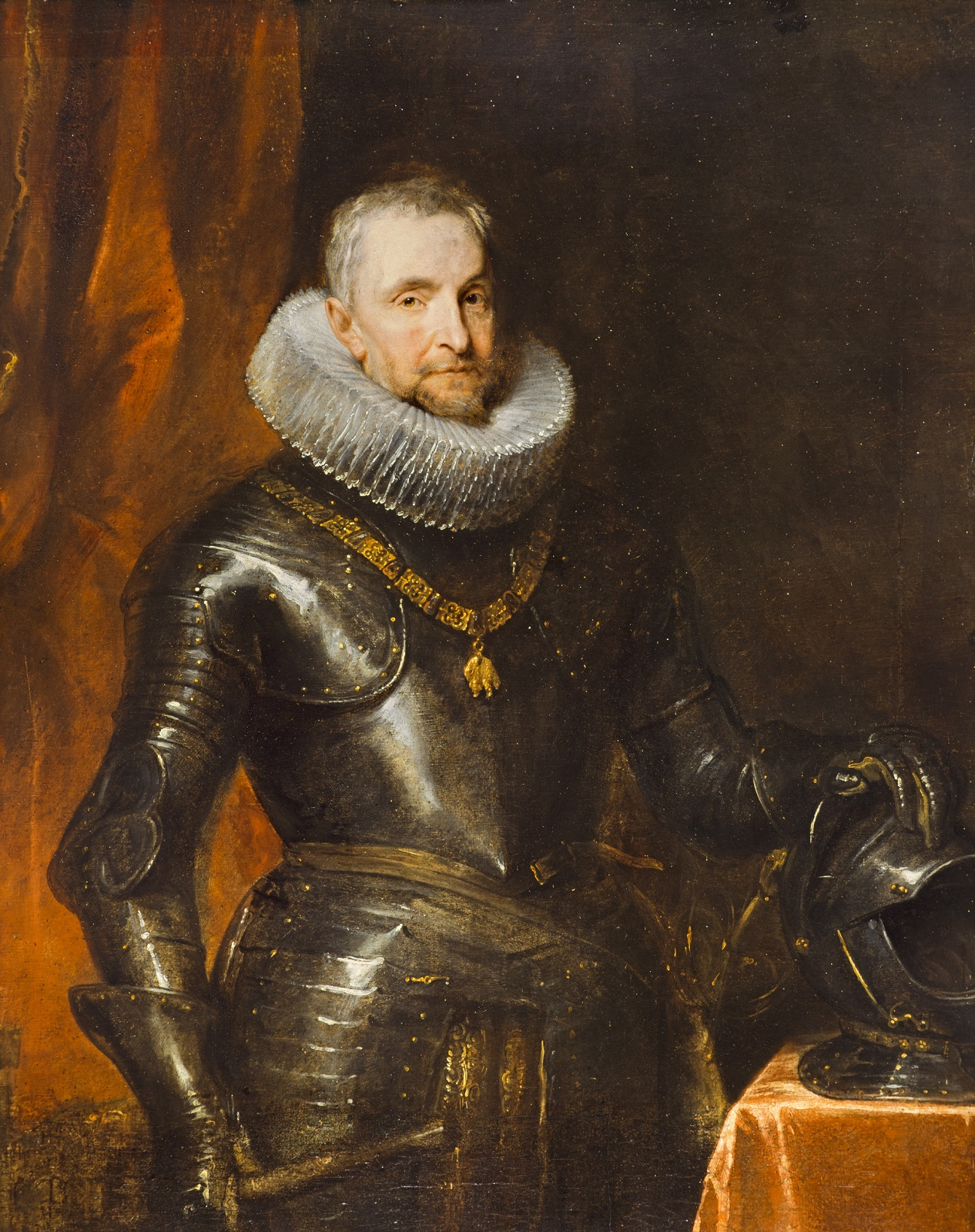
Don Ambrogio Spinola, Imperial army commander

The Palatinate campaign (30 August 1620 – 27 August 1623), also known as the Spanish conquest of the Palatinate or the Palatinate phase of the Thirty Years' War, was a campaign conducted by the Imperial army of the Holy Roman Empire against the Protestant Union in the Lower Palatinate, during the Thirty Years' War.

== Background ==
The Thirty Years War began in 1618 when the Protestant-dominated Bohemian Estates offered the Crown of Bohemia to Frederick of the Palatinate, rather than Holy Roman Emperor Ferdinand II, a Catholic. Most of the Empire remained neutral, viewing it as an inheritance dispute, and the revolt was quickly suppressed. However, with neither Ferdinand nor Frederick prepared to back down, Imperial forces invaded the Palatinate; removal of a hereditary prince changed the nature and extent of the war.

Other Protestant powers became involved, among them king James, king of England and Scotland, whose daughter Elizabeth was Frederick's wife. In May 1620, king James of England decided to support toward Frederick V, his son-in-law, by allowing count Dohna, a Palatine envoy, to recruit volunteers at his own cost. The envoy started to levy around 10,000 bodies of London citizens, and appointed Horace Vere, 1st Baron Vere of Tilbury as commander. Protestant states within the Empire saw it as a threat, including external powers who held Imperial territories; Nassau-Dillenburg was a hereditary possession of the Dutch Prince of Orange, while Christian IV of Denmark was also Duke of Holstein.

This escalation coincided with the end of the Twelve Years' Truce between the Dutch Republic and Spain, and provided an opportunity for the Kingdom of France, which faced a series of Spanish-backed Huguenot rebellions. The situation worsened for Ferdinand, when, during Frederick's ascension, Gabriel Bethlen of Hungary launched an anti-Habsburg campaign in Hungary in the name of the Protestant cause. Later, both Frederick V and Bethlen further communicated with Bohemian rebels to resist the Habsburg.

The Spanish empire sent its Army of Flanders, consisting of roughly 20,000 personnel under the command of Don Ambrosio Spinola. In August 1620, Spinola entered the Lower Palatinate through Brussels, joining the Catholic campaign.

== Campaign ==
In 1620 the Spanish commander Don Ambrosio Spinola adopted Fabian strategy, in the hope of wearing the enemy out, until the approach of winter compelled the English and their allies to seek quarters. Horace Vere divided his troops among the three most important strongholds of the Palatinate. He himself occupied Mannheim, Sir Gerard Herbert was stationed in Heidelberg Castle, while Sir John Burroughs defended Frankenthal. On the next to last day of August, after an ominous week of feints and marches along the Rhine, Ambrogio Spinola marched an Imperial army of 24,000 men into the Lower Palatinate.

In September, Carlos Coloma besieged and captured Kreuznach. After this, Coloma captured Oppenheim, the city that guarded the entrance to the heart of the Palatinate. On 23 September, Spinola consulted with the Spanish commanders, Don Carlos Coloma, Don Gonzalo Fernández de Córdoba, Don Diego Felípez de Guzmán, and Hendrik van den Bergh regarding the next movement. They suggested moving against Heidelberg, Frankenthal, or Bacharach, and Spinola decided to attack Bacharach. Coloma then marched and manage to capture Bacharach, and the Bergstrasse district. Spinola managed to force the Protestant Union to sign the Treaty of Ulm in 1620, as Tilly continued the campaign.

In early 1621, after the Protestant Union broke up, The English governors were pessimistic about the war. Mainz fell to Córdoba in August 1621, while Spinola besieged Jülich from on 4 September.; The city surrendered in February 1622, cutting the supply route between the Dutch Republic and the Upper Palatinate. Having secured Jülich, Van den Bergh sent detachments to occupy the rest of the duchy. Then, while Spinola re-crossed the Meuse with his troops back to the Brabant, the Count garrisoned his army in the duchy for the duration of the winter. Although the capture of the town did not open a way for the Spanish Army to invade the Republic, it allowed their troops to be fed at the expense of a neutral territory. Moreover, the Republic had spent large sums of money over the previous twelve years to keep and strengthen Jülich's defenses.

In March, Johann Tserclaes, Count of Tilly, and the army of the Catholic League invaded from Bavaria; Meanwhile, The garrison under Sir Horace Vere at Mannheim received a visit early in 1622 from the dethroned Frederick, who had promised them a diversion. The Protestant forces under the Margrave of Baden-Durlach and Ernst von Mansfeld manage to intercept the Catholic forces at the Battle of Mingolsheim on Wiesloch 27 April. Following that, Mansfeld then moved onto Ladenburg, while the Margrave pursued the Bavarians; unaware Tilly had linked up with Córdoba, on 8 May, at Wimpfen, where after hours of deadlock and wagon fort battle, the Catholic forces manage to win the battle. After the battle, the Margrave's army disintegrated and Mansfeld retreated to Haguenau. However, further operations were then halted by disease.

In June, General Tilly continued his campaign and prevailed again at the Battle of Höchst, where he opposed by Christian the Younger of Brunswick. Then Tilly proceed to subdue the fortified towns of the Electoral Palatinate one by one. Meanwhile, after his defeat in Höchst, Frederick cancelled the contract of the Protestant forces under his lead, which they were then hired by the Dutch Republic to lift the siege of Bergen-op-Zoom.

By early November, Imperial-Spanish forces laying siege on Heidelberg. The city's status as the most important center of Calvinist theology and philosophy came to an end after being overrun by Tilly force. After 11 weeks of resistance, Heidelberg fell on 19 September 1622, as Gerard Herbert slain in battle.

After the capture of Heidelberg, the Catholic army continue their march to Mannheim, where they swiftly capture the city. Frederick fled into exile in the United Provinces. The Spanish occupied the western part of the Palatinate, cementing their control of the strategic corridor known as the Spanish Road; Maximilian of Bavaria took the rest. After their victory in Battle of Fleurus, The Catholic league diverting some of their forces from Fleurus to assist Spinola in the siege of Bergen-op-Zoom. After the Protestant left isolated after defeats elsewhere, in March 1623, King James instructed them to retreat and ending the English operation.

== Aftermath ==
James' instructions to De Vere were based on the assumption he had agreed to a deal with Philip IV to restore Frederick to his possessions, but this proved not to be the case. In February 1623, Ferdinand removed Frederick as one of the seven Imperial Prince-electors, his vote going to Maximilian of Bavaria.

On 6 August, Tilly defeated a Protestant army under Christian of Brunswick in the Battle of Stadtlohn, and Frederick signed an armistice with Ferdinand, ending the "Palatine Phase" of the Thirty Years' War. Ferdinand declared Bohemia a hereditary Habsburg possession, confiscated land from the Protestant nobles who led the revolt, and embarked on a Catholic Counter-Reformation. This ensured the war would continue, and in 1624, England, France, the Dutch Republic, Sweden, Denmark-Norway, the Duchy of Savoy, the Republic of Venice, and Brandenburg created an anti-Habsburg alliance. Frederick V also formally stripped from his Electoral Palatinate title. In recognition of his service during the Palatine conflict, Horrace Vere was appointed Master-General of the Ordnance for life On 16 February 1623, and he became a member of the Council of War on 20 July 1624.

C. V. Wedgwood consider the Spanish and Dutch involvement in the campaign was a significant step in internationalising the war, while the removal of Frederick V from title prompts other Protestant princes began discussing armed resistance to preserve their own rights and territories. Spanish occupation of Palatinate wouldn't end until 1652 (after Peace of Westphalia), due to the pressures from Franco-Spanish War.

== Sources ==
- Black, Jeremy (2002). European Warfare, 1494-1660 (Warfare and History). Routledge. ISBN 978-0415275316.
- Brennan C. Pursell (2003). The Winter King: Frederick V of the Palatinate and the Coming of the Thirty Years' War. Routledge. ISBN 978-0-7546-3401-0
- Charles Ingrao (2019). The Habsburg Monarchy, 1618-1815 (Hardcover). Cambridge University Press. ISBN 9781108499255.
- Eduardo de Mesa (2014). The Irish in the Spanish Armies in the Seventeenth Century. Boydell & Brewer, Boydell Press. ISBN 978-1-84383-951-4. JSTOR 10.7722/j.ctt6wp8jf.
- Guthrie, William P (2001). Battles of the Thirty Years War: From White Mountain to Nordlingen, 1618-1635. Greenwood Press. ISBN 978-0-313-32028-6.
- Hayden, J Michael (1973). "Continuity in the France of Henry IV and Louis XIII: French Foreign Policy, 1598-1615". The Journal of Modern History. 45 (1): 1–23. doi:10.1086/240888. JSTOR 1877591. S2CID 144914347.
- Israel, Jonathan Irvine (1997). Conflicts of empires: Spain, the low countries and the struggle for world supremacy, 1585–1713. Hambledon Press. ISBN 9780826435538.
- Josef V. Polišenský/Frederick Snider: War and society in Europe (1618-1648). Bristol: Cambridge University Press, 1978. ISBN 978-0-521-21659-3
- Lawrence, David R (2008). The Complete Soldier: Military Books and Military Culture in Early Stuart England, 1603-1645. Brill. ISBN 978-90-04-17079-7.
- Le Clerc, Jean (1728). Histoire des Provinces Unies des Pays-Bas (in French). Vol. II. Wentworth Press. ISBN 0274649519.
- Mark Grossman (2007). World Military Leaders A Biographical Dictionary. Facts On File, Incorporated. ISBN 9780816074778.
- Pursell, Brennan C (2003). The Winter King: Frederick V of the Palatinate and the Coming of the Thirty Years' War. Ashgate. ISBN 978-0-7546-3401-0.
- Sallengre, Albert-Henri (1728). Essai d'une histoire des Provinces-Unies, pour l'année MDCXXI.: Où la trêve finit, & la guerre recommença avec l'Espagne (in French). Thomas Johnson. ISBN 1178774368.
- Simon Adams (1997). The Thirty Years' War (Paperback). Routledge. ISBN 978-0-415-12883-4.
- Spielvogel, Jackson (2006). Western Civilization: Volume II, post 1500. Wadsworth Publishing. ISBN 978-0-534-64604-2.
- Sunshine, Glenn S. (2005) Ron Hill The Reformation for Armchair Theologians. Westminster John Knox Press ISBN 978-0-664-22815-6
- Wedgwood, C.V. (1938). The Thirty Years War (2005 ed.). New York Review of Books. ISBN 978-1-59017-146-2.
- Wilson, Peter H. (2009). Europe's Tragedy: A History of the Thirty Years War. Allen Lane. ISBN 978-0-7139-9592-3.
