= Siege of Heidelberg (1622) =

1622 battle of the Thirty Years' War

Coordinates: 49°25′N 08°43′E

- Part of the Palatinate phase of the Thirty Years' War
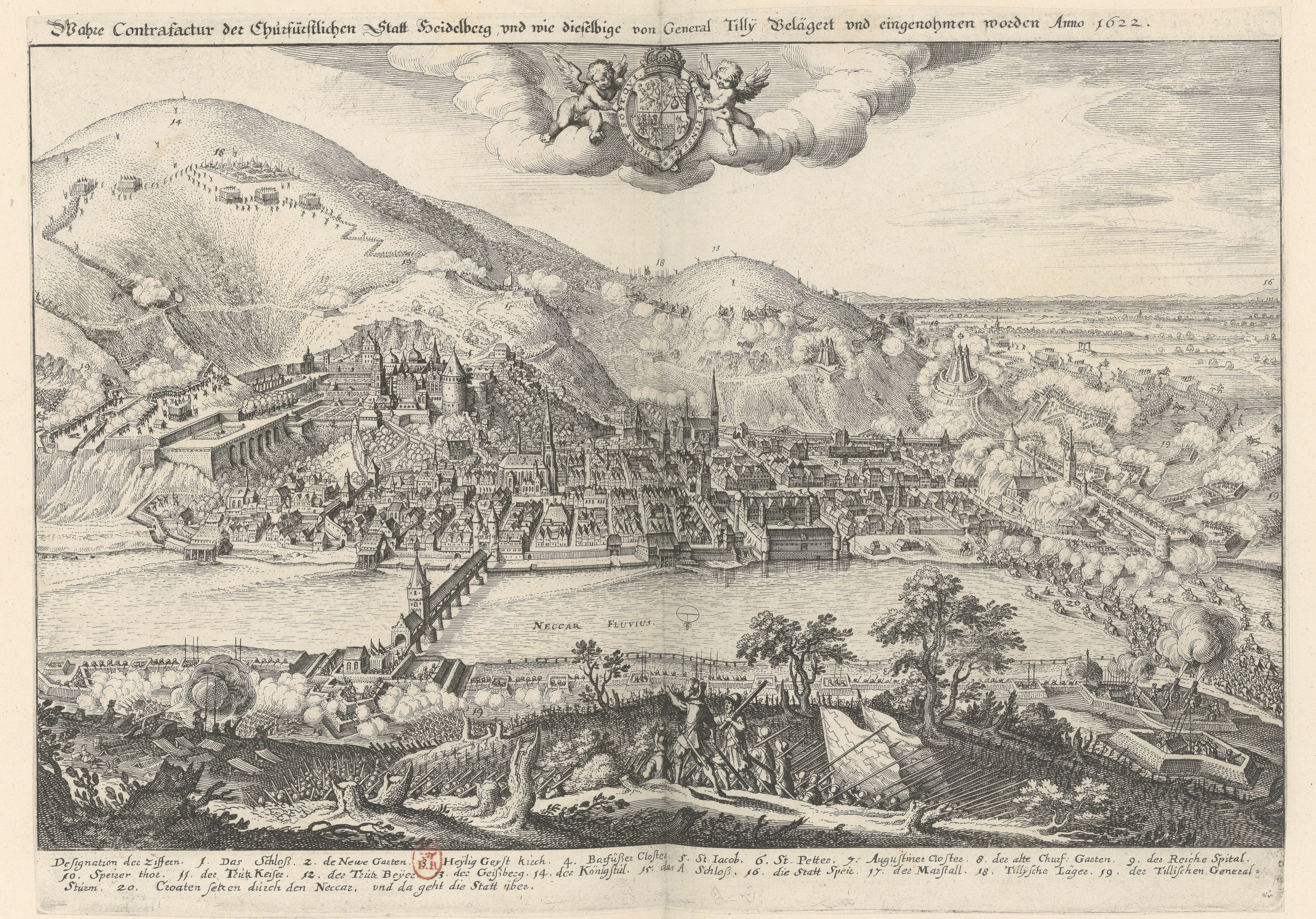
- View of Heidelberg
Date	23 July – 19 September 1622
Location	Heidelberg, Electorate of the Palatinate (present-day Baden-Württemberg, Germany)
Result	Spanish-Imperial victory

Belligerents
Electoral Palatinate; Kingdom of England	Holy Roman Empire; Catholic League (Spain) Spanish Empire

Commanders and leaders
(England) Gerard Herbert † (England) Horace Vere (England) John Burroughs	Count of Tilly (Spain) Gonzalo Fernández de Córdoba

Strength
Approx: 15,000–21,000	Approx: 22,000–30,000

Casualties and losses
Unknown: 8,000	Unknown: 5,000
- Location within Baden-Württemberg Heidelberg (Germany)

The siege of Heidelberg or the Imperial-Spanish capture of Heildelberg took place from 23 July to 19 September 1622, at Heidelberg, Electorate of the Palatinate, between the Imperial-Spanish army led by Johan Tzerclaes, Count of Tilly and Don Gonzalo Fernández de Córdoba against the Anglo-Protestant forces of Frederick V, Elector Palatine, commanded by Sir Gerard Herbert and Sir Horace Vere during the Palatinate campaign, in the context of the Thirty Years' War. On 16 September the city of Heidelberg was taken by storm, and the Heidelberg Castle surrendered three days later to the Imperial and Spanish forces.

== Background ==
In 1620 the Spanish commander Don Ambrosio Spinola adopted Fabian tactics in the hope of wearing the enemy out, until the approach of winter compelled the English and their allies to seek quarters. Sir Horace Vere divided his troops among the three most important strongholds of the Palatinate. He himself occupied Mannheim, Sir Gerard Herbert he stationed in Heidelberg Castle, while Sir John Burroughs undertook to defend Frankenthal.

Early in 1621 the Protestant Union was broken up, and the English garrisons had to give up all hope of relief. The English governors were not closely pressed that year. The garrison under Sir Horace Vere at Mannheim received a visit early in 1622 from the dethroned Frederick V, Elector Palatine, who had promised them a diversion, and who, in conjunction with Ernst von Mansfeld, had inflicted a momentary check upon the Imperialist army under Johan Tzerclaes, Count of Tilly, at Wiesloch (April). A few weeks later, however, the Count of Tilly, having been reinforced by the Spanish army of Don Gonzalo Fernández de Córdoba, inflicted defeats on the Protestants, capturing a large number of German towns held by Protestants, and in June, Frederick V had finally to leave Mannheim.

== Siege of Heidelberg ==
The combined Protestant forces, now numbering 25,000 strong, positioned themselves on the western bank of the Rhine and ceased challenging the invasion of the Palatinate. The English garrisons were now surrounded by a force of Imperialists and Spaniards under Tilly and Córdoba. Heidelberg came under siege by the Imperial-Spanish forces. Vere resolved to hold out, though he knew that the military position was hopeless.

In July 1622 it was decided that the Protestant force under Mansfeld and Brunswick should instead march through the Netherlands to lift the siege of Bergen-op-Zoom. When the Spanish learned of the move, Córdoba was hastily recalled to intercept them. He did so in the bloody Battle of Fleurus on August 29, but the siege of Bergen still had to be aborted.

After 11 weeks of resistance, Heidelberg fell on 19 September 1622.

The English commander of the Protestant forces, Sir Gerard Herbert, was mortally wounded during the siege.

== Aftermath ==
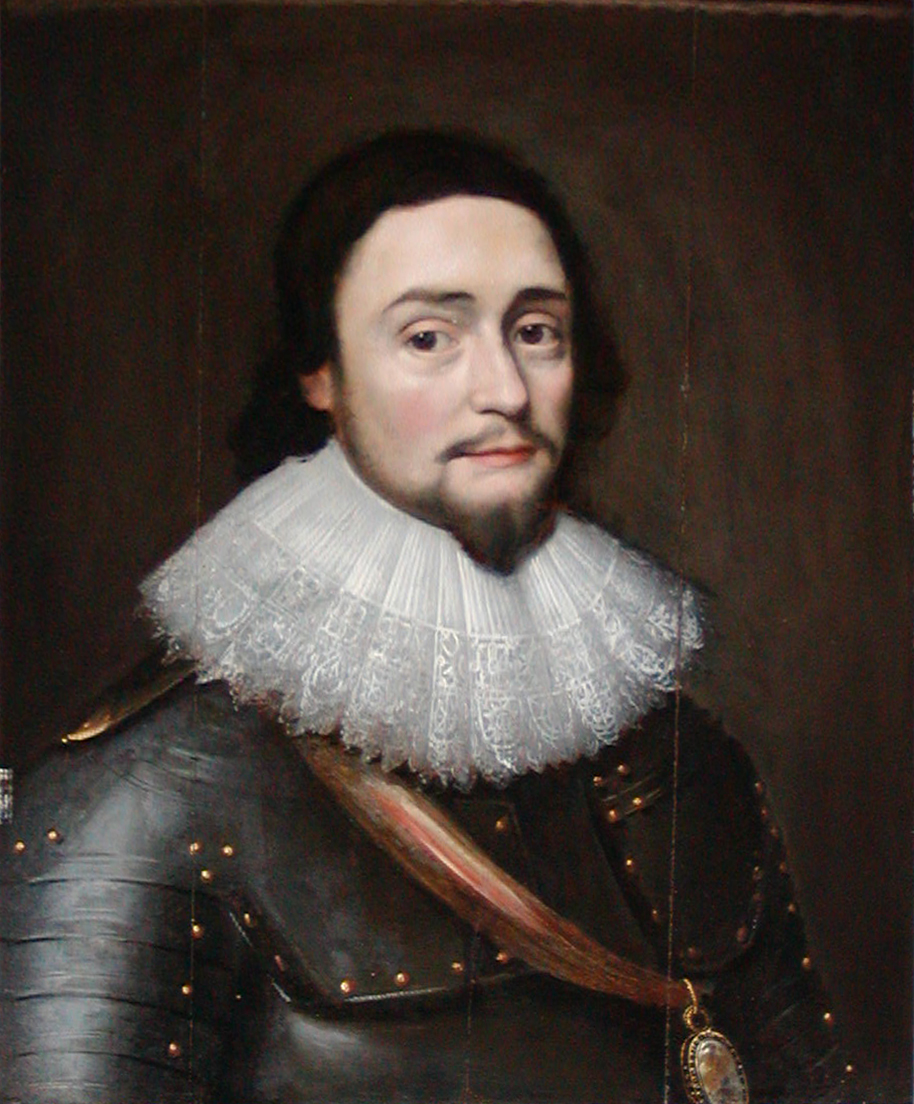
Frederick V of the Palatinate by Michiel van Mierevelt.

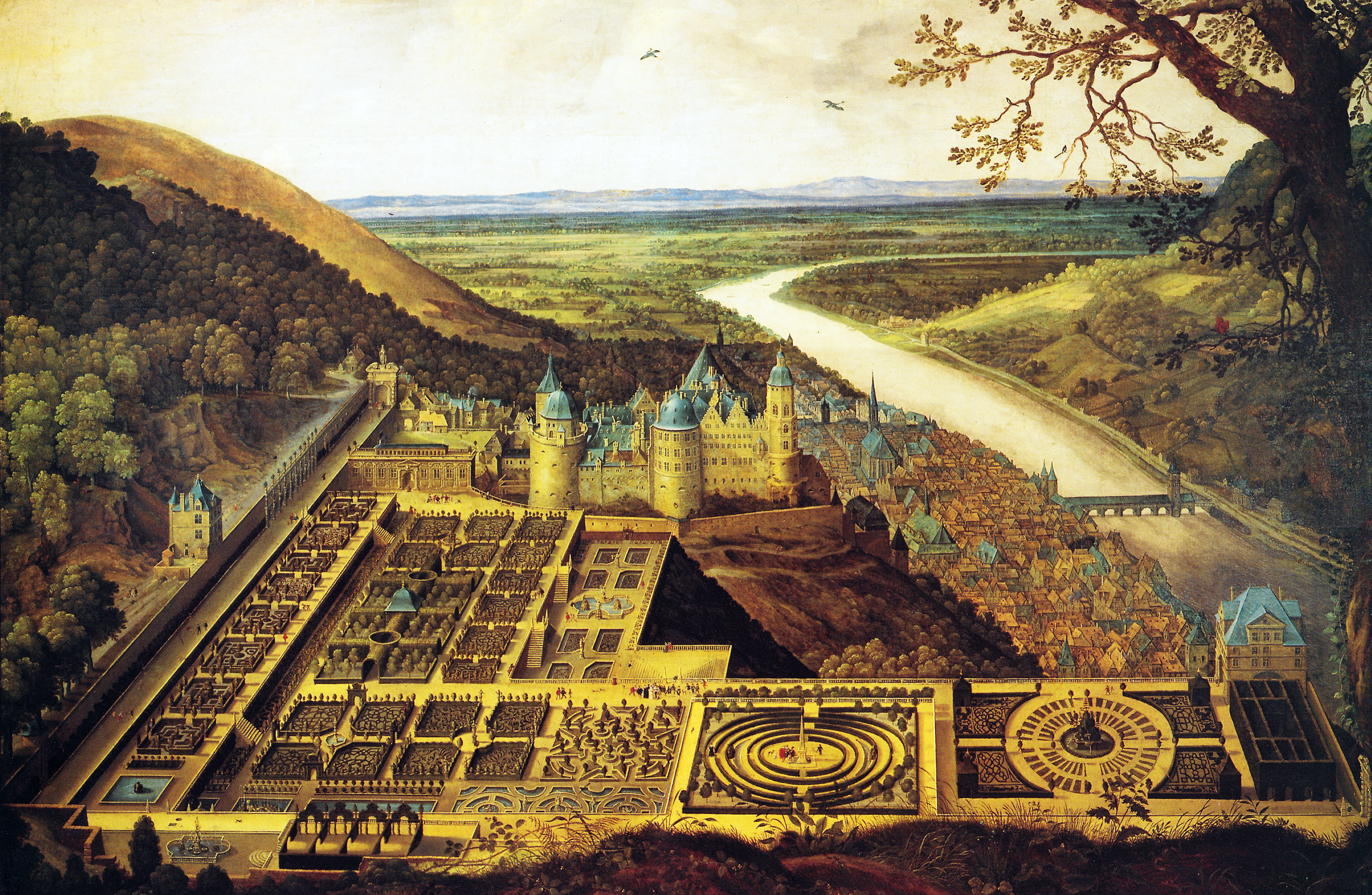
Heidelberg Castle and the Hortus Palatinus commissioned by Frederick V, and designed by the English gardener Inigo Jones and the French engineer Salomon de Caus.

The progress of the Spanish was unstoppable, and after the fall of Heidelberg, and the unsuccessful Protestant defense at Mannheim, the Spanish army captured the town. Finally, the defensive Anglo-Protestant forces under Sir Horace Vere, after a futile struggle, were defeated and capitulated.

Only Frankenthal remained loyal to Frederick V, Elector Palatine, defended by the forces of Sir John Burroughs, but was taken one year later by the Spanish troops, thus leaving the Electorate of the Palatinate in the hands of the Spaniards.

== See also ==
- Electorate of the Palatinate
- Battle of Stadtlohn
