= Battle of Bamberg =

1632 battle of the Thirty Years' War

- Part of the Thirty Years' War
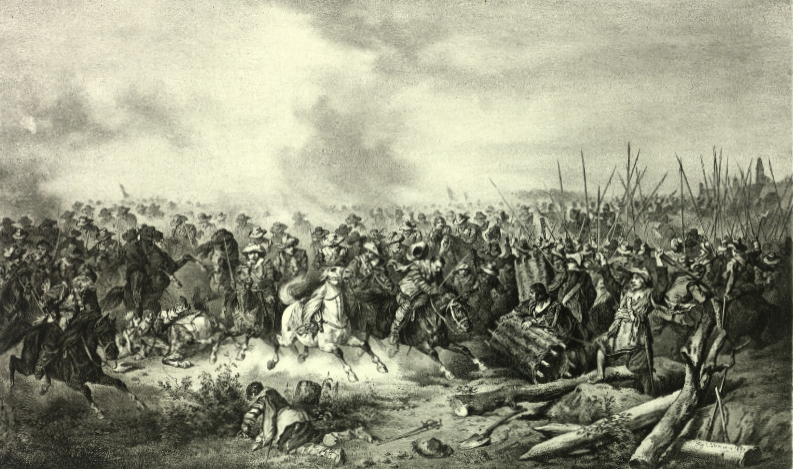
- Retreat of the Swedish regiments in the battle of Bamberg, 28. February 1632 (by Siegmund L’Allemand, 1865)
Date	9 March 1632
Location	Bamberg, Prince-Bishopric of Bamberg, Franconian Circle, Holy Roman Empire
Result	Catholic victory

Belligerents
Catholic League	Swedish Empire

Commanders and leaders
Count of Tilly	(Swedish Empire) Gustav Horn (Swedish Empire) Heinrich of Solms-Laubach (DOW)

Strength
22,000	12,000

Casualties and losses
Unknown	900–4,500 (Note: Horn's reporter, Heussner, stated 900 Swedish casualties, while Imperial sources claimed 1,500 lost at the bridges and a further 300–500 during the retreat, four cannons, and baggage. Tilly estimated 4,500 total Swedish losses.)

The Battle of Bamberg took place on 9 March 1632 during the Thirty Years' War. The army of the Catholic League led by Count Tilly surprised and routed the Swedes led by Gustav Horn and captured the city.

== Background ==
After his victory at the Battle of Breitenfeld, the Swedish king Gustavus Adolphus conquered large parts of northern and central Germany in 1631. The troops of the Emperor and of the Catholic League were pushed back to Westphalia, Bavaria and Austria. The bulk of the Swedish army wintered around Mainz, where Gustavus Adolphus had set up his headquarters.

Part of the Swedish army under General Horn remained active and conquered several places in Franconia. He had only two Swedish regiments, the rest of his 12,000 troops being German recruits. On 10 February Horn captured the episcopal city of Bamberg, the capital of the Prince-Bishopric of the same name. The defense of the city was left to the civilians and militia of the prince-bishopric, because the professional units of the Catholic League had fled the city. After a siege of only nine hours, the city's defenders surrendered to the Swedes as they ran out of ammunition.

== Battle ==
The Catholic League led by Count Tilly began its counterattack in March. Tilly gathered the garrisons from the Upper Palatinate and added 8,000 men of the Bavarian militia to his army. From Nördlingen he marched with his army to Bamberg, arriving on the evening of 9 March. The vanguard raided the Swedish cavalry posts outside the city. The fleeing cavalrymen caused panic among the defenders in the eastern part of Bamberg. The League army broke through the defenses at the Monastery of the Holy Sepulchre. The eastern part of the city with unfinished trenches was quickly abandoned by the defenders, but the bridge over the Regnitz which gave access to the center was fiercely defended. When two of Horn's regiments managed to completely recapture the bridge, Tilly ordered two heavy guns to be placed in a beer garden overlooking the bridge. After a shelling, the bridge had to be abandoned. The Swedish commander, the Count of Solms-Laubach, died from the injuries sustained during the shelling. The fighting lasted until midnight, after which the Swedish army gave up the defence. Horn lost a third of his men, mainly through desertion, and withdrew to Schweinfurt.

== Aftermath ==
Count Tilly was too weak to further exploit his success in Bamberg. Gustavus Adolphus needed another victory after the Swedish defeat to convince his various German allies, such as Württemberg, to continue supporting Sweden. The king marched from Mainz to Nuremberg, absorbing Horn's remnants. On March 31, Gustavus Adolphus arrived in Nuremberg, where he was welcomed as a hero. A week later he captured Donauwörth and gathered enough men to invade Bavaria.
