= Horace Vere, 1st Baron Vere of Tilbury =

English army officer (1565–1635)

The Right Honourable The Lord Vere of Tilbury
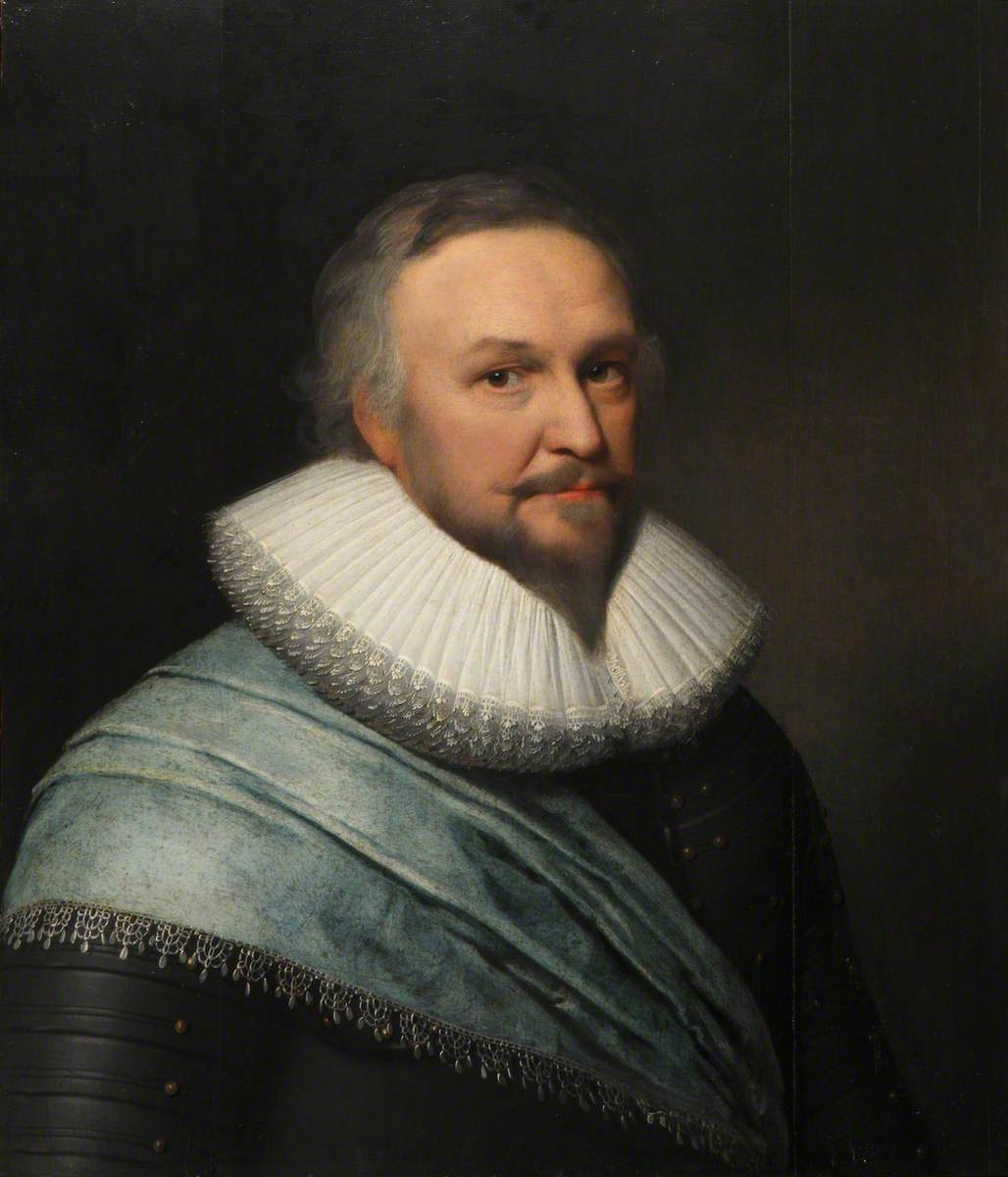
- Portrait by Michiel Jansz. van Mierevelt

Personal details
- Born: 1565
- Died: 2 May 1635 (aged 69–70) Whitehall
- Resting place: Westminster Abbey
- Spouse: Mary Tracy
- Parents: Geoffrey Vere (father); Elizabeth Hardekyn (mother)
- Relatives: De Vere family

Military service
- Conflicts: Eighty Years War: Siege of Steenwijk (1592); Siege of Groningen (1594); Siege of Cádiz (1596); Battle of Nieuwpoort (1600); Thirty Years War: Palatinate campaign (1620–1623); Siege of Breda (1624)

Horace Vere, 1st Baron Vere of Tilbury (1565 – 2 May 1635) was an English army officer who served in the Eighty Years' War and the Thirty Years' War. A brother of Francis Vere, he was sent to the Electoral Palatinate by James VI and I in 1620. He was subsequently elevated to the peerage of England as "Baron Vere of Tilbury", which became extinct after he died without a male heir.

== Family ==
Horace Vere, born in 1565, was the fourth son of Geoffrey Vere of Crepping Hall, Essex, a younger son of John de Vere, 15th Earl of Oxford, and Elizabeth Trussell. His mother was Elizabeth Hardekyn (d. December 1615), daughter of Richard Hardekyn (d. 1558) of Wotton House near Castle Hedingham. He had three brothers, John Vere (c. 1558 – 1624) of Kirby Hall near Castle Hedingham, Sir Francis Vere (born c. 1560), and Robert Vere (b. 1562), and a sister, Frances Vere (born 1567), who married, as his second wife, the 'colonial adventurer and author', Sir Robert Harcourt (1574/5 – 1631), of Nuneham on 20 March 1598.

Horace Vere was a first cousin of the court poet and playwright Edward de Vere, 17th Earl of Oxford (1550–1604), Lord Great Chamberlain of England under Queen Elizabeth I, and possibly the model for the character of Hamlet's friend, "good Horatio".

== Military career ==
=== Anglo-Spanish War (1585-1604) ===
Vere left home in 1590 to join his two elder brothers, Robert and Sir Francis, in the Netherlands, commencing his service in the infantry company of the latter during his tenure of office as sergeant-major-general. He was wounded during the assault by English and Dutch soldiers on the fortress of Steenwijk on 5 July 1592, was recommended by his brother for a company at the siege of Groningen in June 1594, and was knighted for his gallantry at the siege of Cádiz in June 1596.

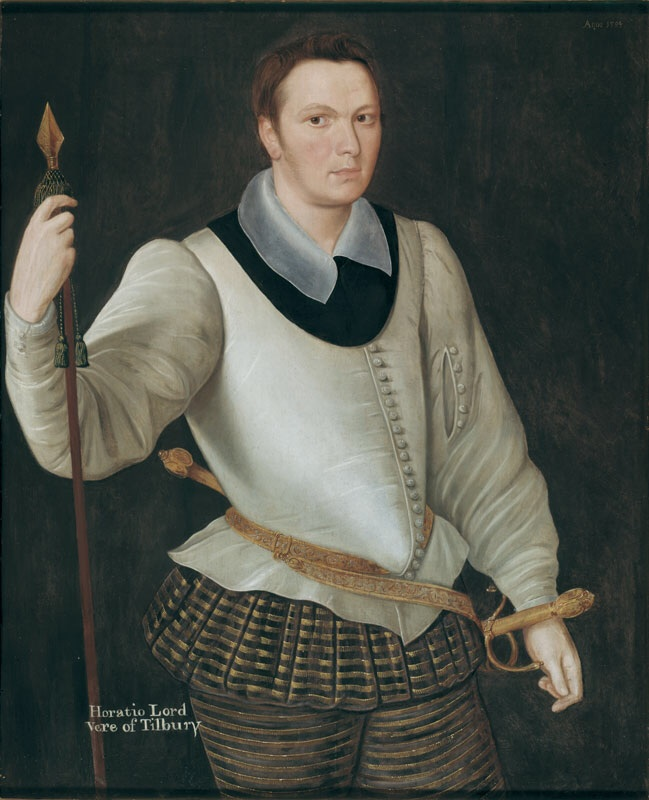
Horace Vere in 1594.

The following year Horace in his brothers absence took command in the field (albeit temporarily) of the English forces in the Netherlands. With Maurice of Orange they took Rheinberg, Meurs, Greonlo, Bredevoort, Enschede, Oldenzaal and Lingen; cities of the eastern Netherlands that created an important barrier.

He commanded three hundred foot at the battle of Nieuwpoort under his brother, after whose retirement from the field he helped Sir John Ogle and Sir Charles Fairfax to rally the English vanguard; and at the Siege of Ostend he took a conspicuous part in the repulse of the Spanish assault on 7 January 1602, being stationed (along with Fairfax) at a vital point in the defenses known as the 'Sandhill,' in command of twelve companies. He was badly hurt in the leg by a splinter. Horace then took to the field under his brother again in the spring of 1602 with Maurice's army, and after Francis was severely wounded in the head during the siege of Grave he then took over as command of English forces there. Early in April 1603 he was dispatched by his brother with a message to the new king.

Upon the retirement of Sir Francis Vere, Sir Horace took his place in the Netherlands, but at first only the senior of the four colonels of the English companies, the others being Ogle, Sir Edward Cecil, and Sir Edward Harwood.

The outset of Sir Horace's individual career in the Dutch States Army was marked by the fall of Ostend on 24 September 1604 to the Spanish general, Ambrosio Spinola. As a makeweight to Ostend, Maurice of Nassau, Prince of Orange meditated the recapture of Sluys. The Spanish general opposed the advance upon the town with a force of two thousand men strongly entrenched at Damme, situated between Sluys and Bruges. This force, under the Spanish general of horse, Don Luis de Velasco, had to be dislodged, a risky operation. Vere won for his command the approbation of the States-General. In July 1604 Spinola was foiled in an attempt to relieve the town, and on 20 August it was surrendered.

=== Dutch service ===
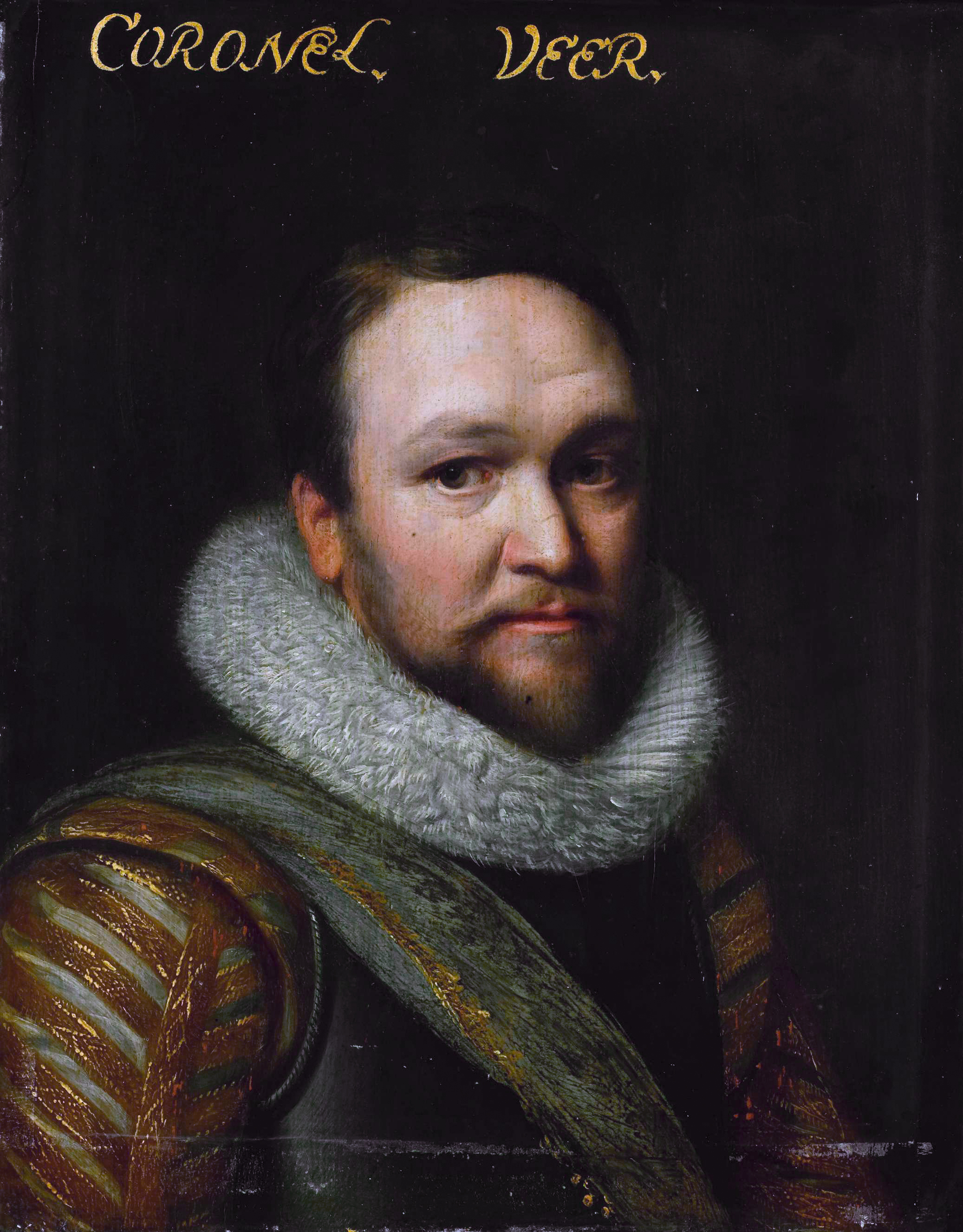
1st Baron Vere of Tilbury in Holland by Michiel Jansz. van Mierevelt

At the battle of Mülheim on 9 October 1605 the cavalry were completely outmanoeuvred, and several of the troops broke. Vere crossed the river with four companies of infantry and kept the Spaniards at bay for over an hour, while the other forces had time to rally and retreat in some order.

The battle of Mülheim was followed by Vere's return to England, and by his marriage in 1607. Two years later came the twelve years' truce between the United Provinces and Spain. In October 1609 Sir Horace succeeded his brother as governor of the Brill. In 1609 he was promised the reversion of the mastership of ordnance, after Lord Carew.

In 1610 he served at the siege of Juliers under Sir Edward Cecil. In 1616 he yielded up the cautionary town of Brielle to the Dutch on the repayment by them of the loans received from England, receiving a life pension of £800 in compensation for his loss of the governorship. Two years later Sir Horace received from Maurice the governorship of Utrecht. He had previously aided the prince in disarming and suppressing the provincial levies, raised on behalf of Johan van Oldenbarnevelt.

=== Palatinate campaign ===
In May 1620, James I was being strongly urged by popular opinion to defend the Protestant cause of his son-in-law, Frederick V, Elector Palatine. He allowed Count Dohna, the Palatine envoy, to levy a body of volunteers at his own cost, and to appeal for funds. Dohna, as paymaster, selected Sir Horace Vere, as commander; Buckingham had wanted the post for Sir Edward Cecil, and withdrew support from the expedition.

News arrived of the treaty of Ulm (23 June), between the union of Catholic princes and the League, preparing the way for a Catholic invasion of the Palatinate, and money came in more rapidly. On 9 July, Vere went to Theobalds to take leave of the king, and on 22 July the regiment, 2,200 strong, set sail from Gravesend to the Netherlands, to be escorted south into Germany and to the seat of war by a body of Dutch cavalry. By this time Vere was a professional soldier, even-tempered, brave and popular. The Earl of Essex was one of his lieutenants. Spinola was in the field with one army, Velasco on the way with another.

Vere's plan was to effect a junction with the Protestant force near Mannheim, under the Margrave of Ansbach. He marched through Wesel into the neighbourhood of Coblenz, and then made a detour by a route through the Taunus, on the other side of which, in the valley of the Main River, Spinola made an unsuccessful attempt to cut him off. Vere crossed the Main by a ford, near Frankfurt, and then, by way of Darmstadt and Bensheim (there resting his troops), and proceeded to Worms, where the junction of forces actually took place.

Spinola now adopted Fabian tactics in the hope of wearing the enemy out, until the approach of winter compelled the English and their allies to seek quarters. Vere divided his troops among the three most important strongholds of the Palatinate. He himself occupied Mannheim, Gerard Herbert he stationed in Heidelberg Castle, while Sir John Burroughs undertook to defend Frankenthal.

Early in 1621, the Protestant Union was broken up, and the English garrisons had to give up all hope of relief. The English governors were not closely pressed that year. The garrison under Vere at Mannheim received a visit early in 1622 from the dethroned elector, who had promised them a diversion, and who, in conjunction with Mansfelt, had inflicted a momentary check upon the imperialist army under Johann Tserclaes von Tilly at Wiesloch (April). A few weeks later, however, Tilly, having been reinforced by Gonzalo Fernández de Córdoba, inflicted defeats on the Protestants, and in June the elector had finally to leave Mannheim.

The English garrisons were now surrounded and threatened by a force of imperialists and Spaniards under Tilly, Cordova, and Verdugo. Vere resolved to hold out, though he knew that the military position was hopeless. On 16 September, the town of Heidelberg was taken by storm, and the castle surrendered three days later. Sir Gerard Herbert had received a mortal wound during the siege. At Mannheim Vere, with a garrison of fourteen hundred men, without money or supplies, had to defend extensive fortifications. He retired to the citadel, but no extraneous help being forthcoming, he was forced to capitulate at the close of September, and, having marched out with the honours of war, withdrew to The Hague. Vere's defence was commemorated by George Chapman

At Frankenthal, Burroughs did not surrender the place to Verdugo until 14 April 1623, and then only in response to direct orders from home.

The courage displayed by Vere against great odds was recognised in England, when the general returned early in February 1623, even if his salary and expenses were never paid in full by the treasury. On 16 February 1623, he was appointed master-general of the ordnance for life, and he became a member of the council of war on 20 July 1624. On the death of his elder brother, John, in the same year he became his residuary legatee, with the reversion of Tilbury and Kirby Hall upon the death of the widow.

=== Breda and the Brabant campaign ===
In 1624 Sir Horace Vere travelled once more to The Hague in order to second Prince Maurice in the defence of the fortress of Breda, under siege by Spinola from August. Maurice died on 23 April 1625. The only ways to approach the siege works from outside were by causeways. The new stadtholder, Maurice's brother, Frederick Henry, Prince of Orange, resolved to attempt the causeways, and Vere was selected to conduct this hazardous operation. Taking with him some six thousand men, including three hundred pikemen led by his kinsman, Robert de Vere, 19th Earl of Oxford, Vere started an hour before the dawn on the morning of 13 May 1625. The English marched along the dyke, and after a sharp engagement captured the redoubt. Spinola thereupon sent strong reinforcements to the threatened point, and, incurring a very heavy loss, the English were forced to retire. On his return to England that summer Vere, high in military reputation, was created Baron Vere of Tilbury.

His next enterprise in the Netherlands was in connection with the siege of 's-Hertogenbosch, one of the chief military positions in Brabant, undertaken by Prince Frederic Henry in April 1629. Sir Edward Vere (born ca. 1580), the illegitimate son of Horatio's first cousin Edward, Earl of Oxford, was mortally wounded in the lines on 18 August a few weeks before the place was finally surrendered. A large number of Englishmen who were afterwards distinguished soldiers served under Vere in the trenches at Den Bosch. Among them were: Thomas Fairfax and Philip Skippon, the future organisers of the New Model Army; Jacob Astley, Thomas Glemham, the future royalist generals; Sir John Borlase, and Henry Hexham, the historian of the Dutch wars. Fairfax, Skippon, and George Monck, particularly, were his pupils in the art of war.

The services of the Veres in the Netherlands were closed by the Capture of Maastricht May–August 1632. Vere commanded a powerful brigade, and posted his headquarters opposite the Brussels Gate. Among those killed during the operations were Vere's kinsman, Robert de Vere, 19th Earl of Oxford, while among the wounded were his nephew, Sir Simon Harcourt, and Sir Thomas Holles.

== Death ==
After the surrender of Maastricht, Vere returned to England. While dining with Sir Harry Vane, The Hague envoy and his diplomatic friend, at Whitehall on 2 May 1635, he was seized with an apoplectic fit and died within two hours. He was buried with military pomp on 8 May in Westminster Abbey, where the same tomb serves for him and his brother, Sir Francis.

== Marriage and issue ==
Vere married, in October 1607, Mary Tracy (1581-1671), daughter of Sir John Tracy (d.1591) of Toddington, Gloucestershire, and widow of William Hoby, by whom she had two children. With his death the barony of Vere of Tilbury became extinct. Vere left five daughters, who were his coheirs:

1. Elizabeth Vere, who married John Holles, 2nd Earl of Clare, grandfather of the first Duke of Newcastle;
2. Mary Vere, who married, first, Sir Roger Townshend, Baronet, of Raynham in Norfolk, whence are descended the Marquises of Townshend, and secondly, Mildmay Fane, 2nd Earl of Westmorland;
3. Catherine Vere, who married, first, Oliver St John (1612/1613–November 1641 or 1642), son of Sir John St John, 1st Baronet, and Anne Leighton: and, secondly, John Poulett, 2nd Baron Poulett;
4. Anne Vere, who married Sir Thomas Fairfax (afterwards 3rd Baron Fairfax of Cameron); and
5. Dorothy Vere, who married John Wolstenholme, eldest son of Sir John Wolstenholme, bart., of Nostell, Yorkshire.
6. Susana Vere (1619–1623) Died at a young age.

Lady Vere continued to live at Clapton until the death of the widow of Lord Vere's eldest brother, John, when she succeeded to Kirby Hall, where she died on Christmas Eve 1670, aged 90. For a short while in the spring of 1645, after the death of the Countess of Dorset, the king's children, Elizabeth and Henry, Duke of Gloucester, were entrusted to her care. She was much in Parliament's favour; but (despite the handsome allowance) she transferred it to the Earl and Countess of Northumberland.

== Notes ==
Military offices
Preceded by The Earl of Totnes	Master-General of the Ordnance; 1629–1634	Succeeded by The Earl of Newport
Peerage of England
New creation	Baron Vere of Tilbury; 1625–1635	Extinct
