= Siege of Frankenthal =

1623 battle of the Thirty Years' War

- Part of the Palatinate phase of the Thirty Years' War
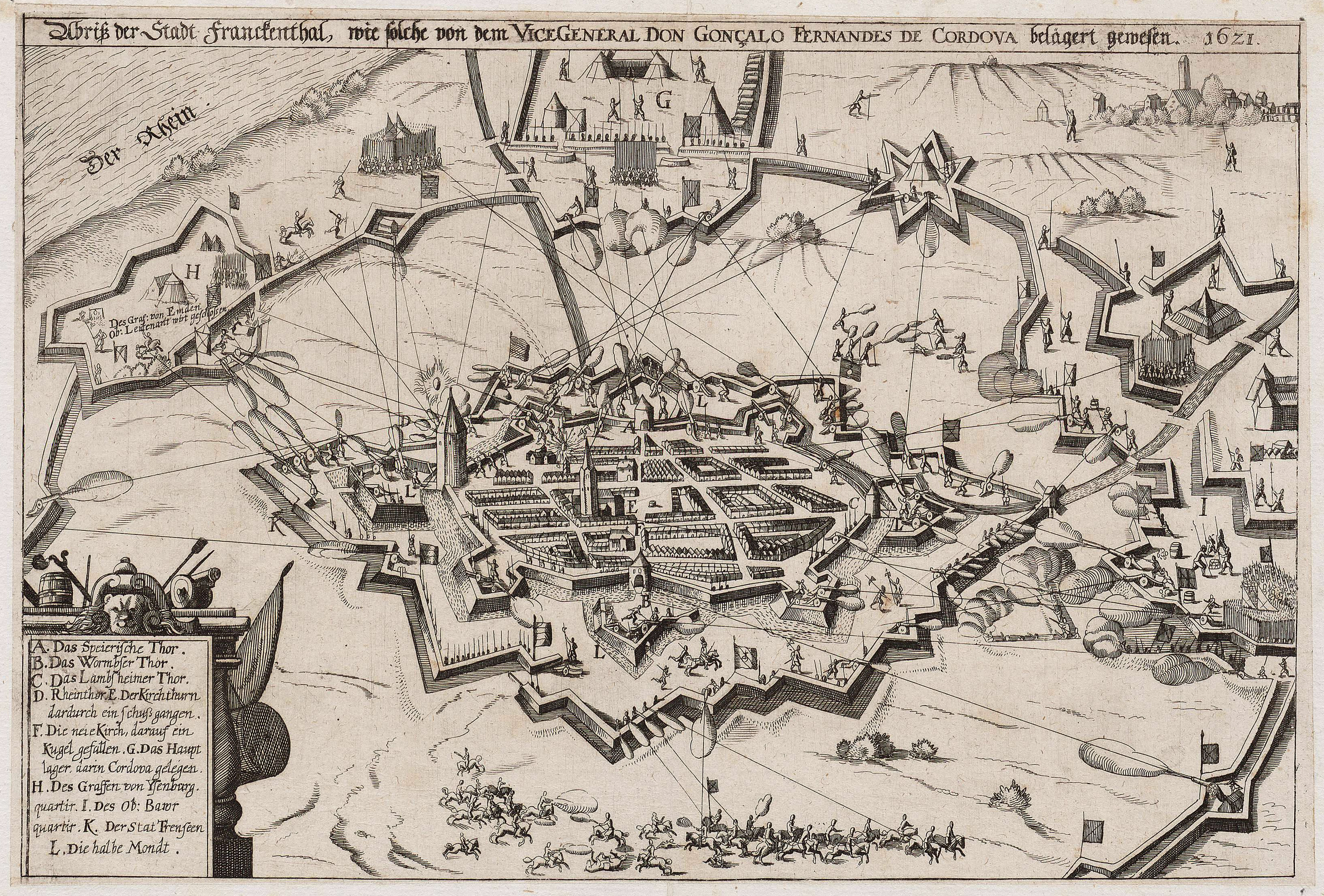
- 1625 engraving of the siege
Date	1621 – 20 March 1623
Location	Frankenthal, Electorate of Palatinate (present-day Germany) 49°32′00″N 8°21′00″E
Result	Imperial–Spanish victory

Belligerents
Electoral Palatinate; Kingdom of England	Holy Roman Empire; Spain

Commanders and leaders
(England) John Burroughs	(Spain) Gonzalo Fernandez de Cordoba
- Location within Rhineland-Palatinate Siege of Frankenthal (Germany)

The siege of Frankenthal was a siege of the Palatinate campaign during the Thirty Years' War. A Spanish army under Gonzalo Fernández de Córdoba besieged the Palatinate fortified city of Frankenthal and its mostly English garrison commanded by John Burroughs. The siege lasted from 1621 to 20 March 1623, when King James I ordered the city to surrender.

== Background ==
In the early seventeenth century, the city's fortifications were upgraded by Frederick IV, Elector Palatine in preparation for war. Frederick also refortified Heidelberg and created the fortress-city of Mannheim. Frankenthal had an important strategic role within the Electorate of the Palatinate.

On 23 May 1618 the Kingdom of Bohemia rose in revolt against Ferdinand II, Holy Roman Emperor and offered the crown to Frederick V, Elector Palatine, who, by accepting the Bohemian offer, brought the Electorate of the Palatinate into the war, thus broadening the conflict.
