= Siege of Meurs (1597) =

1597 conflict

- Part of the Eighty Years' War and the Anglo–Spanish War
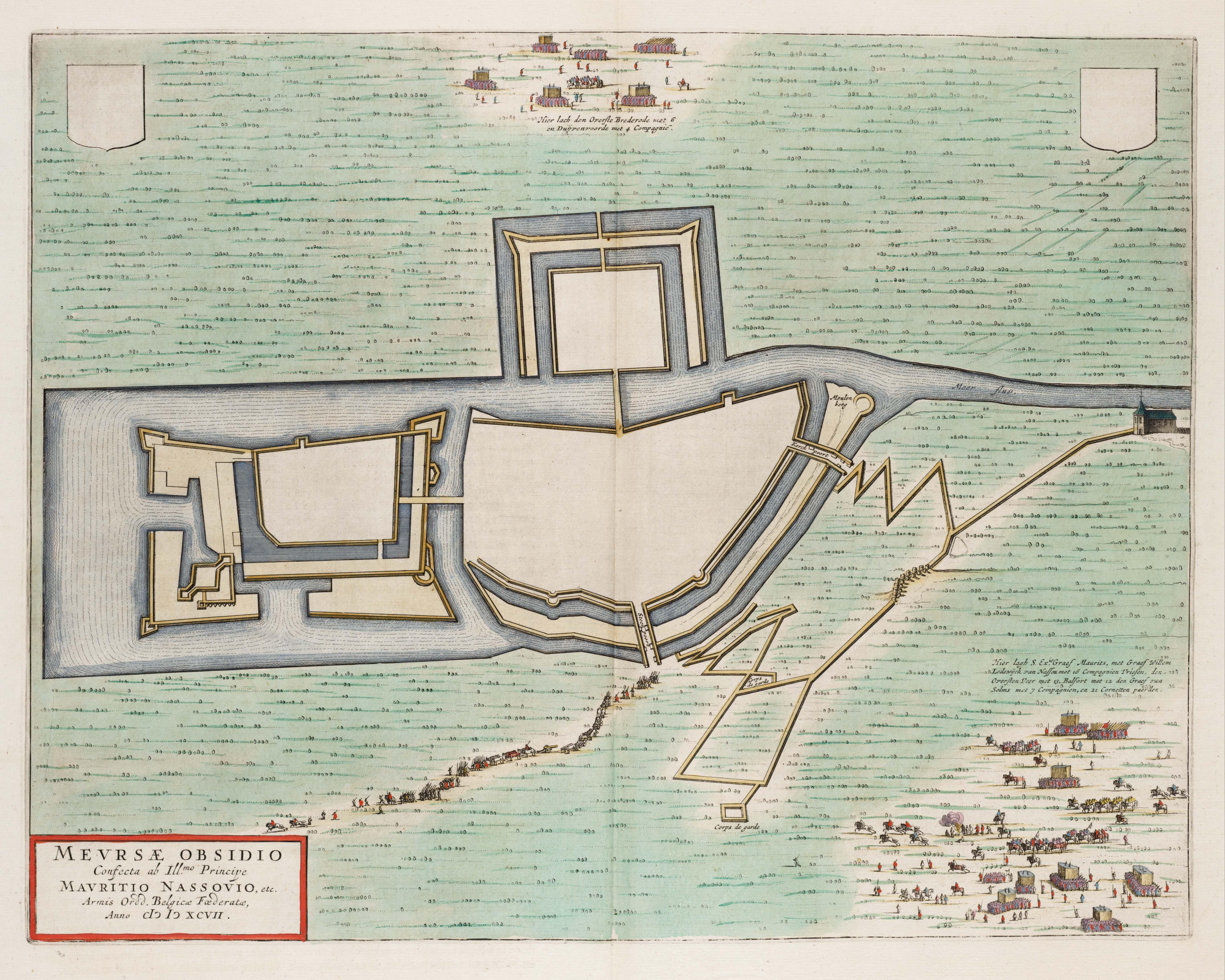
- Siege of Meurs from the Atlas Van Loon
Date	29 August – 3 September 1597
Location	Meurs (present-day Germany)
Result	Dutch & English victory

Belligerents
Dutch Republic; England	(Spain) Spanish Empire

Commanders and leaders
(Dutch Republic) Maurice of Orange (England) Horace Vere	(Spain) Andrés de Miranda

Strength
7,000 Infantry; 1,200 Cavalry	400

Casualties and losses
Unknown (low)	All captured

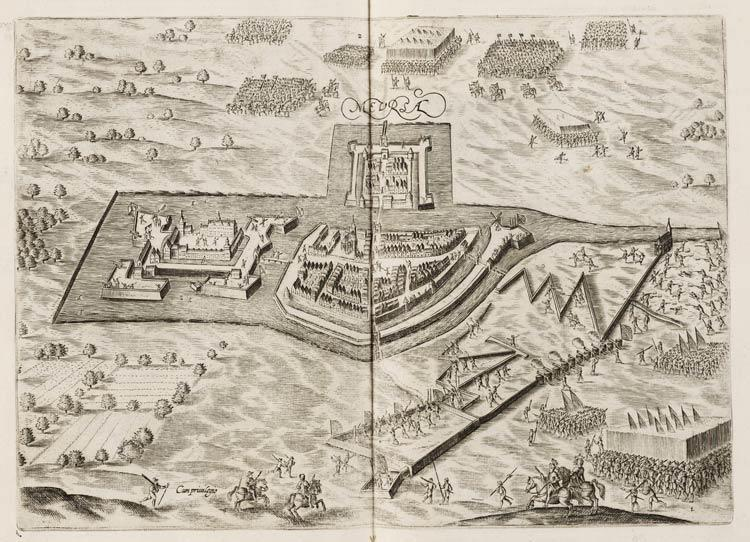
Siege of Meurs (Moers) by Maurice of Orange in 1597

The siege of Meurs took place between 29 August to 3 September 1597 during the Eighty Years' War and the Anglo–Spanish War. The Spanish occupied city of Moers (Dutch at the time: Meurs) under Governor Andrés de Miranda was besieged by Dutch and English troops under the command of Prince Maurice of Orange. The siege ended with the capitulation and the withdrawal of the Spanish garrison. The siege was part of Maurice's campaign of 1597 known as the Ten Glory Years, his highly successful offensive against the Spaniards.

== Background ==
Moers had been occupied by the governor of the Spanish Netherlands, Alexander Farnese, Duke of Parma, on 8 August 1586 and Colonel Sacchinus Camillo de Modiliana was made governor with a modest garrison. Halfway through 1597 the government at The Hague, with improved funding, ordered a new campaign for Maurice of Nassau, Prince of Orange, the commander of the Dutch and English troops, to oust the Spanish while they had been preoccupied with the siege of Amiens.

Maurice planned a campaign directly through the east of the Netherlands, where Grol and Oldenzaal were the strongest cities. On 1 August 1597 Maurice along with his cousin (and brother-in-law) William Louis left with 7000 infantry and 1200 cavalry which included thirteen companies of English and ten companies of Scots, both cavalry and infantry commanded by Colonel Horace Vere Maurice's first target was the important military and economic city of Rheinberg which for seven years had been under Spanish occupation. After a ten-day siege on 19 August the Spanish surrendered the city and Maurice then headed to the south, where Moers was located.

== Siege ==
Sitting on western bank of the Rhine, Moers consisted of a fortress with a castle, Herman van den Bergh, the governor of Spanish Upper Guelders, reinforced the city with additional troops which totaled 400 soldiers under the command of Andrés de Miranda.

Upon arrival Maurice then had Moers besieged from two sides, his batteries opened up on 29 August whilst the engineers had parts of the moat surrounding the city filled in at three places, so that the city could be stormed. Moers however offered little resistance to the Dutch and English; with parts of the wall crumbling and even before the attack was launched on 3 September, de Miranda negotiated for terms which Maurice accepted. Miranda surrendered the city and his men marched out with full honors and Maurice's troops then entered the city who then strengthened the fortifications and left a garrison.

On 8 September Maurice then marched to Orsoy, crossed over the Rhine, then over the Lippe and appeared on the evening of 11 September before Groenlo, which he then besieged for eleven days forcing the garrison to surrender.

== See also ==
- List of stadtholders in the Low Countries
- List of governors of the Spanish Netherlands
- Siege of Rheinberg (1597)
- Siege of Bredevoort (1597)
