= Mary Vere =

English letter writer

- Born: 1581
- Died: 24 December 1671 (aged 90)

Mary Vere (1581–1671) was an English letter writer.

== Background ==
She was born Mary Tracy, a daughter of Sir John Tracy (died 1591) of Toddington, Gloucestershire and his wife Anne, a daughter of Thomas Throckmorton (died 1568). Her brother Sir Thomas Tracy was a member of the household of Anne of Denmark, as an usher of her privy chamber.

== Career ==
She married firstly, William Hoby (died 1603). They had two children.

In October or November 1607, she married the veteran soldier Horace Vere.

Their children included:

- Elizabeth Vere, who married John Holles, 2nd Earl of Clare
- Mary Vere, who married, (1) Sir Roger Townshend of Raynham in Norfolk, (2) Mildmay Fane, 2nd Earl of Westmorland
- Catherine Vere, who married, (1) Oliver St John, (2) John Poulett, 2nd Baron Poulett
- Anne Vere, who married Sir Thomas Fairfax in 1637
- Dorothy Vere, who married John Wolstenholme, eldest son of Sir John Wolstenholme of Nostell, Yorkshire
- Susanna Vere (1619–1623)

Mary Vere was a Puritan. She wrote "God will provide" at the front of most of the books in her closet. In 1608 she donated a book to Sir Thomas Bodley's library, and asked that it be inscribed in Latin as a gift from the daughter of Sir John Tracy. A number of religious works were dedicated to her.

She was widowed in 1635. Mary Vere lived at Hackney. Her chaplain Samuel Rogers kept a diary. He much preferred her to Margaret Denny, the widow of Edward Denny, his previous patron.

== Death ==
At the death of the widow of Lord Vere's eldest brother, John Vere, she inherited Kirby Hall, where she died on Christmas Eve 1671, aged 90.
