= Treaty of Munich (1619) =

1619 treaty between Bavaria and the Holy Roman Empire

The Treaty of Munich was signed on 8 October 1619 in Munich between Holy Roman Emperor Ferdinand II and Duke Maximilian of Bavaria. Spanish ambassador Oñate persuaded Ferdinand to grant Maximilian any part of the Electorate of the Palatinate to occupy, as well as the Elector title of Frederick V. Moreover, Oñate exceeded his duties by guaranteeing Ferdinand Spanish support in dealing with the Bohemian rebels. Based on the terms of the treaty, Maximilian, leader of the Catholic League, made his Bavarian forces available to Emperor Ferdinand. In return, Maximilian was granted territories in the Palatine in order to maintain his forces.

== Sources ==
- Sutherland, N.M. The Origins of the Thirty Years War and the Structure of European Politics. Oxford University Press: The English Historical Review, Vol 107, No. 424, pp. 587–625, July 1992.

== See also ==
- List of treaties
