= Catholic League (German) =

Coalition in the Holy Roman Empire (1609–1635)

- Katholische Liga (German), Liga Catholica (Latin)
- The Marienfahne (Marian Flag), borne by Bavarian troops loyal to the Catholic League.
- Founders: List of founder states: Augsburg; Bamberg; Bavaria; Cologne; Constance; Eichstätt; Ellwangen; Kempten; Mainz; Passau; Speyer; Straßburg; Trier; Worms; Würzburg
- Leaders: Maximilian, Duke of Bavaria (1609–35); Johann von Kronberg (1609–26); Georg von Greiffenklau (1626–29); Anselm von Umstadt (1629–35)
- Military leader: Johann Tserclaes (1610–32); Johann von Aldringen (1632–34)
- Dates active: July 10, 1609 – May 30, 1635
- Allegiance: Holy Roman Empire (Vatican City) Catholic Church
- Headquarters: Munich
- Active regions: Holy Roman Empire
- Ideology: Anti-Protestantism
- Status: dissolved by the Peace of Prague (1635)
- Size: varied, up to 40,000
- Wars: War of the Jülich Succession, Thirty Years' War

The Catholic League (Latin: Liga Catholica, German: Katholische Liga) was a coalition of Catholic states of the Holy Roman Empire formed 10 July 1609. While initially formed as a confederation to act politically to negotiate issues vis-à-vis the Protestant Union (formed 1608), modelled on the more intransigent ultra-Catholic French Catholic League (1576), it was subsequently concluded as a military alliance "for the defence of the Catholic religion and peace within the Empire".

Notwithstanding the league's founding, as had the founding of the Protestant Union, it further exacerbated long standing tensions between the Protestant reformers and the adherents of the Catholic Church which thereafter began to get worse with ever more frequent episodes of civil disobedience, repression, and retaliation that would eventually ignite into the first phase of the Thirty Years' War roughly a decade later with the act of rebellion and calculated insult known as the Third Defenestration of Prague on 23 May 1618.

== Background ==
=== Peace of Augsburg ===
In 1555, the Peace of Augsburg was signed, which confirmed the result of the Diet of Speyer (1526) and ended the violence between the Catholics and the Lutherans in the Holy Roman Empire.

It stated that:

- Princes of the Holy Roman Empire (numbering 225) could choose the religion (Catholicism or Lutheranism) for their realms according to their conscience (the principle of cuius regio, eius religio).
- Lutherans living in an ecclesiastical state (under the control of a Catholic prince-bishop) could remain Lutherans.
- Lutherans could keep the territory that they had captured from the Catholic Church since the Peace of Passau (1552).
- The ecclesiastical leaders of the Catholic Church (bishops) that converted to Lutheranism had to give up their territory (the principle called reservatum ecclesiasticum).

Those occupying a state that had officially chosen either Catholicism or Lutheranism could not practice the religion differing to that of the state.

Although the Peace created a temporary end to hostilities, the underlying basis of the religious conflict remained unsolved. Both parties interpreted it at their convenience, the Lutherans in particular considering it only a momentary agreement. Further, Calvinism spread quickly throughout the Holy Roman Empire, adding a third major Christian worldview to the region, but its position was not supported in any way by the Augsburg terms, since Catholicism and Lutheranism were the only permitted creeds.

=== Motivations for a Catholic alliance ===
==== Donauwörth processions ====
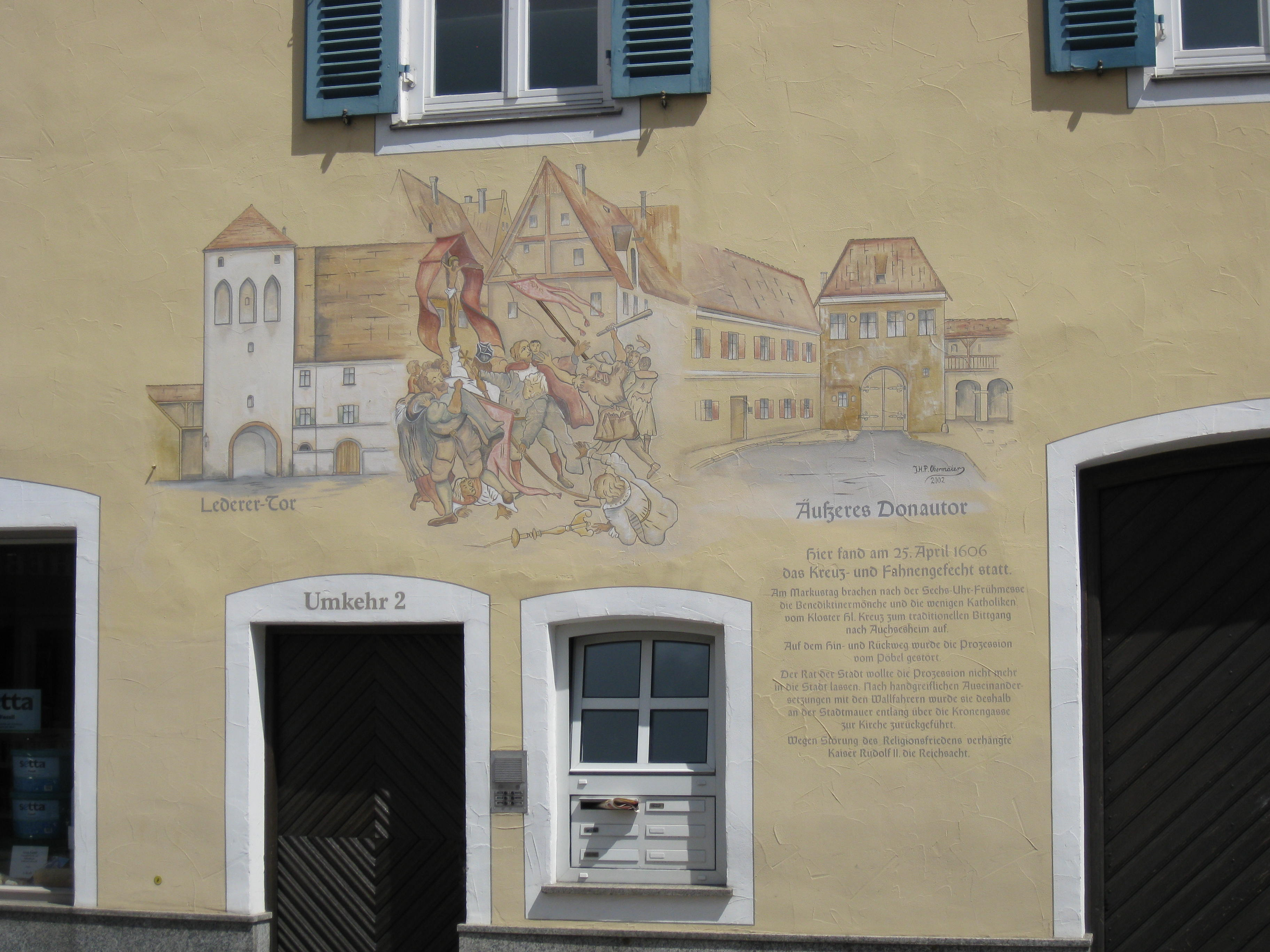
Mural in Donauwörth in memory of the Kreuz- und Fahnengefecht

The best documented reason of the foundation of the Catholic League was an incident called the Kreuz- und Fahnengefecht (lit. 'Cross and Flag engagement') in Donauwörth, a Free Imperial City within the territory of Bavaria. On 25 April 1606, the Lutheran majority of the town barred the Catholic residents of the town from holding an annual procession on St. Mark's Day, to show the rule of their confession over the town. The Catholics, led by five monks, wanted to pass through the town and on to the nearby village of Ausesheim, showing their flags and singing hymns. They were permitted to do so by the terms of the Peace of Augsburg. The city council would only allow them to re-enter town without flags and singing. The conflict ended in a brawl.

On protest of the bishop of Augsburg, Catholic Emperor Rudolf II of Habsburg threatened an Imperial ban in case of further violation of the rights of the Catholic citizens. Nevertheless, next year similar anti-Catholic incidents of civil disobedience took place, and the participants of the Markus procession were thrown out of town.

Emperor Rudolf then declared an Imperial ban on the town and ordered Maximilian I, Duke of Bavaria to execute the ban. Facing his army, the town surrendered. According to Imperial law, the disciplinary measures should not have been executed by the Catholic duke of Bavaria, but by the Protestant duke of Württemberg, who, like Donauwörth, was a member of the Swabian Imperial Circle. Maximilian de facto absorbed the former Free Imperial City, which was a violation of Imperial law as well.

==== Protestant Union formed ====
In the same year, 1607, the Catholic majority of the Reichstag meeting in the Diet of Augsburg resolved that the renewal of the Peace of Augsburg of 1555 should be conditional on the restoration of all church land appropriated since 1552. Acting on these events, the Protestant princes formed a military alliance on 14 May 1608, the Protestant Union, whose leader was Frederick IV of Wittelsbach, the Elector Palatine.

== The foundation of the Catholic League ==
To create a union of Catholic states as a counterpart to this Protestant Union, early in 1608 Maximilian started negotiations with other Catholic princes. On 5 July 1608, the spiritual electors manifested a tendency in favour of the confederacy suggested by Maximilian. Opinions were even expressed as to the size of the confederate military forces to be raised.

=== Munich Diet ===
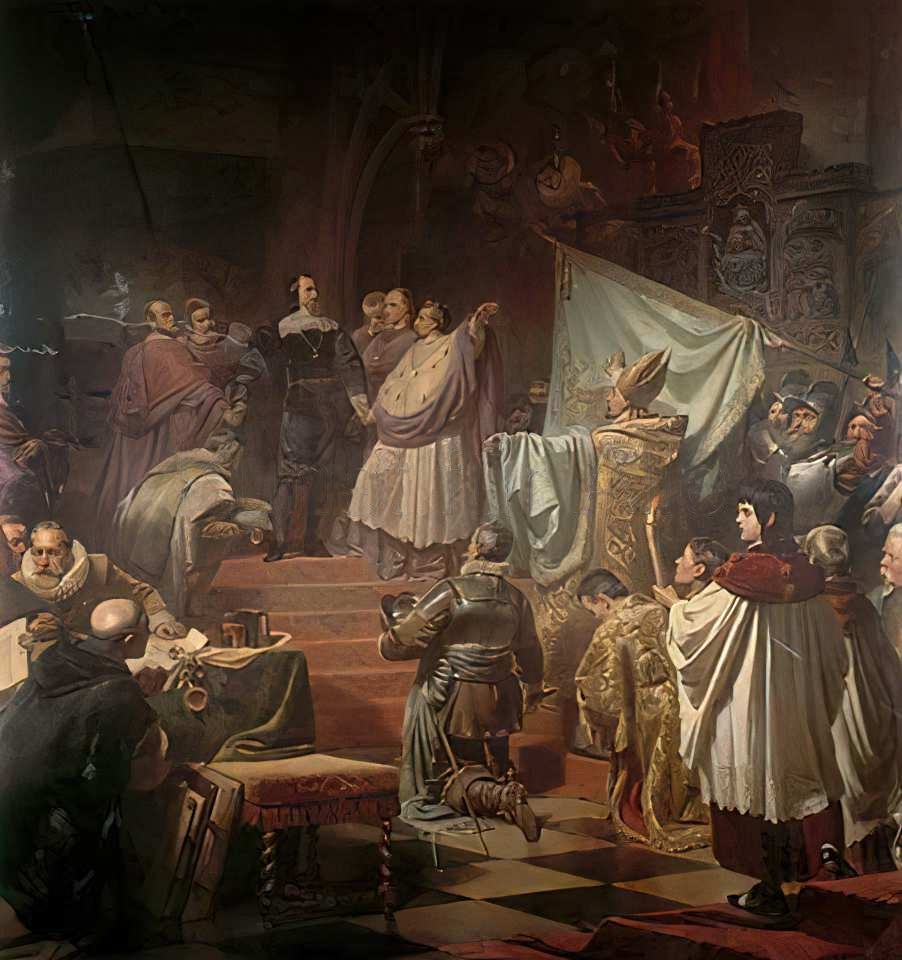
Foundation of the Catholic League, 1870 painting by Karl von Piloty

In July 1609, the representatives of the Prince-Bishops of Augsburg, Constance, Passau, Regensburg, and Würzburg assembled at Munich. The Prince-Archbishop of Salzburg, having shown disapproval, was not invited, and the Prince-Bishop of Eichstädt hesitated. On 10 July 1609, the participating states concluded an alliance "for the defence of the Catholic religion and peace within the Empire." The most important regulation of the League was the prohibition of attacks on one another. Instead of fighting, conflicts had to be decided by the laws of the Empire or, if these failed to solve the conflict, by arbitration within the League. Should one member be attacked, it had to be helped with military or alternatively legal support. Duke Maximilian was to be the president, and the Prince-Bishops of Augsburg, Passau, and Würzburg his councillors. The League was to continue for nine years.

The Munich Diet failed to erect a substantial structure for the newly formed League. On 18 June 1609, the Electors of Mainz, Cologne, and Trier had proposed an army of 20,000 men. They had also considered making Maximilian president of the alliance, and on August 30 they announced their adhesion to the Munich agreement, provided that Maximilian accepted the Elector of Mainz, arch-chancellor of the Empire, as co-president.

=== Meeting at Würzburg ===
To create a structure, several general meetings of the members were arranged. On 10 February 1610, the representatives of all the important Catholic states, except for Austria and Salzburg — and a great number of the smaller ones — met at Würzburg to decide the organization, funding and arming of the League. This was the real beginning of the Catholic League. The Pope, the Emperor and the King of Spain, who had been informed by Maximilian, were all favorably disposed towards the undertaking.

The main problem of the League was the unreadiness of its members. In April 1610, the contributions of all its members were not yet paid; Maximilian threatened to resign. To prevent him from doing so, Spain, which had made the giving of a subsidy dependent on Austria's enrollment in the League, waived this condition, and the pope promised a further contribution.

== Pre-war years ==
=== War of the Jülich Succession ===
The conduct of the Union in the Jülich dispute and the warlike operations of the Union army in Alsace seemed to make a battle between League and Union inevitable.

=== House Habsburg joins ===
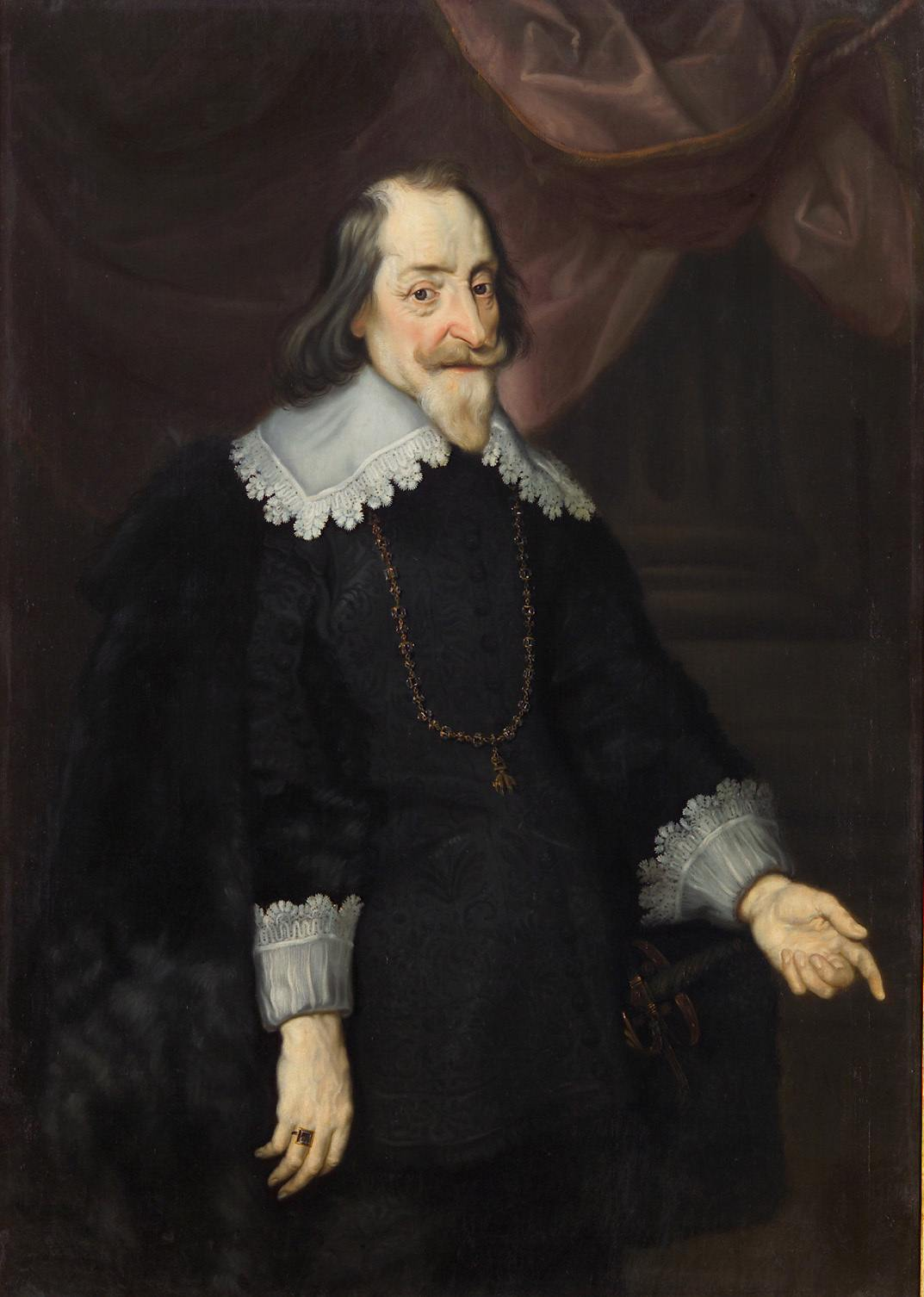
Maximilian I, Duke of Bavaria

In the year 1613 at Regensburg (Ratisbon), the Austrian Habsburgs joined the League. The assembly now appointed no less than three war-directors: Duke Maximilian, and Archdukes Albert and Maximilian of Austria. The object of the League was now declared "a Christian legal defense".

The membership of the Habsburg monarchy made the League part of the struggles between the emperor and his Protestant vassals in Bohemia and Lower Austria, that would lead to the beginning of the Thirty Years' War. The first half of the war would see the emperor using the Catholic League forces as the most important part of his Imperial army.

=== Bavaria leaves in protest ===
Duke Maximilian refused to accept the resolutions of Ratisbon and even resigned the post as president, when Archduke Maximilian III of Austria, the Prince Elector of Mainz and the Prince Elector of Trier, protested the inclusion of the Bishop of Augsburg, and the Provost of Ellwangen in the Bavarian Directory. On 27 May 1617, with the Prince-Bishops of Bamberg, Eichstädt, Würzburg, and the Prince-Provost of Ellwangen, Bavaria formed a separate league for nine years.

=== Bohemian revolt ===
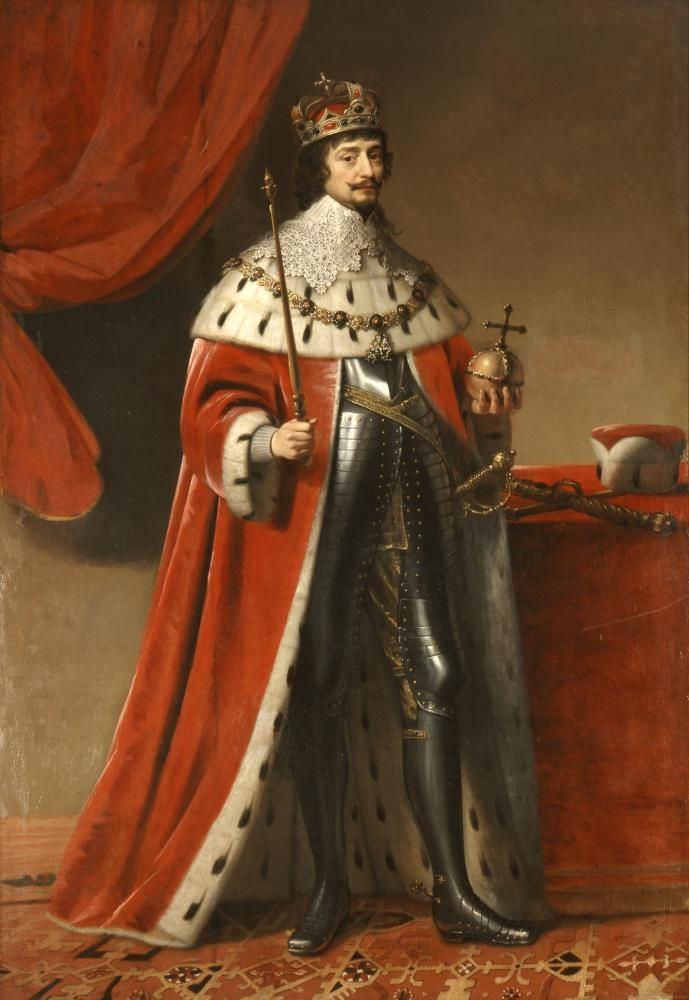
Frederick V of the Palatinate as King of Bohemia

Already having been crowned King of Bohemia in 1617, Ferdinand II and his Catholic governors were deposed by rebelling Protestant Czech nobles in the second defenestration of Prague in 1618. The Bohemian estates went on to elect Frederick V, Elector Palatine as their king, on 26 and 27 August 1619. After his election as German Emperor on August 28, Ferdinand conferred with the spiritual electors at Frankfurt, asking for the support of the League.

=== Catholic League reestablished ===
At the end of 1618, the position of the Emperor in Bohemia as in Lower and Upper Austria gradually became critical. Searching for help, the Emperor tried to restore the League. A meeting of several of the ecclesiastical Princes decided to reconstruct the League on its original basis. It would consist of two groups: the Rhenish district under the presidency of Mainz, and the Oberland district, presided by Bavaria; the treasury and the military command were to be considered separate. Maximilian could only lead the whole of the troops when he had to appear in the Rhenish district. On 31 May, the Oberland both groups were established and bound themselves to render mutual help for six years.

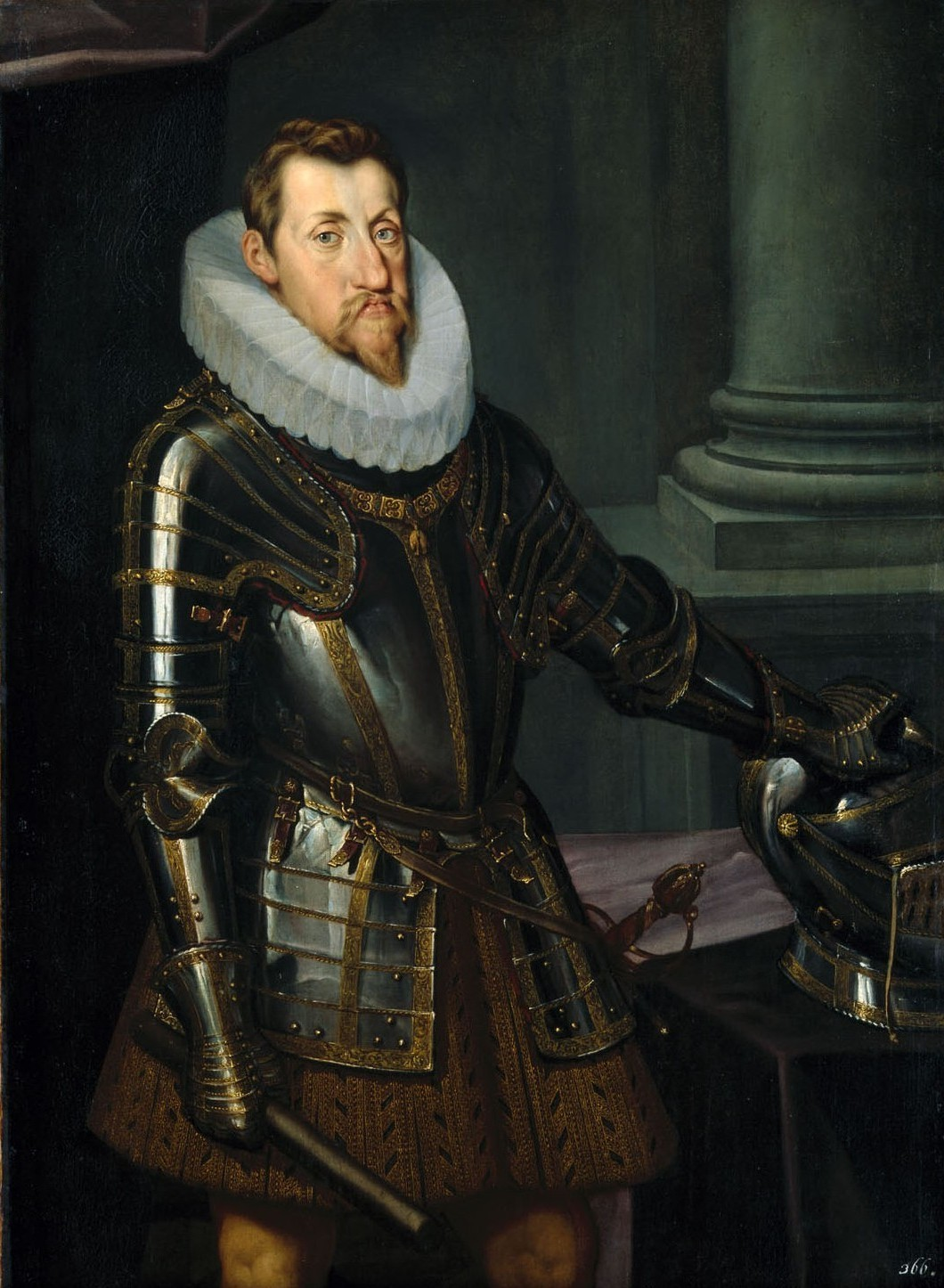
Ferdinand II, Holy Roman Emperor in armor

==== Treaty of Munich ====
The Treaty of Munich was signed on 8 October 1619 between Emperor Ferdinand II and Duke Maximilian of Bavaria. Spanish ambassador Oñate persuaded Ferdinand to grant Maximilian any part of the Electoral Palatinate to occupy, as well as the electoral seat of Frederick V. Moreover, Oñate exceeded his duties by guaranteeing Ferdinand Spanish support in dealing with the Bohemian rebels. Based on the terms of the treaty, Maximilian, leader of the Catholic League, made his Bavarian forces available to Emperor Ferdinand.

Now the formation of a confederate army began. With 7,000 men, Bavaria supplied the largest contribution to the army, whose strength was fixed at Würzburg in December 1619, as 21,000 infantry and 4000 cavalry. Commander in chief was Johann Tserclaes, Count of Tilly, a descendant of a Catholic Brabantine family.

=== Decline and end of the Protestant Union ===
Facing the superiority of the League army of 30,000 men confronting the Protestant Union's army of 10,000, on 3 July 1620, the Union agreed to cease all hostilities between both parties during the war in Austria and Bohemia in the Treaty of Ulm and dissolved the following year.

== The League in War ==
=== Bohemian campaign ===
Battle of White Mountain, painting by P. Snayers

Without the risk of an attack the League could use all its military forces to support the emperor. The same month, the army was relocated to Upper Austria. Tilly won the Battle of White Mountain north of Prague on 8 November 1620, in which half of the enemy forces were killed or captured, losing only 700 men. The Emperor regained control over Bohemia and the first stage of the League's activity during the Thirty Years' War ended.

=== Palatinate campaigns ===
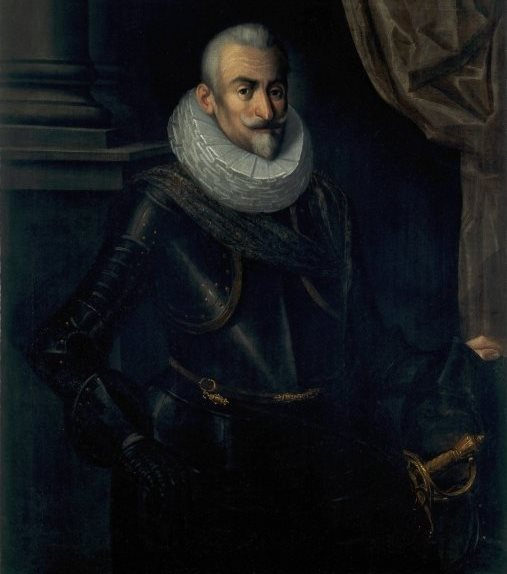
Count Tilly, commander in chief of the army of the Catholic League

==== 1622 campaign ====
In the spring of 1622 General Tilly moved the League's army to invade the Electoral Palatinate. They were defeated by General Mansfeld's troops at the Battle of Mingolsheim on 27 April 1622. Retreating eastwards they were joined by a Spanish army under General Córdoba. When another Protestant army under Georg Friedrich, Margrave of Baden attacked on May 6, Tilly's League force convincingly won the Battle of Wimpfen, scattering the enemy. The Battle of Höchst on June 20 proved to be the decisive victory for 1622.

After that battle the Protestant forces still fighting for Frederick V of the Palatinate withdrew over the Rhine and allowed the Catholic League army freedom of action. Consequently, Tilly captured the city of Heidelberg, Frederick's main city, following an eleven-week siege on September 19. Mannheim followed on November 2, after a ten day siege.

This could have meant the end of the war. With the exception of the still besieged fortress of Frankenthal, the Electoral Palatinate was occupied by League forces while Count Frederick was in Dutch exile.

==== Stadtlohn campaign ====
Alas, in 1623, Frederick had Christian of Brunswick, raise another army to continue the fight. However, Christian found little success and no allies on his short campaign. When Tilly approached with the League army, the Protestants made for the Dutch border. Tilly cut them off five miles short of it in the Battle of Stadtlohn on August 6, destroying another Protestant army.

This victory marked the end of the Bohemian-Palatinate phase of the war. Armed opposition against the Emperor and his anti-Protestant policies had ceased.

=== Danish War ===
This caused Denmark's king Christian IV to enter the Thirty Years' War in 1625 to protect Protestantism and also in a bid to make himself the primary leader of Northern Europe.

The league's army fought and defeated the Danish on 26–27 August 1626 at the Battle of Lutter, destroying more than half the fleeing Danish army. Because this and other victories by Wallenstein, Denmark was forced to sue for peace at the Treaty of Lübeck.

=== Edict of Restitution ===
Supported by the Catholic princes and their victorious League army, the emperor now moved to denounce Protestantism as illegal in many territories of Northern Germany.

In March 1629, emperor Ferdinand II passed the Edict of Restitution. It was specifically aimed at restoring the situation of the 1555 Peace of Augsburg in ecclesiastical territories that had strayed from "legal" Catholic faith and rule, in the decades since then.

Bremen and Magdeburg were the biggest examples of territories to be restituted. Afraid that the Catholic League's army would be sent to enforce this new law, if challenged, their protestant authorities again looked abroad for allies to protect them.

=== Swedish War ===
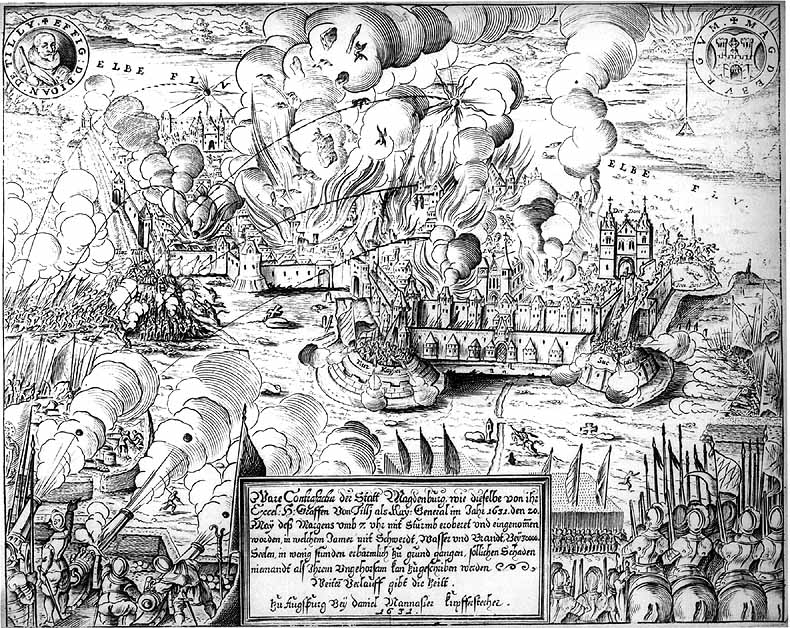
Sack of Magdeburg, 1632 engraving by D. Manasser

==== Sack of Magdeburg ====
While the Swedish King Gustavus Adolphus landed his army in Pomerania and tried to make alliances with the leaders of Northern Germany, the League's army laid siege to the city of Magdeburg for two months from 20 March 1631, as the city had promised to support Sweden. On May 20, 40,000 successfully attacked Magdeburg. A massacre of the populace ensued in which 25,000 of the 30,000 inhabitants of the city perished while fires destroyed much of the city.

==== The Catholic League in defeat ====
In 1630, Ferdinand II dismissed his Generalissimus Wallenstein. Now, the Catholic League was in control of all the Catholic armed forces.

At the First Battle of Breitenfeld, the Catholic League led by General Tilly was defeated by the Swedish forces. A year later (1632), they met again in the Battle of Rain, and this time General Tilly was killed. The upper hand had now switched from the league to Sweden and her allies, who were able to attack and capture or destroy the territories of the Catholic League. Even Munich, the capital of the most powerful member state, Electoral Bavaria, was conquered.

== Decline of importance and dissolution ==
Thereafter, the German Catholic League did not play a major role in later events.

The Peace of Prague of 30 May 1635, was a treaty between the Holy Roman Emperor, Ferdinand II, and most of the Protestant states of the Empire. It effectively ended the civil war aspect of the Thirty Years' War. The Edict of Restitution of 1629, was effectively revoked, with the terms of the Peace of Augsburg of 1555 being reestablished.

One of the most important regulations was that formal alliances between states of the Empire were prohibited. The armies of the various states were to be unified with those of the Emperor as an army for the Empire as a whole. The result of this clause was the end of the Catholic League, a now prohibited alliance between states of the Empire.

As well as ending the fighting between the various states, the treaty also ended religion as a source of national conflict; the principle of cuius regio, eius religio was established for good within the Empire.
