= Gerard Herbert =

English army officer in the service of the Electoral Palatinate (died 1622)

Sir Gerard Herbert (died 6 or 17 September 1622), also spelt Gerrard and Garrett, was an English commander during the Eighty Years' War and the Thirty Years' War.

He was knighted by King James at his palace in Royston in 1613. Herbert was killed in September 1622 at the Siege of Heidelberg, where he was fighting on behalf of King James' son-in-law Frederick V of the Palatinate. His defense of Heidelberg Castle was destroyed by the Imperial-Spanish troops of Johan Tzerclaes, Count of Tilly and Don Gonzalo Fernández de Córdoba. Sir Simonds d'Ewes wrote of the account he received from Sir Dudley North, that Herbert "was slaine after three pikes first valiantlye brooken, being then shott in the head. This hapned through the cowardice of the Dutchmen in the outworkes, as he fullye dilated it to mee."

Herbert was a kinsman of the Earl of Pembroke. He was a courtier at the Elizabethan and Jacobean courts, where he was invited to entertainment events called "masques". In 1617–19, he wrote a series of letters to Dudley Carleton, 1st Viscount Dorchester with detailed reports on the dramatic performances, including a first-hand account of Shakespeare's Pericles performed in May 1617, and a masque at Elsyng Palace produced by Philip Herbert, Earl of Montgomery. Herbert described the destruction of the first Jacobean Banqueting House at Whitehall Palace by fire in June 1619, which he attributed to workmen setting fire to oily rags.
