= Battle of Mingolsheim =

1622 battle of the Thirty Years' War

Coordinates: 49°13′0.64″N 8°39′29.84″E

- Part of the Palatinate phase of the Thirty Years' War
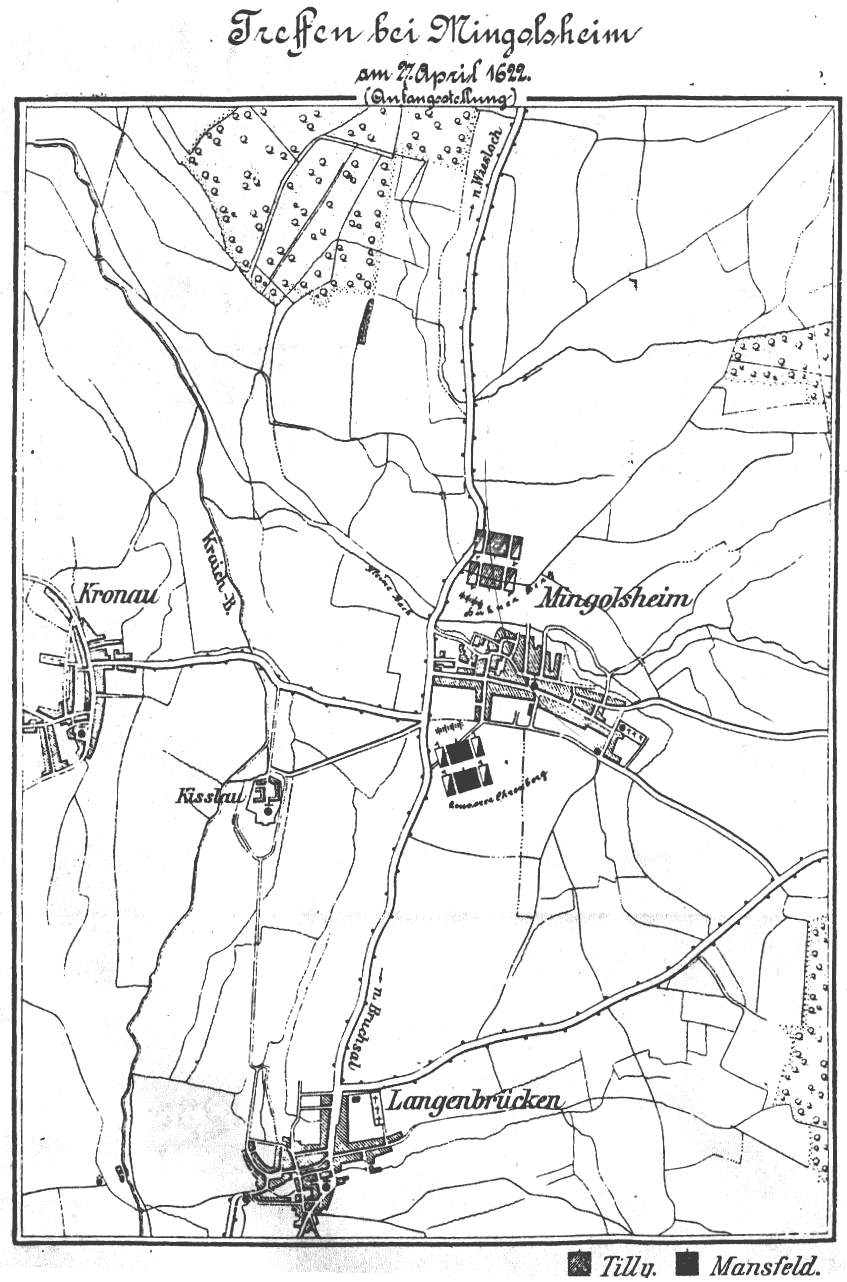
- Battlefield in Mingolsheim / Bad Schönborn.
| Date | 27 April 1622 |
| Location | Mingolsheim, 22 km (14 mi) south of Heidelberg |
| Result | Palatine victory |

Belligerents
| Palatinate | Holy Roman Empire; Catholic League |

Commanders and leaders
| Ernst von Mansfeld; Hans von Obentraut; Georg Frederick | Count of Tilly |

Strength
| 18,000 | 15,000 |

Casualties and losses
| 400 killed | 2,000 |

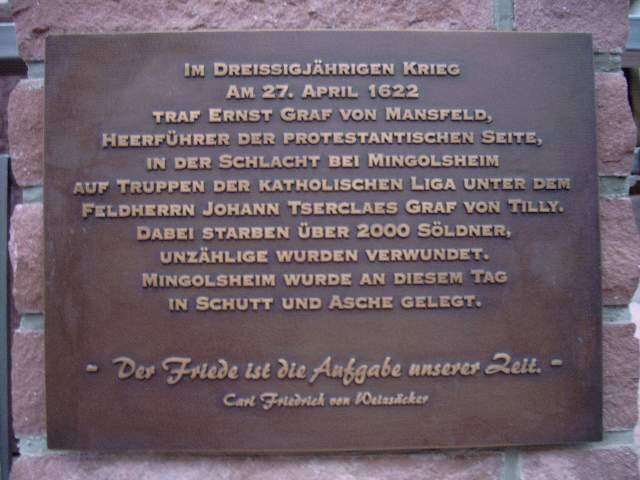
Memorial plate of the Battle of Mingolsheim

The Battle of Mingolsheim (German: Schlacht bei Mingolsheim) was fought on 27 April 1622, near the German village of Wiesloch, 23 km (14 mi) south of Heidelberg (and 8 km or 5 mi south of Wiesloch), between a Protestant army under General von Mansfeld, Hans Michael Elias von Obentraut, and the Margrave of Baden-Durlach against a Roman Catholic army under Count Tilly.

Early in the spring of 1621, a mercenary force under the command of Georg Friedrich, Margrave of Baden-Durlach, crossed the Rhine River from Alsace to junction with a force under Ernst von Mansfeld. Combined, the armies aimed to prevent a link-up between Count Tilly and Gonzalo Fernández de Córdoba, arriving with an army 20,000 strong from the Spanish Netherlands under orders from General Ambrosio Spinola. Tilly met the Protestant army at its rear guard and drove upon it. This attack was successful until he engaged the main Protestant body, and was then rebuffed. Tilly retreated and bypassed the stationary Protestant army to link up with de Córdoba later that month. After the battle, Mansfeld found himself at a distinct disadvantage until the armies of Christian of Brunswick could arrive from the north. The two armies would engage later in the month at the Battle of Wimpfen.

== Bibliography ==
- Wilson, Peter H. (2009). Europe's Tragedy: A History of the Thirty Years War. Allen Lane. ISBN 978-0-7139-9592-3.
