= Johann Tserclaes, Count of Tilly =

Catholic marshal of the Thirty Years' War (1559–1632)

Johann Tserclaes Count of Tilly
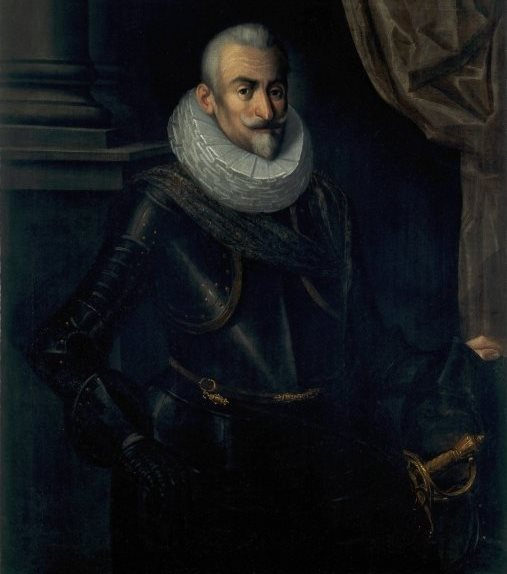
- Count Tilly on a portrait
- Born: February 1559; Castle Tilly, Duchy of Brabant, Spanish Netherlands, Holy Roman Empire
- Died: 30 April 1632 (aged 73); Ingolstadt, Electoral Bavaria, Holy Roman Empire
- Burial place: Altötting
- Military career
- Allegiance: Spain; Holy Roman Empire; Bavaria
- Branch: Army of Flanders; Army of the Catholic League; Imperial Army of the Holy Roman Emperor
- Service years: 1574–1632
- Rank: Generalfeldmarschall
- Nickname: The Monk in Armor
- Conflicts: Eighty Years' War; Fall of Antwerp; Long Turkish War; Thirty Years' War; Battle of White Mountain; Battle of Mingolsheim; Battle of Wimpfen; Battle of Höchst; Siege of Heidelberg; Capture of Mannheim; Battle of Stadtlohn; Battle of Lutter; Sack of Magdeburg; Battle of Werben; Battle of Breitenfeld (WIA); Battle of Bamberg; Battle of Rain (DOW)

Johann Tserclaes, Count of Tilly (Dutch: Johan t'Serclaes Graaf van Tilly; German: Johann t'Serclaes Graf von Tilly; French: Jean t'Serclaes, comte de Tilly; February 1559 – 30 April 1632) was a field marshal who commanded the Catholic League's forces in the Thirty Years' War. From 1620 to 1631, he led a number of important imperial victories, including White Mountain, Wimpfen, Höchst, Stadtlohn and the Conquest of the Palatinate. He destroyed a Danish army at Lutter and sacked the Protestant city of Magdeburg, which caused the deaths of some 20,000 of the city's inhabitants, both defenders and non-combatants, out of a total population of 25,000.

However, Tilly's army was defeated at Breitenfeld in 1631 by the Swedish army of King Gustavus Adolphus. He then defeated the Swedish army at the Battle of Bamberg before a bullet from a Swedish arquebus mortally wounded him at the Battle of Rain on 15 April 1632, and he died two weeks later in Ingolstadt on 30 April 1632, at the age of 73. Along with Duke Albrecht von Wallenstein of Friedland and Mecklenburg, he was one of two chief commanders of the Holy Roman Empire's forces during the first half of the Thirty Years' War. Military historian Gaston Bodart (1908) refers to Tilly as one of the most notable military leaders from modern and contemporary times.

== Early years ==
Johann Tserclaes was born on February 1559 in Castle Tilly, Walloon Brabant, in the Spanish Netherlands, in what is now Belgium, to a devoutly Catholic Brabantine family. After receiving a Jesuit education in Cologne, he joined the Spanish Army at the age of fifteen and fought under Alexander Farnese, Duke of Parma in his campaign against the rebellious Dutch forces during the Eighty Years' War, participating in the successful Siege of Antwerp in 1585. After this he joined the Holy Roman Empire's campaign against the Ottoman Turks in Hungary and the Transylvania as a mercenary during the Long Turkish War in 1600, and through rapid promotion became a field marshal in only five years. When the Turkish War ended in 1606, he remained in the service of Rudolf II in Prague until he was appointed commander of the Catholic League forces by Bavaria under Maximilian I, Duke of Bavaria in 1610.

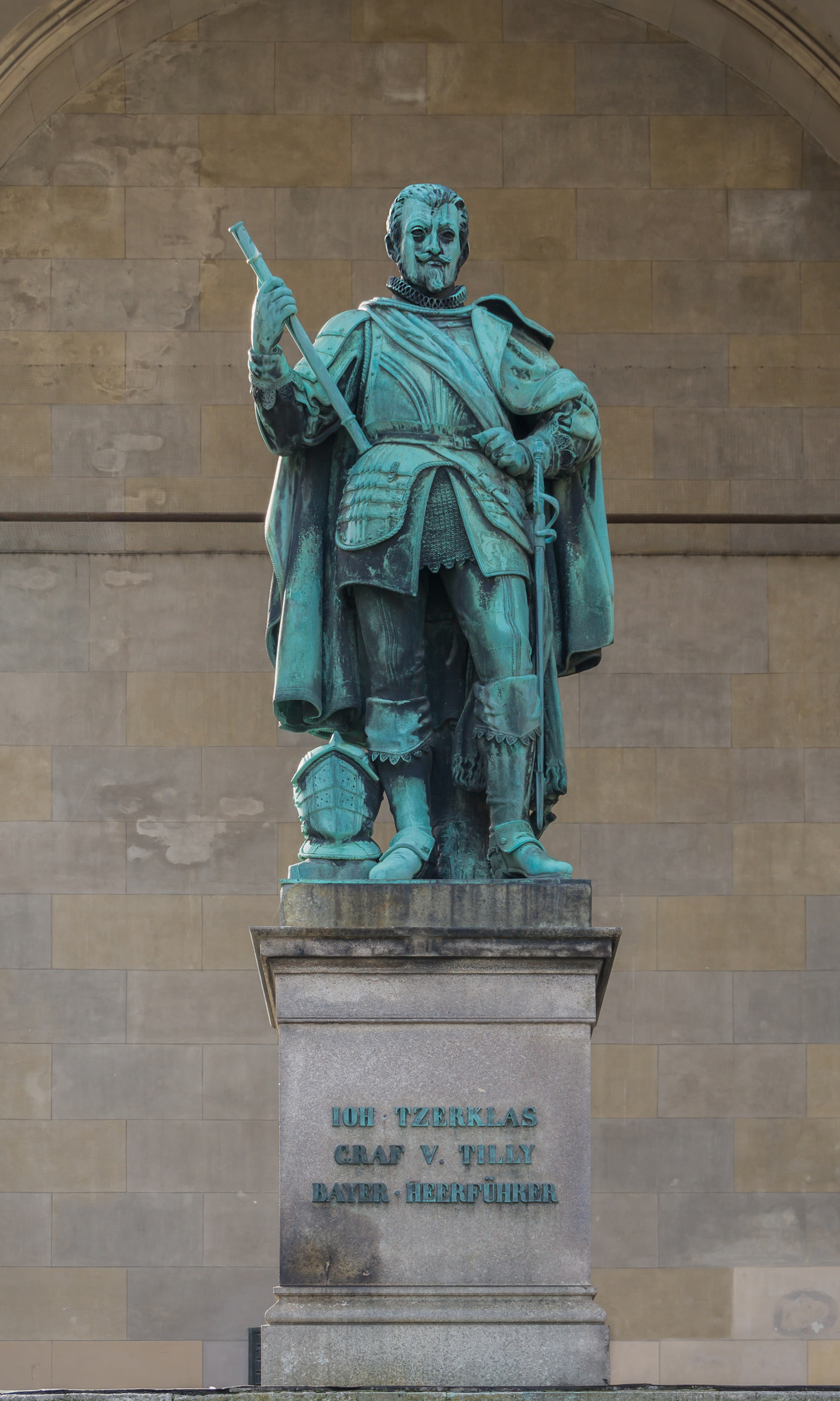
Bronze statue of Count Tilly in the Feldherrnhalle on Odeonsplatz in Munich

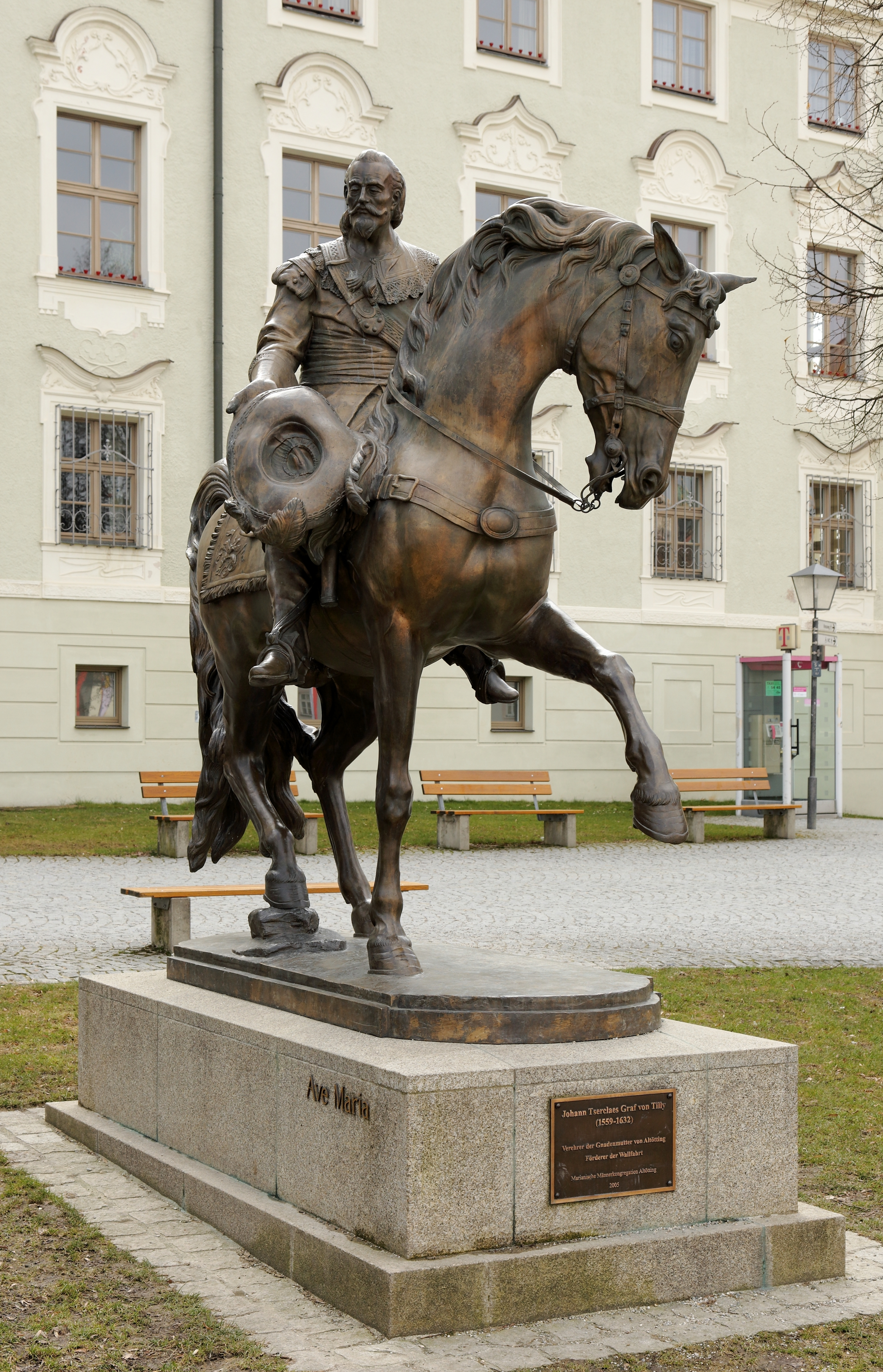
Statue of Tilly in Altötting

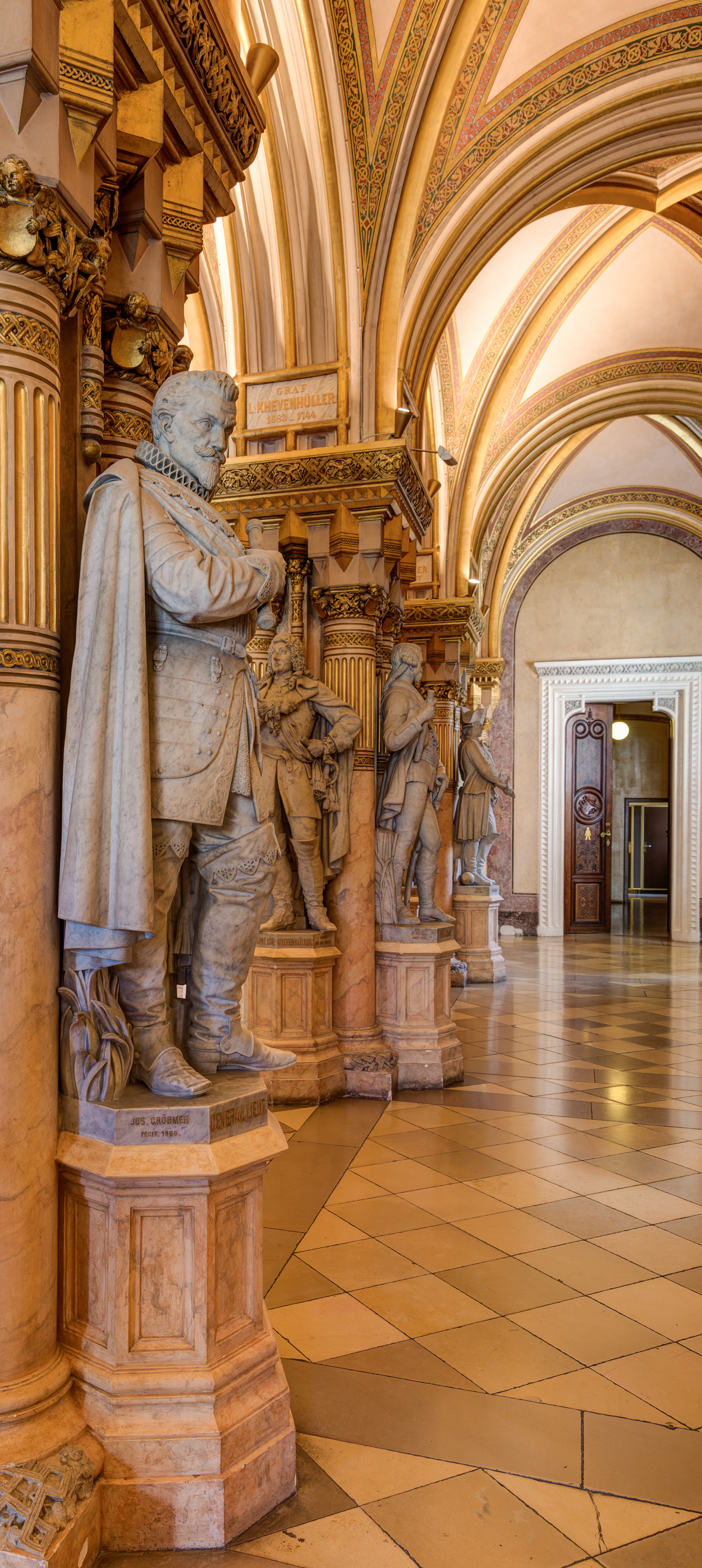
Statue of Tilly in the hall of fame of the Museum of Military History, Vienna

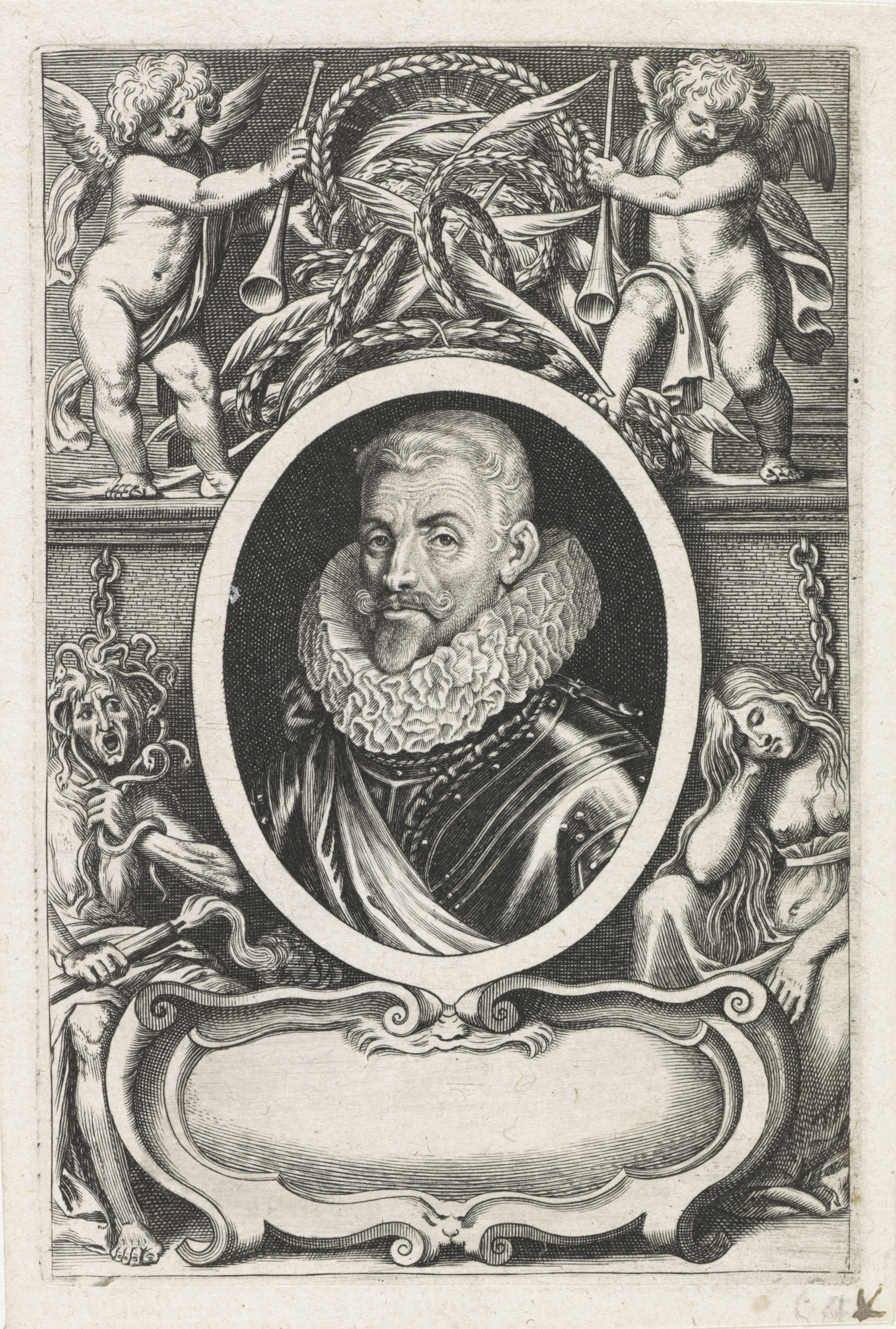
Portrait of Johann Tserclaes after Nicolaas van der Horst

== Campaign in Bohemia ==
As commander of the forces of the Catholic League, Tilly fought against the Bohemian rebels following the Defenestration of Prague, by which time he had trained his soldiers in the Spanish Tercio system, which featured musketeers supported by deep ranks of pikemen. A force of 25,000 soldiers, including troops of both the Catholic League and the Emperor scored an important victory against Christian of Anhalt and Count Thurn at the decisive Battle of White Mountain west of Prague on 8 November 1620. Half of the enemy forces were killed or captured, while the Catholic League lost only 700 men. This victory was vital in crushing resistance to the Emperor in Bohemia, as it allowed Prague to be captured several days later.

== Campaign in Germany ==
Next, Tilly turned west and marched through Germany, but was defeated at the Battle of Mingolsheim on 27 April 1622. He then joined with the Spanish general Duke Gonzalo Fernández de Córdoba – not to be confused with the famous Spanish general of the same name from the Italian Wars in Italy at the end of the 15th century – and was victorious at the Battle of Wimpfen against George Fredrick, Margrave of Baden-Durlach on 6 May; this victory occurred after the enemies' ammunition tumbril was hit by cannon fire and exploded.

He was successful again at the Battle of Höchst on 20 June and was made a count (Graf in German) for this victory. These three battles in two months allowed him to capture the city of Heidelberg following an eleven-week siege on 19 September. Christian the Younger of Brunswick, whom he had already defeated at Höchst, raised another army, but again lost to him at the Battle of Stadtlohn, where 13,000 out of his army of 15,000 were lost, including fifty of his high-ranking officers. Together with the complete surrender of Bohemia in 1623, this ended virtually all resistance in Germany. This caused King Christian IV of Denmark to enter the Thirty Years' War in 1625 to protect Protestantism, and also in a bid to make himself the primary leader of Northern Europe. Count Tilly besieged and captured Münden on 30 May 1626, whereupon local and refugee Protestant ministers were thrown into the river Werra, but could not lay a siege to Kassel.

Tilly fought the Danes at the Battle of Lutter on 26–27 August 1626, in which his highly disciplined infantry charged the enemy lines four times, breaking through. This led him to win decisively, destroying more than half the fleeing Danish army, which was uncharacteristic of the warfare of the time. Denmark was forced to sue for peace at the Treaty of Lübeck. This disrupted the balance of power in Europe resulting in Swedish involvement in 1630 under their redoubtable leader, the brilliant King and field general Gustavus Adolphus of Sweden, who had been trying to dominate the Baltic for the previous ten years in wars with Poland, then a continental power of note.

== Sack of Magdeburg ==
While Gustavus Adolphus landed his army in Mecklenburg and was in Berlin, trying to make alliances with the leaders of Northern Germany, Tilly laid siege to the city of Magdeburg on the Elbe, which promised to support Sweden.

The siege began on 20 March 1631, and Tilly put his subordinate Gottfried Heinrich Graf zu Pappenheim in command while he campaigned elsewhere. After two months of laying siege, and after the fall of Frankfurt an der Oder to the Swedes, Pappenheim finally convinced Tilly, who had brought reinforcements, to storm the city on 20 May with 40,000 men under the personal command of Pappenheim. The assault was successful and the walls were breached, but the commanders supposedly lost control of their soldiers. A massacre of the populace ensued in which roughly 20,000 of the 25,000 inhabitants of the city perished by sword and the fire which destroyed most of the city, then one of the largest cities in Germany and about the size of Cologne or Hamburg.

Many historians consider it unlikely that Tilly ordered the city to be torched. Magdeburg was a strategically vital city of the Elbe and was needed as a resupply center for the looming fight against the Swedes. Although extremely opposed to the Reformation movement, Tilly was an experienced commander and would have recognized the strategic importance of the city. Additionally, he sent a proposal of surrender to Magdeburg days before the final assault, after the capture of the Toll redoubt. However, the city's mayor rejected the offer, expecting a Swedish relief force to arrive soon. When the slaughter began, and no escape was possible, the children of the city were formed in procession and marched across the marketplace singing Luther's hymn Erhalt uns, Herr, bei deinem Wort whose opening verse translates as "Lord keep us steadfast in thy Word, Curb Pope and Turk who by the sword, would wrest the kingdom from thy Son, and set at naught all he hath done." The children were slain without mercy, but whether by order from Tilly or not remains debated in some quarters. Tilly afterwards reportedly wrote to the Emperor

Never was such a victory since the storming of Troy or of Jerusalem. I am sorry that you and the ladies of the court were not there to enjoy the spectacle.

== Campaign against the Swedes and death ==
Following Magdeburg, Tilly engaged the army of Gustavus Adolphus at the Battle of Breitenfeld on 17 September 1631, near the city of Leipzig, which he had reached after laying waste to Saxony. In the battle he was outmaneuvered by King Gustavus Adolphus and suffered a crushing defeat. The Swedes' maneuvering and accurate, rapid artillery fire caused his troops to break and flee. He withdrew, and political rivalries prevented Wallenstein from coming to his aid, so he turned to defence. He defeated the Swedes at Bamberg on 9 March 1632. While attempting to prevent the Swedes from crossing into Bavaria over the Lech near Rain am Lech, he was wounded early in the Battle of Rain on 15 April by a 90-gram arquebus bullet (not, as erroneously reported, by a culverin cannon ball), which shattered his right thigh, and died of osteomyelitis (bone infection) fifteen days later in Ingolstadt at the age of 73 on 30 April 1632. His tomb is in Altötting, Upper Bavaria.

== Descendants ==
Fraternal descendants include Antonio Octavio Tserclaes de Tilly (1646–1715) and Claude Frédéric t'Serclaes, Count of Tilly (1648-1723). Antonio was a general and nobleman in service of Spain, while his younger brother Claude fought in service of the army of the Dutch Republic. A sister or daughter, Albertina, of this Prince Antonio Octavio, would be the first root for the Spanish ducal title, Dukes of Tserclaes, bestowed in July 1856 by Queen Isabella II of Spain to members of the Pérez de Guzmán family, living in Jerez and Seville, Spain.

== Fictional appearances ==
- Tilly is mentioned in Bertolt Brecht's Mother Courage and Her Children: in the scene in which his funeral is held, Mother Courage famously says "I don't care if this funeral is a historical event, to me the mutilation of my daughter's face is a historical event."
- Tilly is depicted in First Breitenfeld and in the Battle of Rain in the novel 1632.

== Notes ==
Titles of nobility
New title	Count of Tilly; 1622–1632	Succeeded by Ernst Tserclaes
