= Sir John Burroughs =

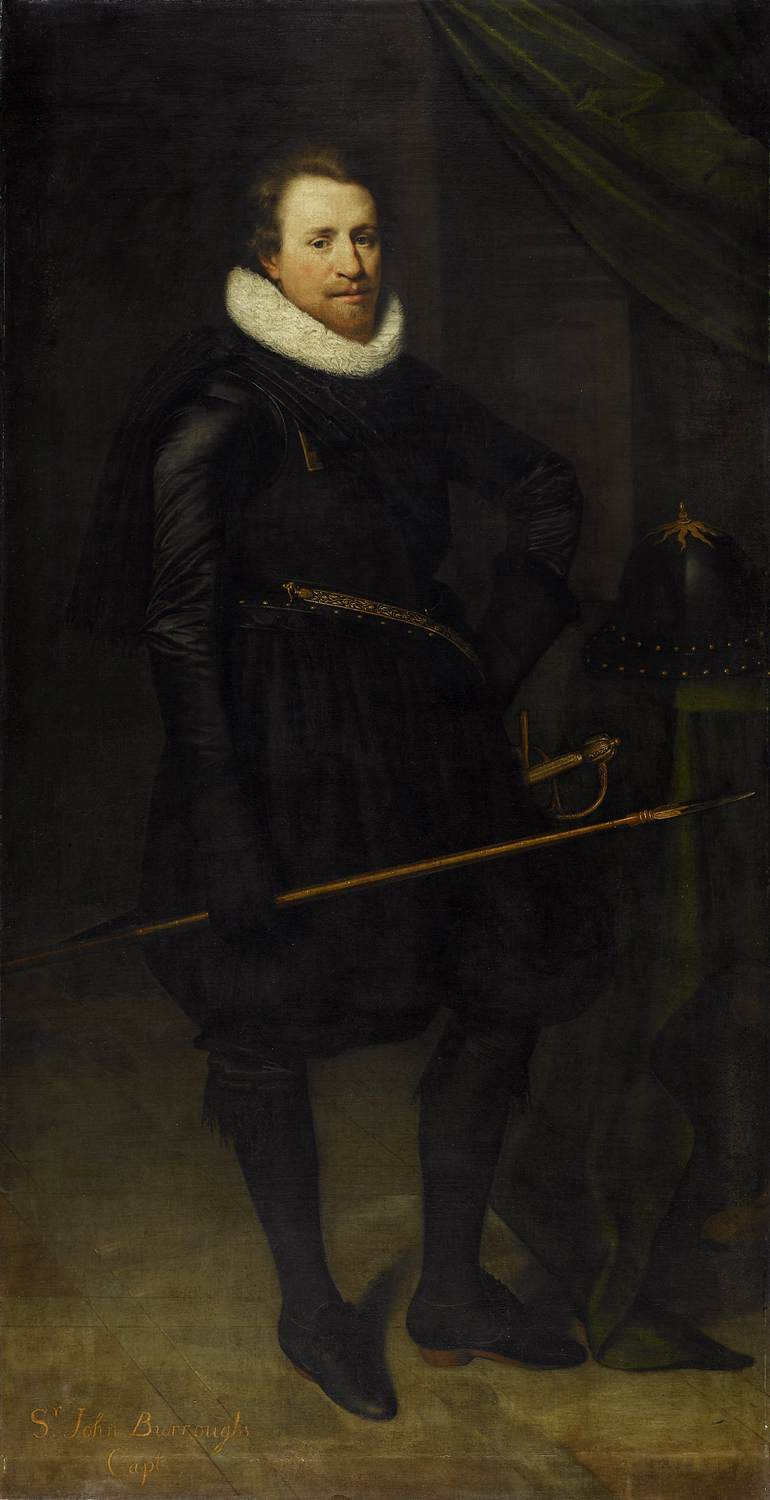
- Died: 1627
- Relatives: Thomas Burgh, 3rd Baron Borough of Gainsborough
- Military career
- Conflicts: Eighty Years' War; Thirty Years' War

Sir John Burroughs was an English military officer who served under Horace Vere in the Electorate of the Palatinate, during the Eighty Years' War and the Thirty Years' War.

Sir John was a brother of Thomas Burgh, 3rd Baron Borough of Gainsborough. He commanded a company in the Netherlands in 1585-6 and was appointed Governor of Doesburg after its capture.

Sir John was respected as "one of the most distinguished and scholarly soldiers of his time ... He had seen more service than any man in the army, and in all questions of military science his word was law."
