= Christian the Younger of Brunswick =

German Protestant military leader during the Thirty Years' War

Herzog Christian von Braunschweig-Lüneburg
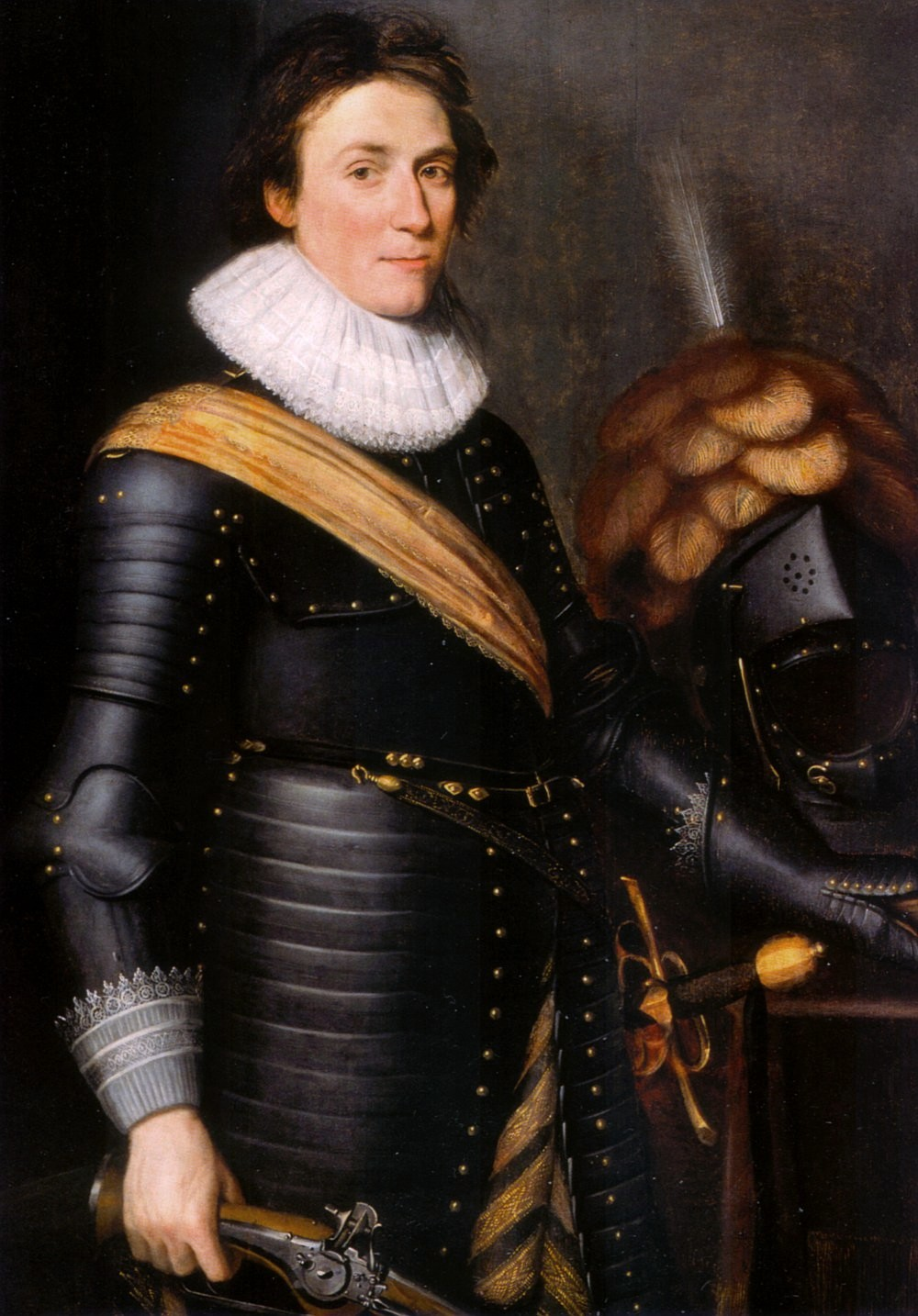
- Portrait of Christian of Brunswick-Lüneburg by Jan Anthonisz van Ravesteyn, 1620.
- Born: 20 September 1599; Gröningen Priory
- Died: June 16, 1626 (aged 26); Wolfenbüttel
- Education: University of Helmstedt
- Occupations: nobleman and soldier
- Parent(s): Henry Julius of Brunswick-Lüneburg, Elizabeth

Christian the Younger of Brunswick-Wolfenbüttel (20 September 1599 – 16 June 1626), known as der tolle Halberstädter (the daredevil from Halberstadt), was a German Protestant military leader during the early years of the Thirty Years' War. Christian fought in support of Frederick V of the Palatinate during the "Palatinate Phase" (1620-1623) of the war; his opponents were the forces of the Imperial House of Habsburg (led by Holy Roman Emperor Ferdinand II), Habsburg Spain, and the Catholic League. Christian was a member of the House of Welf, titular Duke of Brunswick-Lüneburg and administrator of the Prince-Bishopric of Halberstadt

According to the historian Herfried Münkler, Christian´s military exploits were motivated less by any deep attachment to the Protestant cause than by a love of adventure, a romantic imagination in which he saw himself in the chivalric tradition and a disdain for every form of traditional authority. Likewise his frequent mockery of his Catholic opponents stemmed from a cynical distance from Catholic belief, rather than Protestant conviction.

== Life ==
=== Birth and early years ===
Christian was born in 1599 at the Gröningen Priory near Halberstadt (in today's Saxony-Anhalt), the third son of Duke Henry Julius of Brunswick-Lüneburg (1564–1613) by his second wife Elizabeth (1573–1626), daughter of the late King Frederick II of Denmark. After his father's death, Christian was educated by his maternal uncle, King Christian IV of Denmark, and attended the University of Helmstedt. After the death of his brother Rudolf in 1616, Christian, at the age of 17, was elected his successor as Lutheran administrator of the Halberstadt bishopric. Though he did not obtain any confirmation by the Emperor or the Catholic Church, this position provided him the necessary finances to start a military career.

=== Campaigns of 1622-23 ===
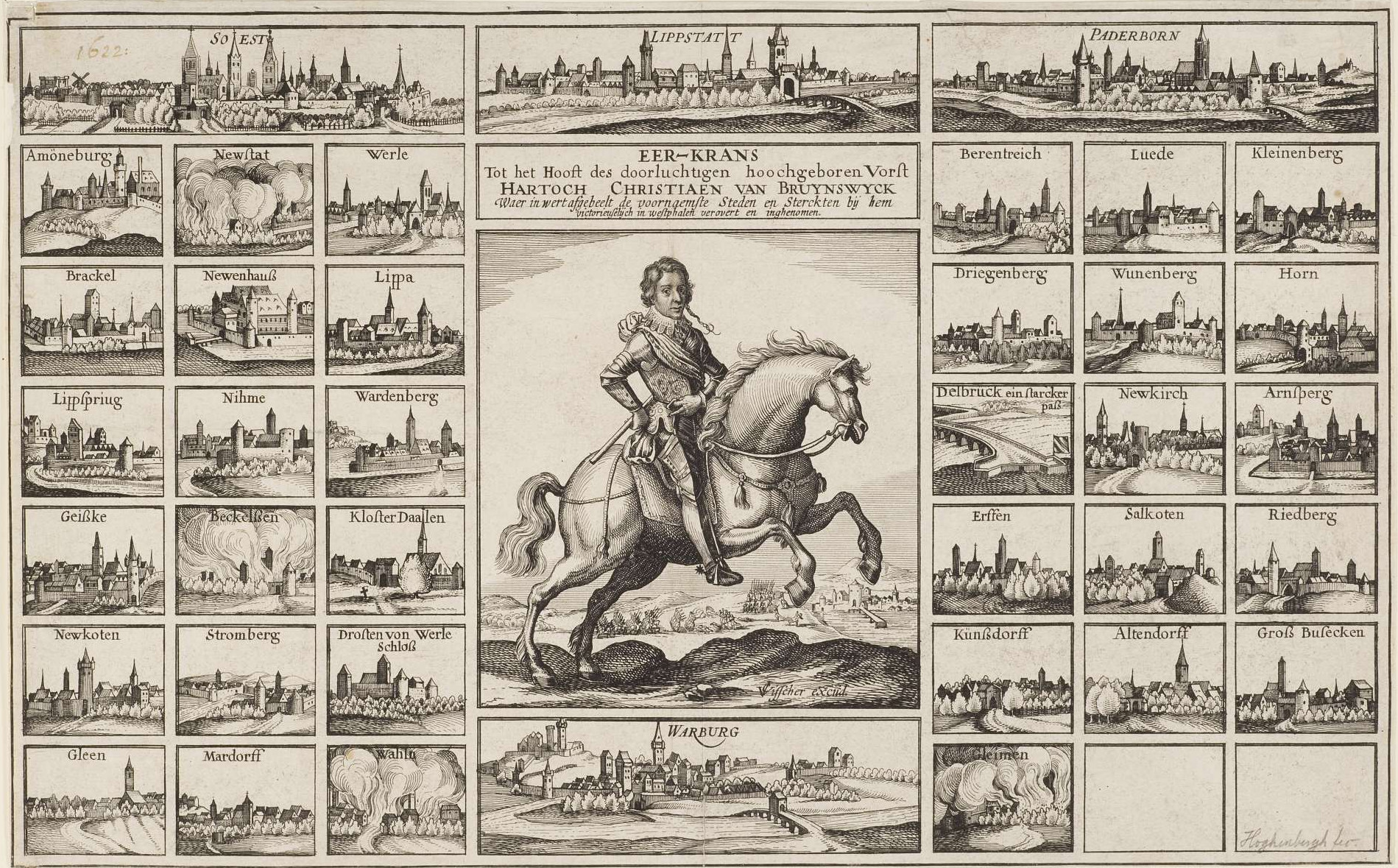
Christian von Braunschweig und westfälische Städteansichten

In 1620 Christian joined the army of Prince Maurice of Orange in the Netherlands, then still at peace with Spain under the Twelve Years' Truce. The following year, he raised his own army to serve Frederick V, Elector Palatine, suffering three significant setbacks in the following two years: at the Battle of Höchst (1622), the Battle of Fleurus (1622), and lastly the Battle of Stadtlohn (1623). Christian fought alongside the Count of Mansfeld in the first two engagements, a colleague with whom his relationship was so difficult that in 1622 they came close to fighting a duel. In the first and third he was beaten by Johan t'Serclaes, Count of Tilly.

In 1621, Christian was one of the few men to continue rallying behind Frederick V, who had only the year before claimed and been deposed from the throne of Bohemia following his crushing loss at the Battle of White Mountain. Frederick was still leader of the Protestant resistance rooted from the 1618 crushed Bohemian Revolution. What attracted Christian to the cause is arguable, but something that may have had to do with it was that before his campaigning, Christian declared a chivalric love for Elizabeth, Frederick's wife and daughter of James I of England, who at this point of the war had sent several thousand troops under Sir Horace Vere to the Palatinate.

By the end of 1621 he had managed to raise 10,000 troops, with whom he wintered in Westphalia, gathering a great treasure from the dioceses of Münster and Paderborn. Christian's military actions began in 1622 when Ernst von Mansfeld began organizing his forces and expressed interest in linking up with his army, especially after his ally Georg Friedrich, Margrave of Baden-Durlach, was crushingly defeated at the Battle of Wimpfen. They were caught at the Battle of Höchst, 22 June 1622, and although Christian was defeated, he was able to escape with much of his army despite crossing a river under heavy fire and losing all of his baggage. The newly united Protestant army moved into Alsace, leaving Heidelberg, the capital of the Palatinate, to fall to Count von Tilly in September 1622, effectively forcing Frederick V out of the war.

After intense foraging and ravaging of the Alsace region, Christian and Mansfeld moved north in Lorraine, and upon the news of the Spanish siege of Bergen op Zoom, they marched to the relief of the city, fighting the Battle of Fleurus (29 August 1622) and in the midst of the battle, Christian displayed his well-known courage and stubbornness on the field by leading four unsuccessful cavalry charges against the Spanish lines under Fernández de Córdoba. It was on the fifth charge that the Protestant horsemen broke through Spanish lines, which in the Protestant perspective paved the way for the relief of Bergen op Zoom that October. This came at a cost of most of Christian's infantry, all his baggage and artillery, and one of Christian's arms. After the amputation of his arm, Christian adopted the Latin motto Altera restat ("The other remains" or "I've still got the other one!").

The Battle of Fleurus was claimed as a victory by both sides: although the Protestant commanders fled headlong with their cavalry, abandoning their infantry, baggage and artillery on the field, so by any measure losing the battle itself, their surviving cavalry's ability to make it through to the Dutch Republic did in some measure contribute to the relieving of the Protestant stronghold of Bergen op Zoom, providing grounds to claim the encounter as a strategic victory — although modern historians regard it as having made little difference in that regard.

Fresh from that battle, Christian spent the winter of 1622–23 in the Spanish Netherlands resting and replenishing his army to what would in spring 1623 be set at roughly 15,000 men. He participated in a number of plunderings and burnings along the borders of France and Germany, in the Netherlands, and in north-west Germany.

Spring 1623 saw a plan between Christian, Mansfeld, the Prince of Transylvania Bethlen Gabor, and his ally Count Thurn to retake Bohemia for the Protestants and to breathe new life into the ailing Protestant cause. The campaign faltered from the start as the Count of Tilly received news of the troop movements and positioned himself in Lower Saxony, with reports from Mansfeld coming to Christian that he did not have the money to pay his armies or to campaign, leaving Christian to himself in the north. Outnumbered again, and leading an army that was not as disciplined as that of Tilly, Christian made a break for the relative safety of the United Provinces. He was outrun and outmaneuvered 10 miles short of the Dutch border, and in a stand typical of Christian's bravery, he was nonetheless decisively defeated at the Battle of Stadtlohn on 6 August 1623, when he lost all but 2,000 of this 15,000-man army. Broken, he fled for The Hague with the remnants of his army.

=== Defeat and death ===
Christian's defeat signalled the close of the "Palatine Phase" of the Thirty Years' War, and the end of the Protestant rebellion as a whole. Three days after Stadtlohn, Frederick V signed an armistice with Ferdinand II, ending the former's resistance to what seemed as impending Catholic domination of the Holy Roman Empire. Mansfeld shortly thereafter disbanded his army on the Rhine with the entrance of Denmark-Norway, the United Provinces, and England into the war in 1625. Under a plan that involved Christian, Mansfeld, and Christian IV, King of Denmark-Norway, pushing from the United Provinces and from Denmark-Norway, Christian found himself with ample financial backing. Ordered to advance on the Rhineland, he undertook this mission but quickly found himself checked by Tilly in Hesse, and opted this time to retreat rather than fight. Ill from the outset of the campaign, he died at Wolfenbüttel on 16 June 1626 at the age of 26.

== Ancestry ==
Ancestors of Christian the Younger of Brunswick

8. Henry V, Duke of Brunswick-Lüneburg
4. Julius, Duke of Brunswick-Lüneburg
9. Maria of Württemberg
2. Henry Julius, Duke of Brunswick-Wolfenbüttel
10. Joachim II Hector, Elector of Brandenburg
5. Hedwig of Brandenburg
11. Hedwig Jagiellon
1. Christian of Brunswick-Wolfenbüttel
12. Christian III of Denmark
6. Frederick II of Denmark
13. Dorothea of Saxe-Lauenburg
3. Elizabeth of Denmark
14. Ulrich III of Mecklenburg-Güstrow
7. Sophie of Mecklenburg-Güstrow
15. Elisabeth of Denmark

| Preceded by Rudolf (Administrator) | Bishop of Halberstadt; 1616-1623 (Administrator) | Succeeded by Christian William |
