= Battle of Fleurus =

There have been four battles fought near the town of Fleurus in Belgium:

- The Battle of Fleurus (1622) in the Thirty Years' War
- The Battle of Fleurus (1690) in the Nine Years' War
- The Battle of Fleurus (1794) in the French Revolutionary Wars
- The Battle of Ligny (Battle of Fleurus, 1815) in the Napoleonic Wars
