= Diet of Regensburg (1623) =

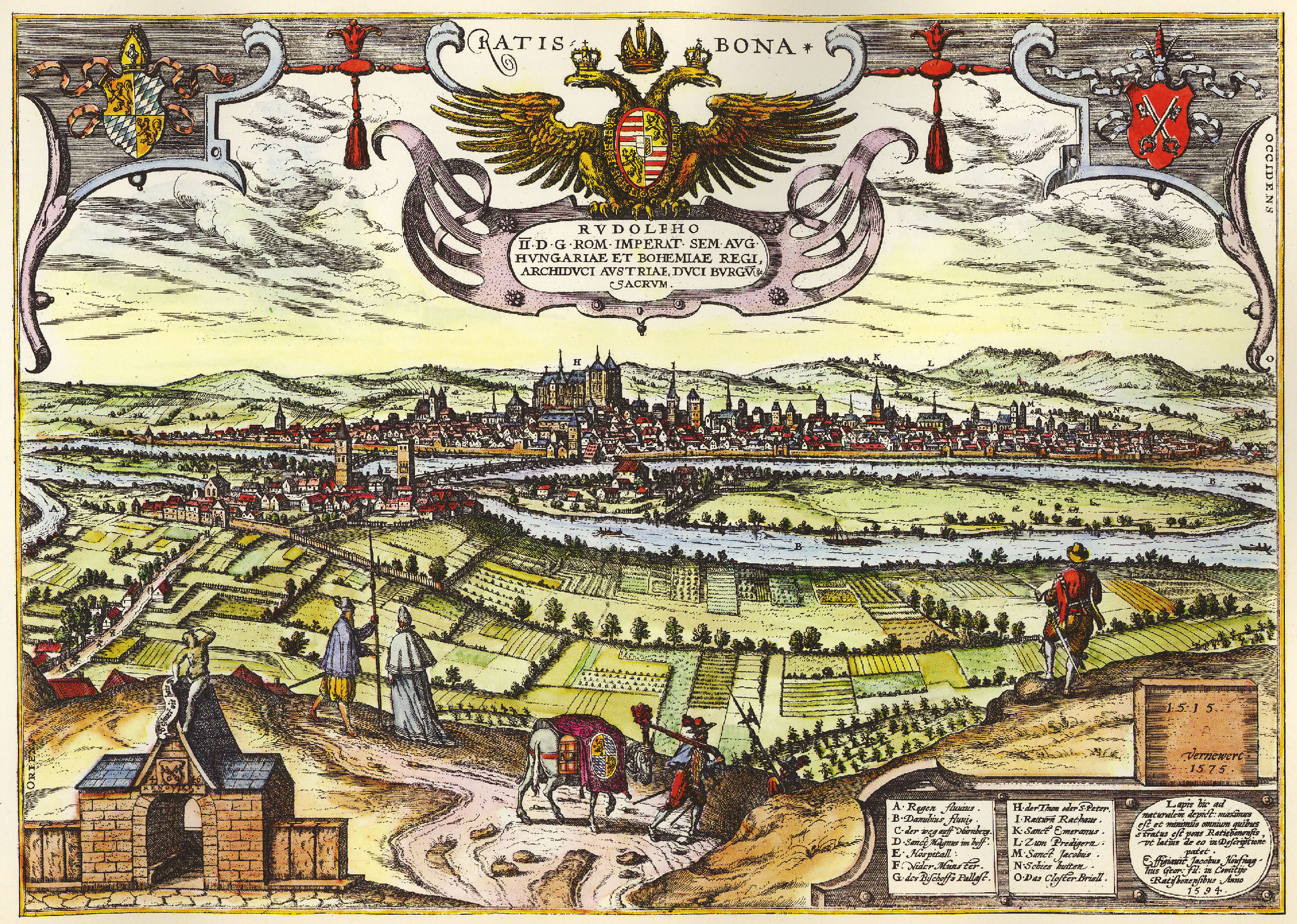
A view of Regensburg, c. 1600

The Diet of Regensburg of 1623 was a meeting of the Imperial States of the Holy Roman Empire (or Fürstentag) convened by Holy Roman Emperor Ferdinand II. The meeting was not technically an imperial diet in the full sense, but a convention of princes or Deputationstag – a looser constitutional format giving the emperor greater leeway to make decisions without being bound by formal procedures. At the meeting, the Electorate of the Palatinate was transferred to Maximilian I of Bavaria. The meeting marked the high-water mark of imperial power during the Thirty Years' War.

== Context ==
Frederick V, Prince-elector of the Rhine Palatinate, had been placed under the imperial ban for his role in the Bohemian Revolt of 1618–1621. His lands on the Rhine had been overrun by the army of Ferdinand's cousin Philip IV of Spain in the Palatinate campaign, and the Bohemian rebels had been defeated at the Battle of the White Mountain by an army led by another of the emperor's cousins, Duke Maximilian of Bavaria. The army of the German Catholic League, commanded by Johann Tserclaes, Count of Tilly, had defeated Frederick's allies Ernst von Mansfeld and Christian of Brunswick at the Battle of Wimpfen (6 May 1622) and Battle of Höchst (20 June 1622). It looked as though the Catholic forces had won the war, and the emperor wished to finalise Frederick's deprivation as an elector with the agreement of the leading princes. On 27 July 1622, the emperor called a convention of princes to be held in Regensburg late that year.

== Course ==
Emperor Ferdinand arrived in Regensburg on 24 November. He was joined within the next few days by Johann Schweikhard von Kronberg, Archbishop-Elector of Mainz, and Ferdinand of Bavaria, Archbishop-Elector of Cologne, and representatives of Lothar von Metternich, Archbishop-Elector of Trier (who did not attend in person for reasons of health). Both John George I, Elector of Saxony, and George William, Elector of Brandenburg, also sent representatives to the diet rather than take part in person, instead attending the funeral of Sophie of Brandenburg. The only major Protestant ruler to attend in person was Ludwig of Hesse-Darmstadt. The opening of the convention was delayed until 10 January, partly in the hope that more Protestant princes would decide to attend in person.

The Spanish ambassador to the imperial court, Count Oñate, also attended, as did the papal nuncio, Carlo Carafa.

The emperor presented the princes with several points for discussion: how to achieve a settled peace in the wake of the Bohemian Revolt and its ramifications; the funding of defences of the Hungarian frontier with the Ottoman Empire; security on the border with the Dutch Republic, then engaged in an ongoing war with Philip IV of Spain; issues of jurisdiction and jurisprudence within the empire, particularly in the Reichskammergericht; and the control of inflation within the empire.

The first point included the transfer of electoral dignity from Frederick to Maximilian. This was the main and most contentious issue before the diet, with the Protestant princes, Archbishop Schweikhard of Mainz, and the Spanish ambassador all opposing the transfer. As it would secure a permanent Catholic majority in imperial elections, the papal nuncio was among the transfer's foremost proponents. Spain and the Archbishop of Mainz both argued that it would make it harder to achieve lasting peace with the Protestant princes. Schweikhard was eventually won over by a compromise agreement reached on 21 February that the transfer would not be in perpetuity, but solely for the lifetime of Duke Maximilian personally.

While the representatives of the Lutheran princes recognised the emperor's right to place Frederick under the imperial ban, they argued that the electoral transfer could only go ahead with the unanimous consent of the other electors, and that a lasting peace could only be secured by showing clemency, recommending the restoration of Frederick's German lands to his heirs, and a general amnesty for Bohemian Protestants.

The emperor rejected calls for amnesty and asked the participants to respond in writing to the proposals he had placed before them, with the question of funding the Hungarian frontier to be held over for a future diet. As no final response could be agreed among the participants, three different responses were submitted: one from the Catholic electors and princes, one from the representatives of Saxony and Brandenburg, and a third from the landgrave of Hesse-Darmstadt. The Catholics advised that Frederick be stripped of the electoral dignity but should be received back into favour if he made a formal submission and declaration of obedience, with a future assembly to settle the issue of his territory and other titles. The representatives of Saxony and Brandenburg maintained their earlier position that the electoral transfer would make a lasting peace settlement more difficult to attain. The landgrave insisted that the electoral transfer was a question for the college of electors, and petitioned that the Lutheran churches in Prague should be reopened as a prerequisite for a lasting peace.

The emperor accepted that clemency would be extended to Frederick if he submitted without delay and made a declaration of obedience, but insisted that he had permanently forfeited any personal right to take part in imperial elections, and that questions of succession to his lands would be a matter for a future assembly. The electoral dignity was to be transferred to Maximilian, but to revert to Frederick's heir or successor after Maximilian's death.

== Results ==
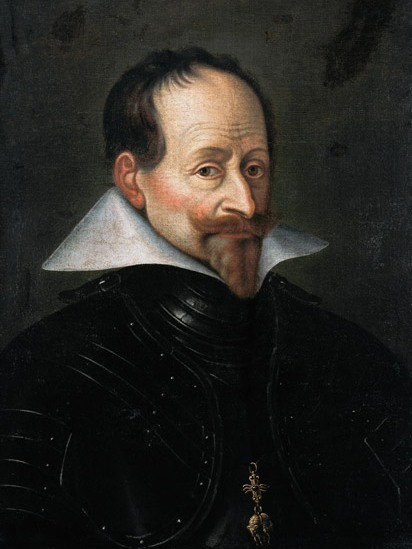
Maximilian, Duke of Bavaria from 1597 and imperial elector from 1623

Maximilian was invested with electoral dignity at a ceremony held on 25 February.

Since Frederick of the Palatinate's children and heirs by Elizabeth Stuart were grandchildren of James I of England, the electoral transfer was expected to lead to greater English involvement in the Thirty Years' War. This ultimately led to Sir Charles Morgan's expedition of 1627 in support of Christian IV of Denmark.

== Bibliography ==
- (in German) Gerhard Taddey: "Regensburger Kurfürstentag". In: Ders.: Lexikon der deutschen Geschichte. 2.überarb. Aufl. Stuttgart, 1982 ISBN 3-520-80002-0 S.1016
- (in German) Johannes Burkhardt: Der Dreißigjährige Krieg. Frankfurt am Main, 1992 S.93
- (in Latin) Acta Ratisbonensia (1623), available on Google Books
