= Capture of Bacharach =

1620 battle of the Thirty Years' War

Coordinates: 50°04′0″N 07°46′0″E

- Part of the Palatinate phase of the Thirty Years' War
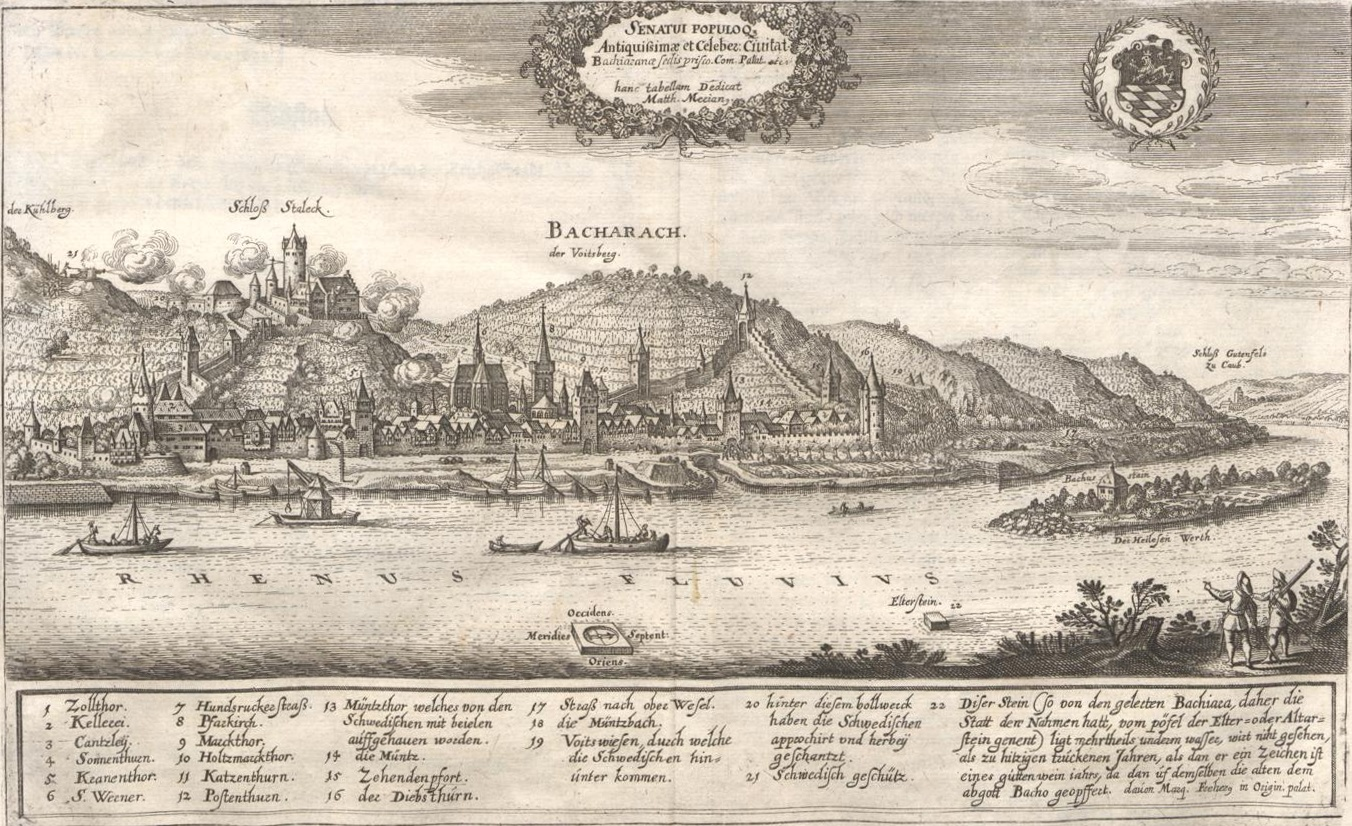
- View of Bacharach by Matthäus Merian
Date	1 October 1620
Location	Bacharach, Electorate of the Palatinate (present-day Germany)
Result	Spanish victory

Belligerents
Palatinate	Spain

Commanders and leaders
Frederick V	(Spain) Gonzalo Fernández de Córdoba

Strength
2,500	2,500–5,000

Casualties and losses
Entire garrison surrendered	3 dead and 3 wounded

The Capture of Bacharach took place on 1 October 1620 at Bacharach, Electorate of the Palatinate. The conflict was between the Spanish forces commanded by Don Gonzalo Fernández de Córdoba and the Protestant forces of Frederick V, Elector Palatine, during the Palatinate campaign in the context of the Thirty Years' War. After a quick start of the invasion of states of Frederick V, proclaimed King of Bohemia, the operations slowed in mid-September, after the Capture of Oppenheim. Don Ambrosio Spinola, the Spanish general in command, assessed at a council of war the choice between undertaking the siege of Heidelberg or, secondarily, the town of Bacharach. The Spanish officers decided to take Bacharach due to the small number of Frederick's scattered forces. On 1 October Córdoba captured Bacharach with a force of 2,500 soldiers, forcing the Anglo-German defenders to surrender.

== Background ==
After securing stores of food and ammunition through the Capture of Oppenheim, Spinola had a choice between taking Heidelberg or Bacharach. On 23 September Spinola consulted with the Spanish commanders, Don Carlos Coloma, Don Gonzalo Fernández de Córdoba, Don Diego Felípez de Guzmán, and Hendrik van den Bergh. There was talk of marching on Heidelberg, Frankenthal, or Bacharach, but finally Spinola decided to opt for Bacharach.

Bacharach was an important strategic point because it was a bridgehead over the Rhine and would be a link between the part of the Palatinate occupied by the Spaniards and the city of Mainz. In addition, the operation would buy time for the arrival of reinforcements expected from the Spanish Netherlands. On 27 September, news came to Spinola that a force from the United Provinces of about 5,000 men under the command of Frederick Henry of Nassau and Sir Horace Vere had crossed the Moselle in Karden to support Frederick V.

Spinola, ignoring the entity of Vere's forces, composed of Dutch, English, and Scottish volunteers sent by King James I of England, decided to move with his army to the west bank of the Rhine and await the Protestant forces. With his attention centered on the arrival of the Anglo-Dutch relief, Spinola remained near the road with the bulk of his army, and entrusted the capture of Bacharach to Don Gonzalo Fernández de Córdoba.

== Battle ==
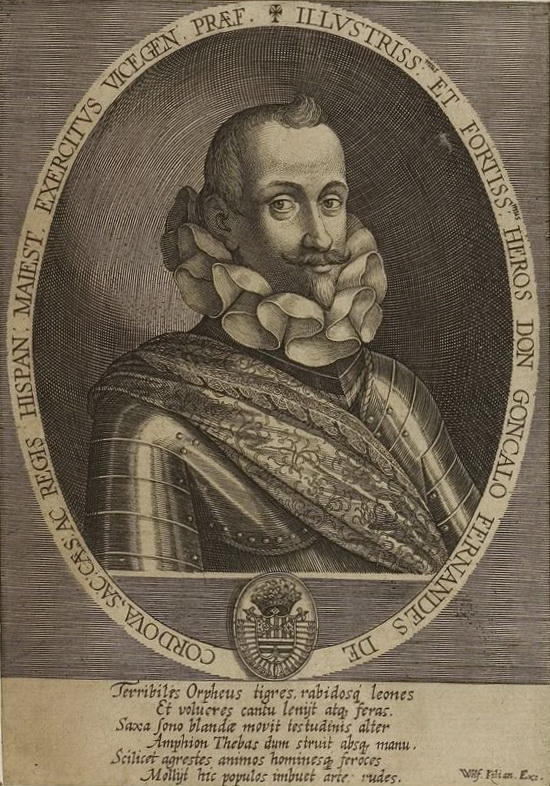
Don Gonzalo Fernández de Córdoba

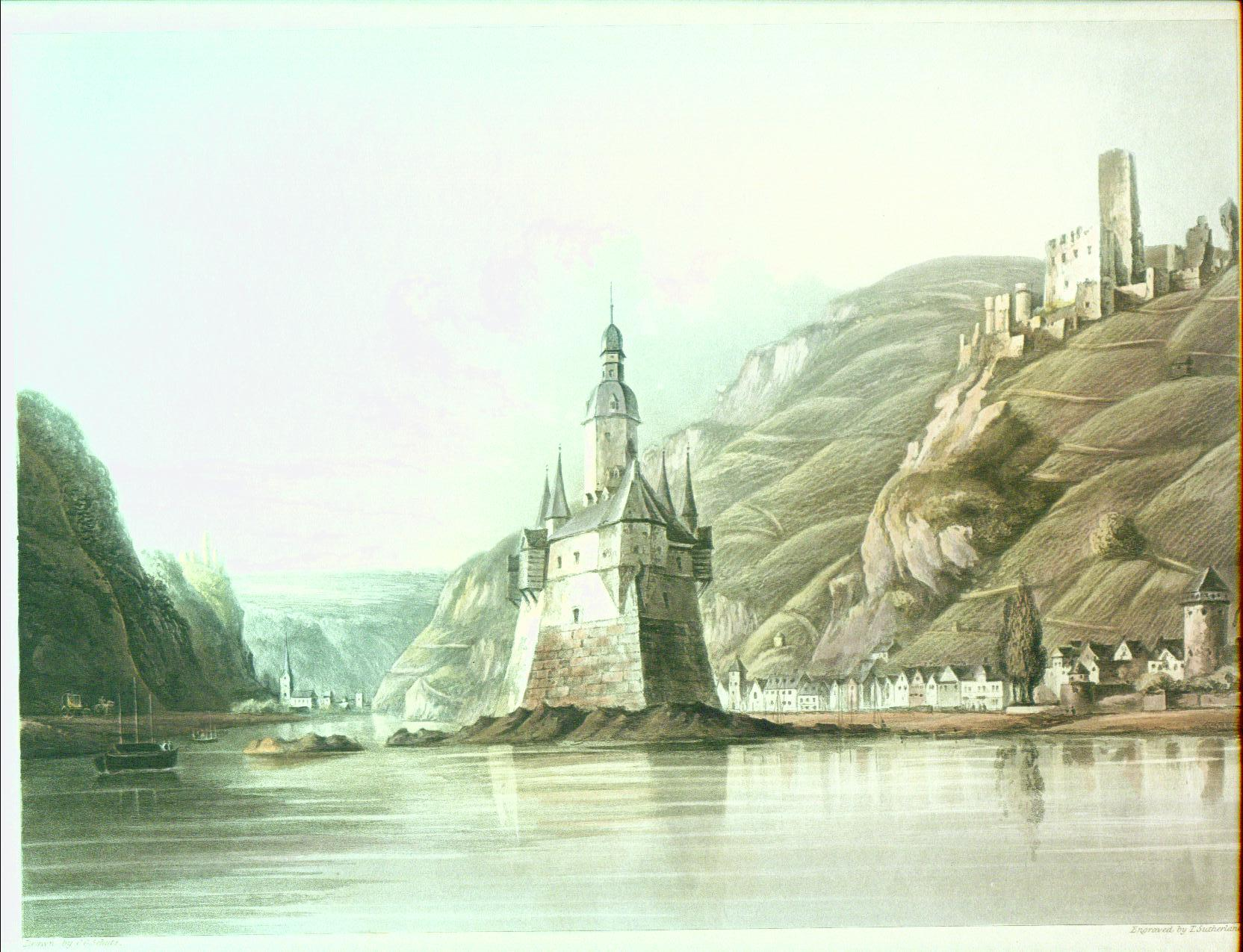
View of Kaub and Pfalzgrafenstein Castle

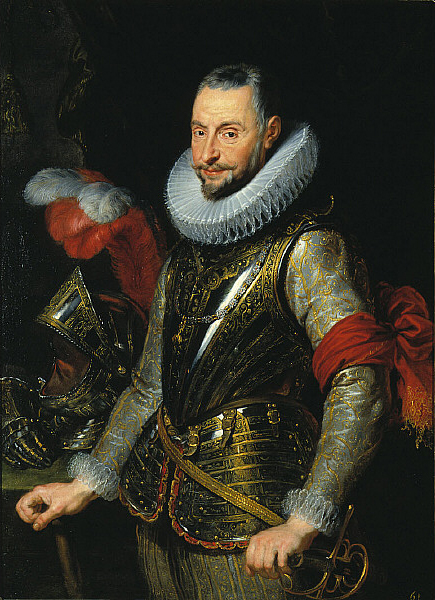
Don Ambrosio Spinola by Peter Paul Rubens

On 29 September Córdoba marched with his forces and captured Lorch, forcing the few defenders to surrender. He had also sent another group of about 2,000 men directly to Bacharach. This group approached the outskirts of Bacharach at about 2 am. With the arrival of the Spaniards, the Protestant soldiers outside the town threw down their muskets and fled into the town. Córdoba's men then proceeded to build a bulwark behind the town.

At dawn, the defenders, aided by heavy mist, fired shots of musket, killing three Spaniards and wounding three more. Shortly thereafter the bulk of the forces led by Córdoba arrived. Demoralised by the arrival of the Spanish, the officers of the garrison decided to surrender. The Spanish troops entered Bacharach at 3 pm. Two captains and 94 English soldiers, among other German troops, were taken prisoners.

== Aftermath ==
Córdoba left a garrison of 300 soldiers in Bacharach and sent most of his troops under the commanders Diego Ruiz and Baltasar de Santander to capture Kaub. The small garrison of that town soon surrendered. Shortly thereafter, the Spaniards took the Pfalzgrafenstein Castle. Spinola, meanwhile, focused on intercepting the Anglo-Dutch relief, but the Protestant force did not appear. The Anglo-Dutch force went instead to Worms unhindered.

In August 1621, Mainz fell to Spinola's army of 15,000 men, now under the command of Córdoba. Meanwhile, General Spinola, on his return to the Netherlands where the Eighty Years' War was still going on, lay siege to Jülich, and after five months of siege the city fell to the Spaniards, reversing Maurice's success of 1610.

== See also ==
- Thirty Years' War
- Army of Flanders
