= Gröningen Priory =

German Benedictine monastery, 936–1542

Coordinates: 51°56′14″N 11°11′49″E

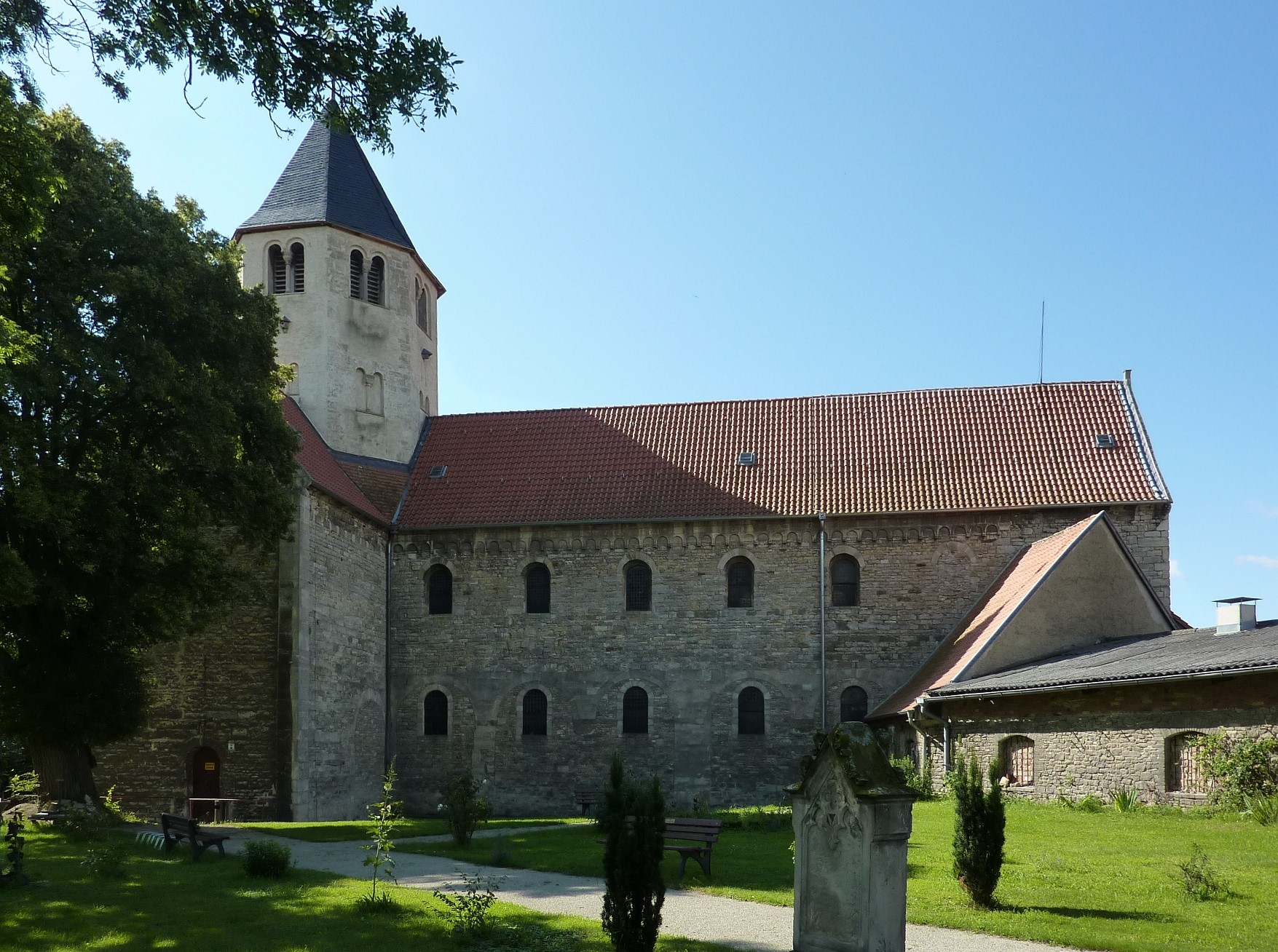
St Vitus abbey church

Gröningen Priory (German: Kloster Gröningen) was a Benedictine monastery, located west of Gröningen in present-day Saxony-Anhalt, Germany. The abbey church is part of the Romanesque Road scenic route.

== History ==
The monastery was founded upon the death of King Henry the Fowler in 936 by the Saxon count Siegfried of Merseburg, brother of Margrave Gero the Great, and his second wife Guthia (Jutta) at their residence on the Bode river. Its first monks were sent by Volkmar I, abbot of Corvey, of which Gröningen was a priory. It was vested with extended estates in the Saxon Harzgau, which later became part of the Prince-Bishopric of Halberstadt. After the last Catholic provost retired from office in 1542, the priory was dissolved in the course of the Protestant Reformation. The monks took the relics with them back to Corvey, the Gröningen lands were leased, and large parts of the monastery complex were demolished.

A building of particular interest is the preserved monastery church of Saint Vitus, set on a slight eminence. It was dedicated on St Vitus' Day in 940 by Abbot Volkmar of Corvey and from about 1070 re-built in the style of Hirsau Abbey as a Romanesque basilica with three aisles and a number of features of architectural interest. Of particular note is the very unusual octagonal crossing tower, similar to Armenian architecture, and the relief of Christ Pantocrator on a balustrade from the 12th century, a copy whose original is kept at the sculpture collection of the Bode Museum in Berlin.
