= Gonzalo Fernández de Córdoba (1585–1635) =

Spanish military leader

Don General Gonzalo Fernández de Córdoba Prince of Maratea
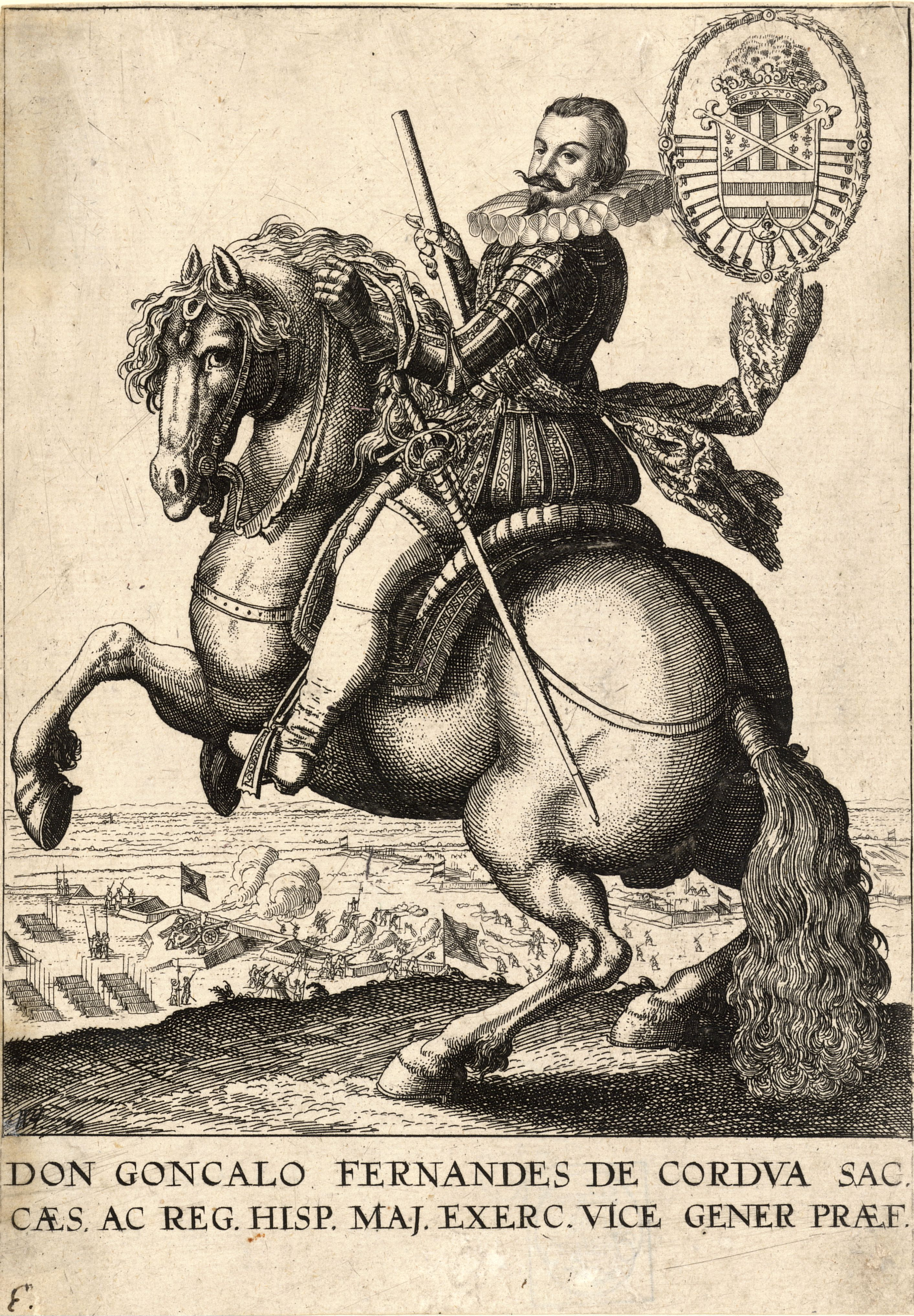
- Engraving of Gonzalo Fernández de Córdoba

Governor of the Duchy of Milan
- In office 31 March 1626 – 16 July 1629
- Monarch: Philip IV of Spain
- Valido: Count-Duke of Olivares
- Preceded by: Gómez Suárez de Figueroa
- Succeeded by: Ambrosio Spinola

Personal details
- Born: 31 December 1585 Cabra, Province of Córdoba, Spain
- Died: 16 February 1635 (aged 49) Montalbán, Spain
- Parent: Antonio Fernández de Córdoba Cardona y Requesens (father)

Military service
- Allegiance: Spanish Empire
- Branch/service: (Spanish Empire) Spanish Army
- Years of service: 1612–1634
- Rank: General
- Battles/wars: War of the Montferrat Succession Eighty Years' War: Siege of Breda; Capture of Maastricht; Thirty Years' War: Battle of Fleurus; Palatinate campaign; Capture of Bacharach; Battle of Wimpfen; Siege of Heidelberg; War of the Mantuan Succession

Gonzalo Fernández de Córdoba y Cardona-Anglesola (31 December 1585 – 16 February 1635) was one of the main Spanish military leaders during the Eighty Years' War, Thirty Years' War, and the War of the Mantuan Succession.

== Early life ==
His full name was Gonzalo Andrés Domingo Fernández de Córdoba y Cardona-Anglesola. He was born at Cabra, in what is now the Province of Córdoba and was the third son of Antonio Fernández de Córdoba Cardona y Requesens, the Duke of Soma and was great grandchild of his namesake Gonzalo Fernández de Córdoba, the Great Capitan.

== Career ==
He initiated his military career under Álvaro II de Bazán in 1612, defeating the Ottomans at La Goulette. He later served with Pedro de Toledo Osorio in the War of the Montferrat Succession, fighting a successful campaign.

=== Involvement in the Thirty Years War ===
During the Thirty Years' War, he served under Ambrogio Spinola before replacing him at the command. He became one of the principal generals in the Catholic alliance along with the Imperial general Johann Tserclaes, Count of Tilly, fighting in the successful battle of Wimpfen. His army was later replaced by that of Tommaso Caracciolo, who defeated the remnants of the opposition in Hochst.

From 1621 to 1623 he commanded units of the Army of Flanders in the Palatinate, and Flanders, and defeated the Anglo-German Protestant forces in the sieges of Bacharach and Heidelberg and the Dutch at Fleurus.

In 1624 was awarded the title of the first Prince of Maratea by King Philip IV of Spain, and in 1630 he was awarded the title of Prince of the Holy Roman Empire by the Emperor Ferdinand II.

=== Duchy of Milan ===
From 1625 to 1629 he was Governor of the Duchy of Milan. In 1628 he took part in the War of the Mantuan Succession, but complained he had not been given sufficient resources. When he failed to take Casale and stop the French invasion in 1629, he was called back to Madrid and court-martialed. He was replaced by Spinola, who died shortly after.

== Later life and death ==
He was reinstated a few years later and sent to the Netherlands in 1632. Here he conducted operations on the lower Rhine in the rear of the victorious army of Gustavus Adolphus, but he was unable to prevent the Capture of Maastricht by Frederick Henry, Prince of Orange. He was recalled to Spain in 1633 and died at Montalbán in 1635, without having been married, and with no issue.

== Portrayal in classic literature ==
He is also a character in the novel The Betrothed, where Alessandro Manzoni describes the anger of the Milanese populace towards him, when he leaves Milan in 1629.

Government offices
Preceded by Gómez Suárez de Figueroa, 3rd Duke of Feria	Governor of the Duchy of Milan; 1625-1629	Succeeded by Ambrogio Spinola, 1st Marquis of the Balbases
