= Battle of Fleurus (1622) =

1622 battle of the Thirty Years' War

Coordinates: 50.4830°N 4.5500°E

- Part of the Eighty Years' War and the Palatinate phase of the Thirty Years' War
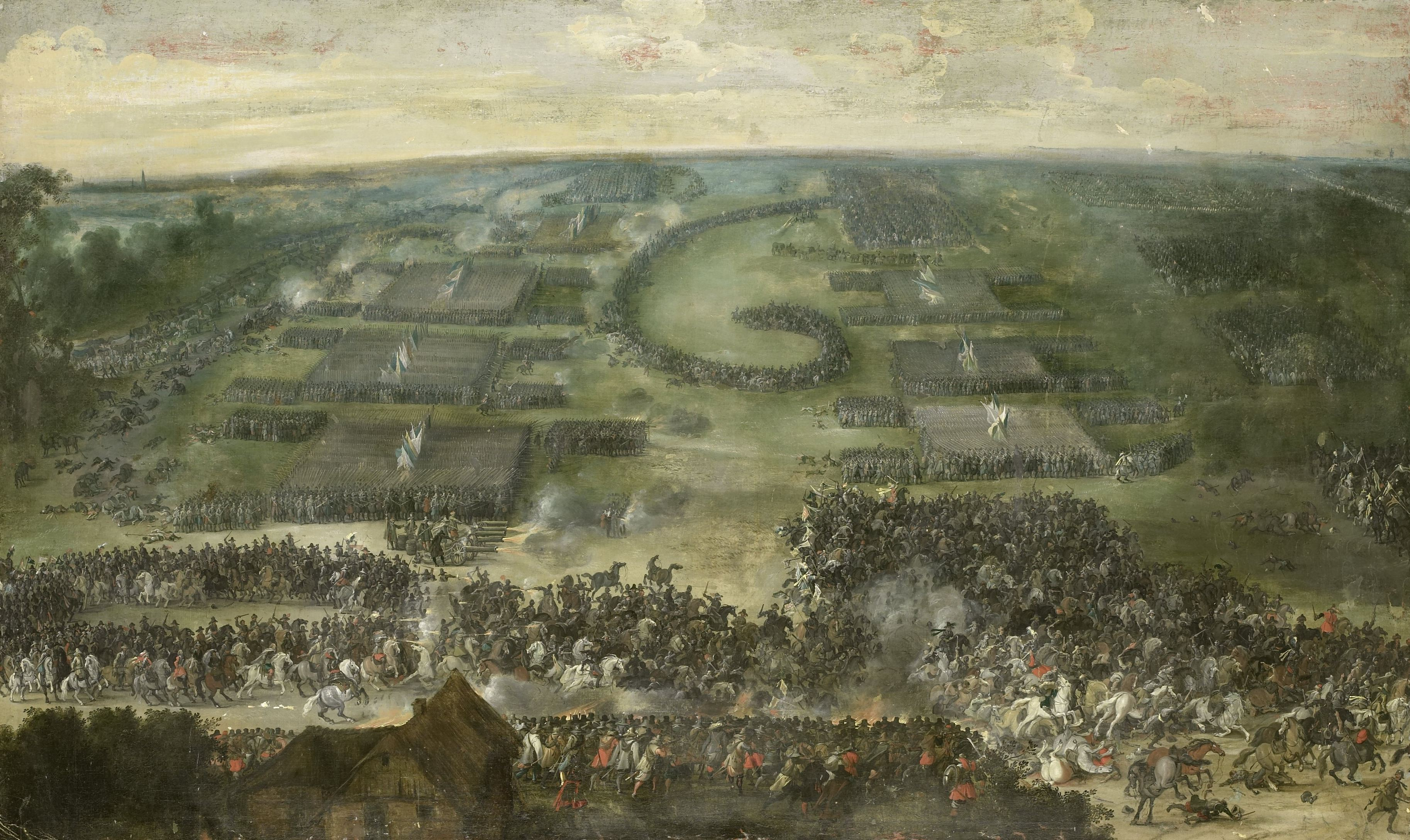
- The Battle of Fleurus 1622 by Peter Snayers
| Date | 29 August 1622 |
| Location | Fleurus, Spanish Netherlands (modern Belgium) |
| Result | Spanish victory |

Belligerents
| Dutch Republic | Spanish Empire |

Commanders and leaders
| (Dutch Republic) Ernst von Mansfeld (Dutch Republic) Christian of Brunswick | (Spanish Empire) Gonzalo Fernández de Córdoba |

Strength
| c. 14,000, 11 guns | c. 8,000, 4 guns |

Casualties and losses
| 5,000 dead, wounded or captured | 500–1,000 dead or wounded |

The Battle of Fleurus, 29 August 1622, took place during the Thirty Years' War near Fleurus in Belgium, then part of the Spanish Netherlands. A Spanish army commanded by Córdoba defeated a larger Protestant mercenary force under Ernst von Mansfeld and Christian of Brunswick.

== Campaign ==
After failing to relieve Heidelberg, besieged by Tilly's army, Frederick V, Elector Palatine, decided to disband his army. On July 13, 1622, the contract was cancelled and the unemployed army of Mansfeld and Christian of Brunswick was hired by the Dutch to help in the relief of the siege of Bergen-op-Zoom. The Protestant army departed from Alsace and at a fast pace crossed Northern France, entering the Spanish Low Countries through Hainaut.

The Spanish Army of Flanders, under command of Ambrogio Spinola, engaged in the siege of Bergen-op-Zoom, a town on the estuary of the Schelde River, was in a dangerous position; while a relieving Dutch army was being assembled to the East at Breda he faced an invasion from the South. He was in danger of being trapped between the two enemy armies, his line of retreat towards Antwerp blocked by the invading German army. To stop that army Gonzalo Fernández de Córdoba, commander of the Spanish army in the Palatinate, was recalled in a hurry from the siege of Heidelberg. Cordoba marched through the Duchy of Luxembourg and the difficult terrain of the Ardennes, and was able to intercept Mansfeld and Brunswick on the border of Brabant.

The Protestant army advance guard met Spanish cavalry scouts on 27 August, and two days later they found Córdoba's army entrenched. Córdoba, much weaker in cavalry, had assumed a blocking position north of the town of Mellet, near Fleurus, with flanks supported by woods. The Protestant commanders deployed their army to try to break through the Spanish position.

== Armies ==
Cavalry arquebussiers, unlike dragoons, fired from horseback, and were a light cavalry much favoured by the Army of Flanders.

=== Spanish army ===
The Spanish cavalry was composed of 53 small companies, assembled into ad hoc squadrons. There were 29 cuirassier companies and 24 arquebusier companies. 4 of the cuirassier companies were composed of veterans, while the rest had been raised, using Walloon recruits, in 1621 and 1622. These latter had performed poorly at the Battle of Wimpfen, so Cordoba was obviously concerned about the flanks of his army.

The Spanish infantry was of mixed quality. It included the elite Tercio of Naples, which traced its history back to 1567, and had recently lived up to its reputation with a superb performance at the Battle of Wimpfen. Córdoba placed it in the post of honour to the right, blocking the road. The Fugger Regiment and Verdugo Tercio were also experienced units, veterans of the Bohemian campaign, while the rest of the units were garrison troops of lesser quality mobilized by Córdoba to fill his command.

Cuirassier, this heavy cavalry formed the backbone of the Protestant Army.

'Right wing
Commander: Gauchier
800 commanded musketeers (in the woods)
5 Cavalry Squadrons in two lines

Center
Commander: Córdoba
Several units brigaded into 4 Escuadrones deployed in a single line
1st Escuadron
Tercio of Naples (16 companies, Spaniards)
Tercio Balanzon (2 companies, Burgundians)
Tercio Verdugo (15 companies, Walloons)
2nd Escuadron
Isenburg Regiment (10 companies, Lower Rhine Germans)
Emden Regiment (1 company, Northern Germans)
4 Free Companies (French)
3rd Escuadron
Tercio of Capua (14 companies, Italians)
4th Escuadron
Fugger Regiment (7 companies, Germans)

Left wing
Commander: De Sylva
4 Cavalry Squadrons in two lines

=== Protestant army ===
The Protestant army had left Sedan with 25,000 men, but the swift march had reduced it to 14,000, many stragglers being killed by angry Walloon peasants.

Protestant cavalry was highly motivated and of good quality. Many of the recruits were members of the German lesser nobility, and most were heavily armoured cuirassiers. The infantry was of much lesser material, poorly equipped, and had suffered the most in the march.

Right wing
Commander: Streiff
10 Companies of Cavalry deployed in two lines

Center
Commander: Mansfeld
26 understrength Infantry regiments brigaded into 8 composite Battalions deployed in a checkerboard double line

Left wing
Commander: Brunswick
50 Companies of Cavalry deployed in two lines

== Battle ==
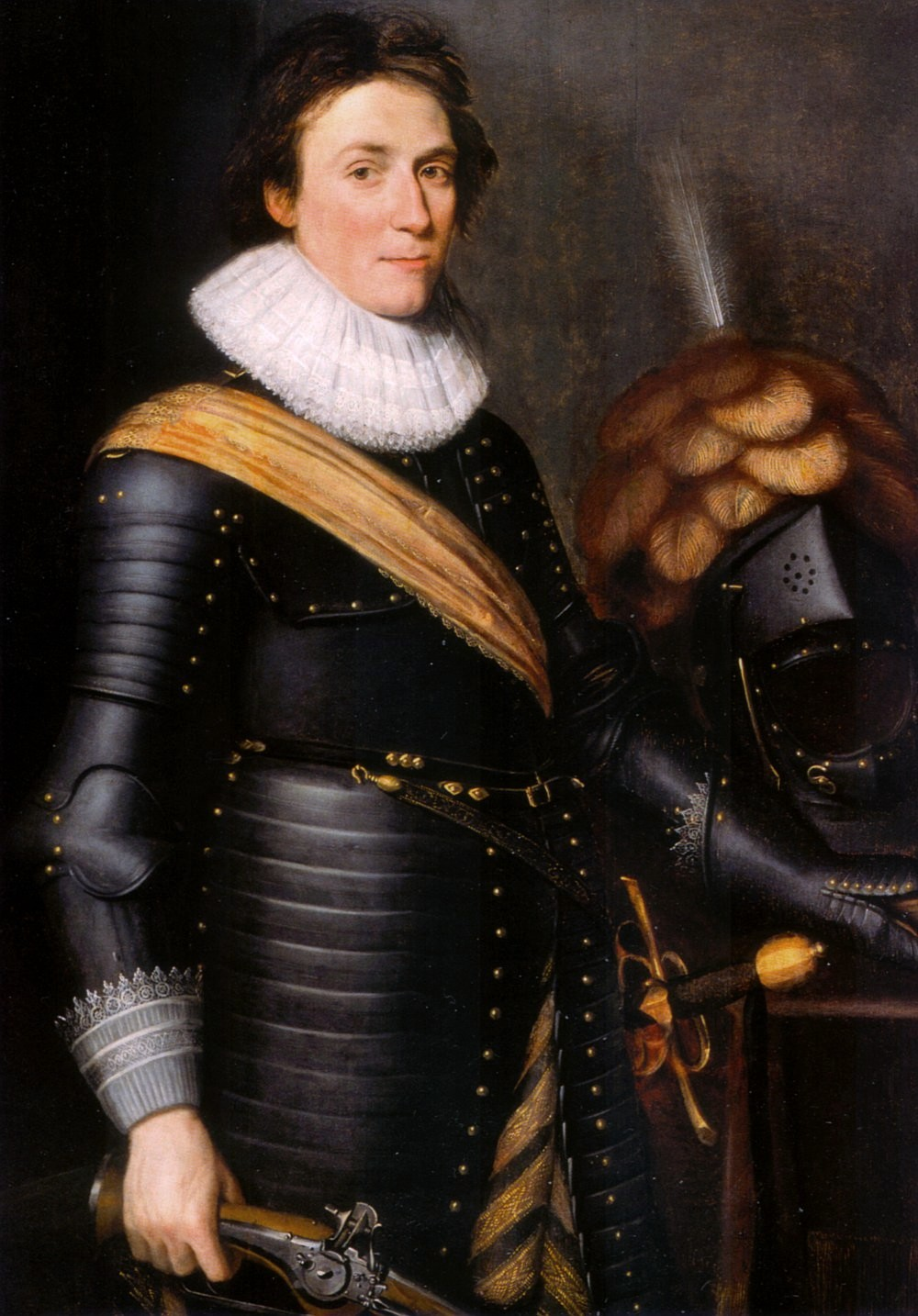
Christian the Younger of Brunswick, Duke of Brunswick-Lüneburg and Bishop of Halberstadt.

After a short cannonade, Mansfeld ordered a general advance. Some gaps opened up in the poorly drilled German infantry, and De Sylva attacked an exposed flank, routing one Battalion. However, Streiff counterattacked, the Walloon cavalry was wrong footed and suffered considerable damage from enemy pistol fire. De Sylva's cavalry took refuge behind the baggage wagons, while Streiff turned on the Spanish infantry, but without much success.

On the Protestant left, Brunswick had massed most of his cavalry, Córdoba's deployment made it impossible to outflank his position, but Brunswick hoped to overwhelm the Spanish by a massed frontal assault. The first charge was repulsed by Gauchier's cavalry, but Brunswick reordered his command and launched a second charge, the first line was repulsed again but the second line succeeded in pushing back the Walloon Horse.

Brunswick turned then against the Spanish infantry, but his own infantry failed to adequately support the attack, the Tercio of Naples held its ground, and murderous enfilade fire from musketeers ambushed in the nearby woods sent the Protestant cavalry reeling back in disorder.

In a final charge, Brunswick was wounded, and his cavalry, demoralised, finally fell back. After five hours of fighting, Mansfeld ordered a general retreat, it was midday and he intended to take the road through Liège around Córdoba to reach Breda.

The Spanish army was too tired to follow the enemy. The next day, Córdoba sent Gauchier with the cavalry, although it caught up with the rear guard of the Protestant army, it managed to continue its march, defeat a small local army trying to block it, and rally at Tongeren. From there it started a six-hour night march to Breda, reaching it exhausted and without much of its equipment. Within days however the Dutch had re-equipped the circa 10,000 left in Mansfeld's army from state arsenals.

== Aftermath ==
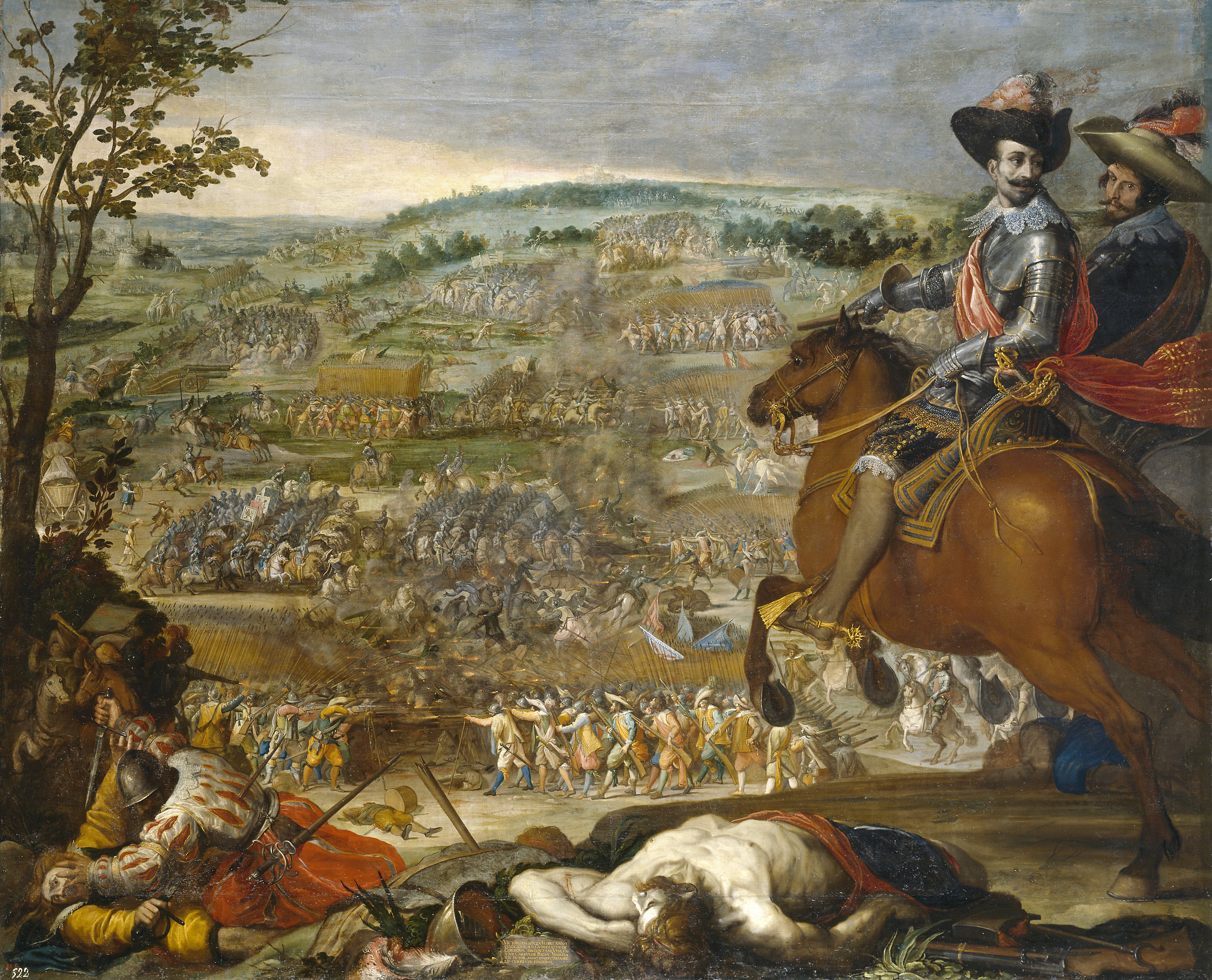
The Victory of Fleurus, a painting by Vicente Carducho, originally displayed in the Salón de Reinos, Madrid

As the Spanish army had failed to block Brunswick and Mansfeld, Spinola was compelled to lift the siege of Bergen-op-Zoom, but the outcome of Fleurus meant he was not in risk of being enveloped anymore, allowing him to retreat safely with his baggage train. Brunswick and Mansfeld only served for three months in Dutch pay, their unruly bands having no place in the disciplined Dutch army. Meanwhile, Tilly's army easily overran the Palatinate.
