= Battle of Wimpfen =

1622 battle of the Thirty Years' War

Coordinates: 49°11′50″N 9°10′20″E

- Part of the Palatinate phase of the Thirty Years' War
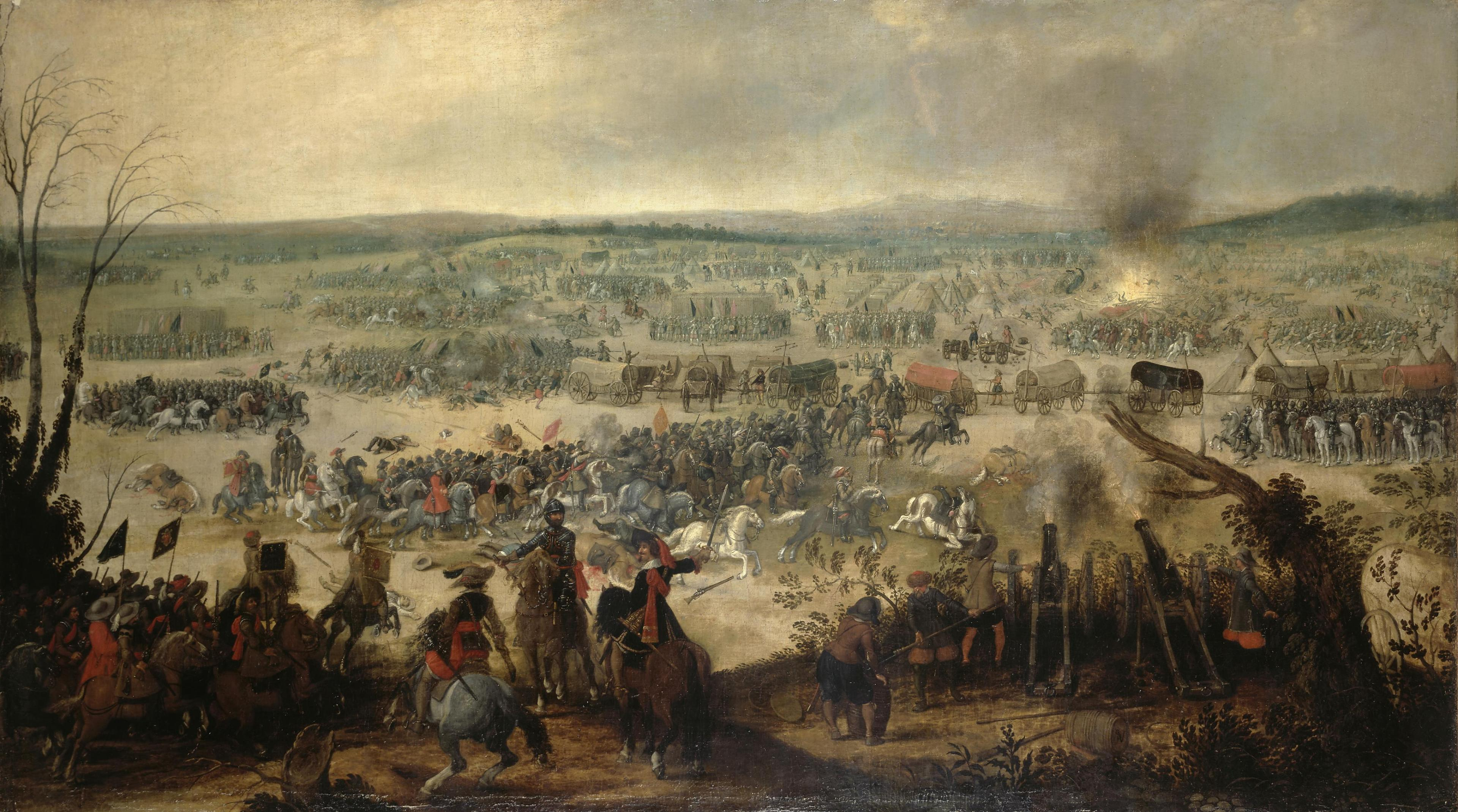
- Battle of Wimpfen, painting by S. Vrancx showing the magazine explosion
Date	6 May 1622
Location	Wimpfen, Swabian Circle, Holy Roman Empire present-day Baden-Württemberg, Germany
Result	Catholic victory

Belligerents
(Grand Duchy of Baden) Margraviate of Baden-Durlach; Electoral Palatinate	Holy Roman Empire; Catholic League (Spain) Spanish Empire

Commanders and leaders
(Grand Duchy of Baden) Georg Friedrich von Baden (WIA)	Count of Tilly (Spain) Gonzalo Fernández de Córdoba

Strength
12,700 Two 60-pounder guns, one 70-pounder, 20 of a mixture of 3-, 5-, 6-, and 8-pounders, 6 "newly cast' guns, and 9 half culverins	Approx: 15,650+ 8,700 infantry, 900 cavalry, seven 12 pounders, and 1 half culverin with Tilly. 5,200 infantry, 850 cavalry, and five 8-pounders with Spanis.

Casualties and losses
3,000+	1,800+
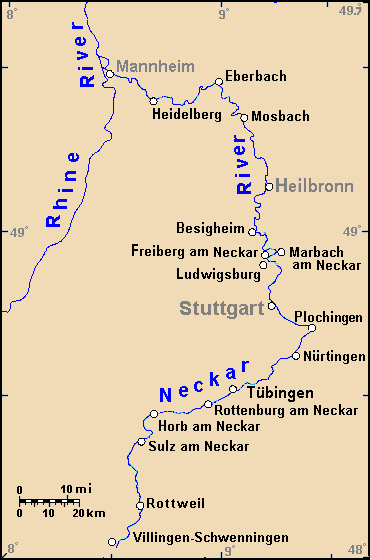
- Location within Neckar region Wimpfen (Baden-Württemberg) Wimpfen (Germany)

The Battle of Wimpfen took place during the Palatinate campaign period of the Thirty Years' War on 6 May 1622 near Wimpfen.

The combined forces of the Catholic League and the Spanish Empire under Marshal Tilly and Gonzalo de Córdoba defeated the Protestant forces of Georg Friedrich, Margrave of Baden.

== Background ==
=== Bohemian Revolt ===
In the Bohemian Revolt phase of the Thirty Years' War, the Protestant Bohemian nobility refused to confirm Catholic Ferdinand II as their king and had offered Count Frederick V of the Palatinate the crown of Bohemia. Frederick was crowned in 1619 but lost the kingdom to Catholic League troops under General Tilly at the Battle of the White Mountain in 1620.

Due to disunity among Protestant princes the Protestant Union was forced to declare its neutrality in the conflict in the Treaty of Ulm in 1620 and dissolved the following year.

=== Palatinate campaign ===
Count Georg Friedrich, Margrave of Baden had been one of the Protestant Union's generals and maintained the mercenary army he had raised.

When General Tilly moved the Catholic League army from Bavaria towards the Palatinate in April 1622 to continue the war against Frederick V, Georg Friedrich declared for Frederick's cause. He marched his army to join General Mansfeld's troops and met with them a few days after their victory against Tilly at the Battle of Mingolsheim on April 27.

By early May, the forces of Christian of Brunswick had arrived to the north of the Neckar River and were prepared to assist their fellow Protestants. While Mansfeld crossed the Neckar at Heidelberg to join with Brunswick and besiege the Spanish garrison at Ladenburg, Georg Friedrich pursued Tilly's army who were retreating east towards the Neckar crossing at Wimpfen. Unknown to the Protestants, a Spanish army under General Córdoba had reinforced Tilly with several thousand men in the meantime.

Late on May 5, the Protestant troops, coming from the southwest, crossed a small creek (called Böllinger Bach) near the village of Obereisesheim and formed up in battle lines.

== Battle ==
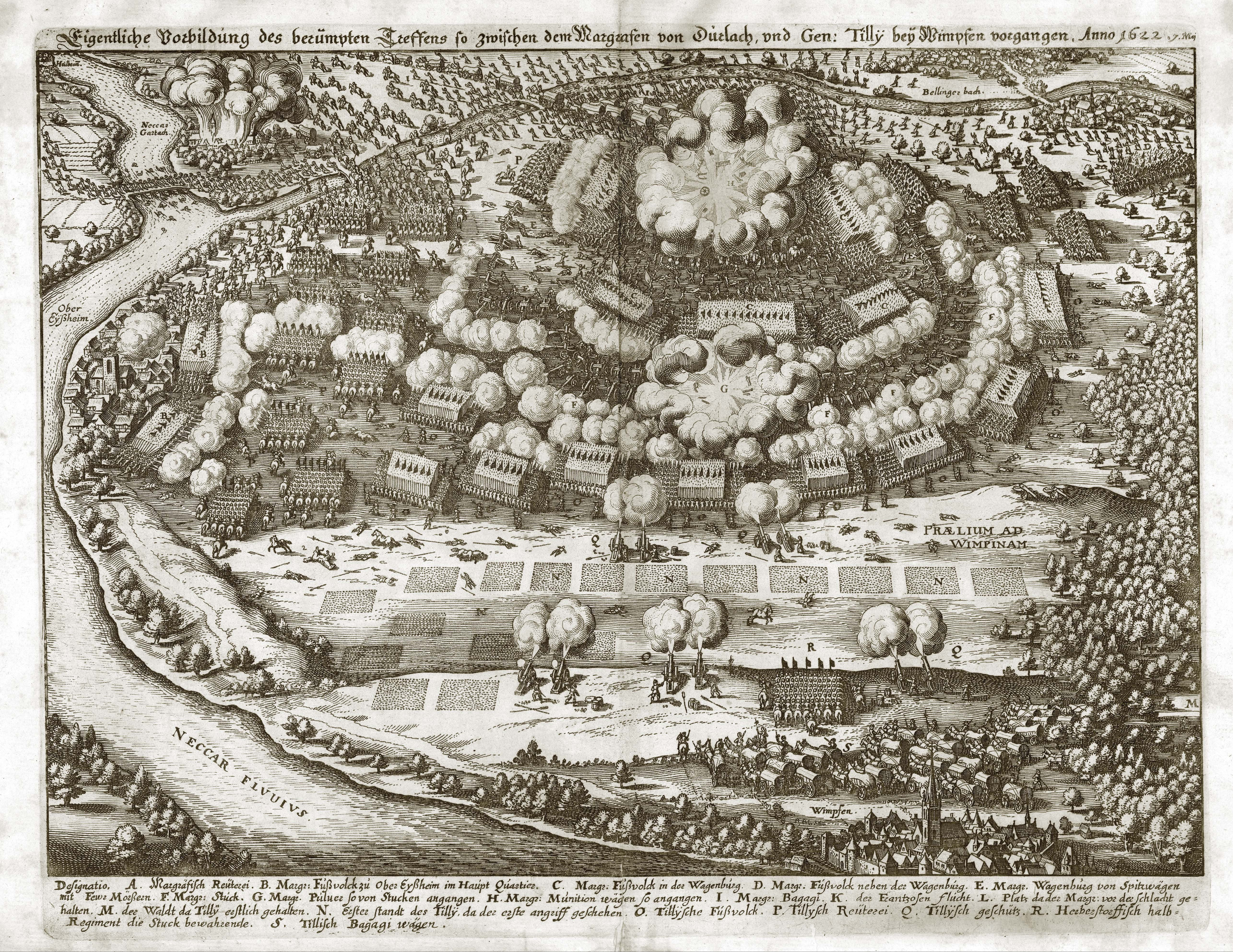
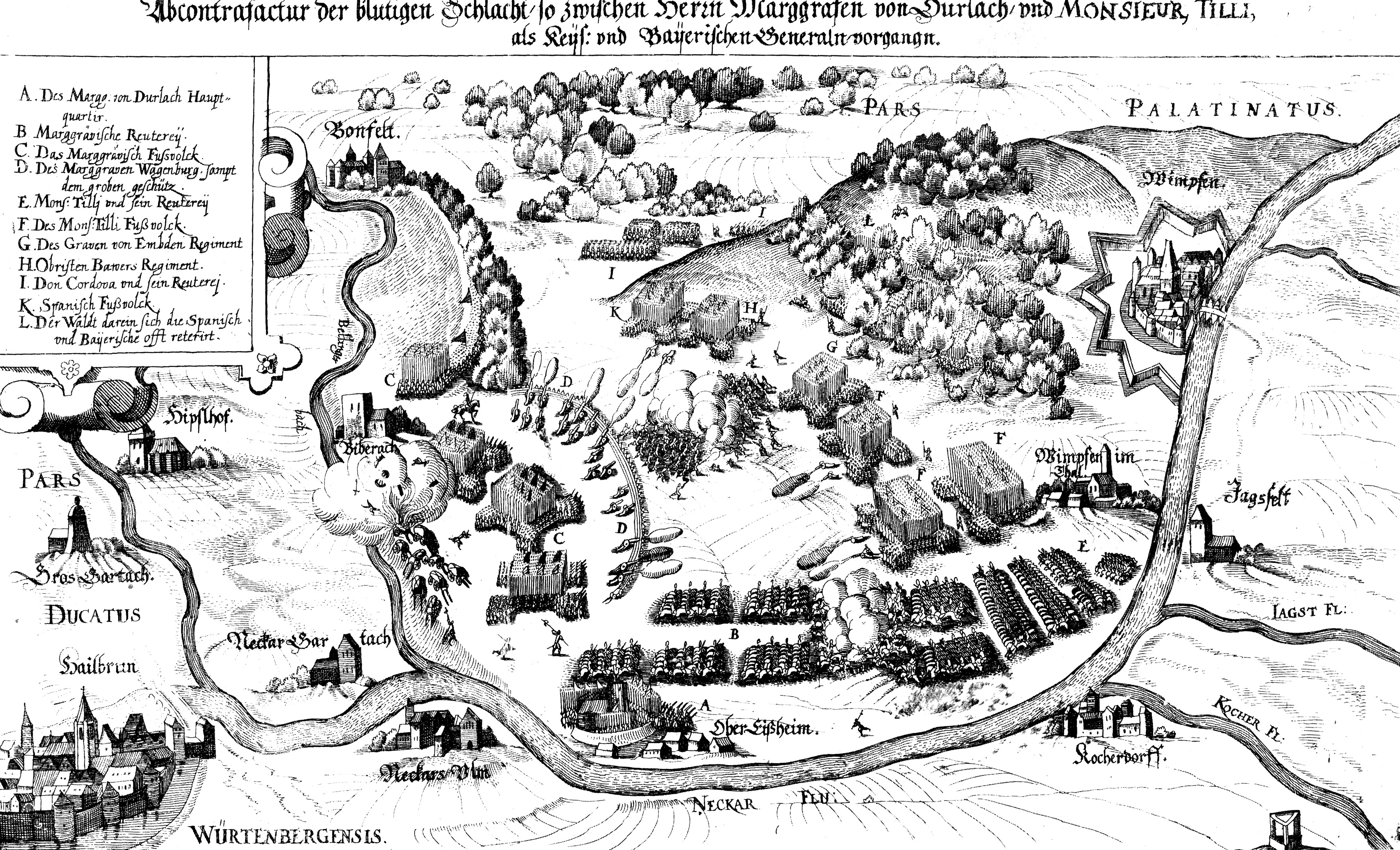
Battlefield views from the north (1635 engraving by Merian) and east (1627 engraving by G. Keller)

On May 6, both sides launched unsuccessful attacks on each other from early morning to about 11 o' clock. Both sides had erected a wagenburg defense, fielded a strong artillery, and were cautious on the attack. Tilly held Córdobas troops in reserve at first, fearing an attack by one of the other Protestant armies in the area that wouldn't come. As the Catholic armies began to break, Tilly's elite regiments held their ground, forming into a tight pike formation and scaring away Georg Friedrich's cavalry regiments.

There was a lull in fighting until early afternoon when a Catholic assault on Georg-Friedrich's right flank sent his cavalry into flight. At about six o'clock an enemy cannon shot caused an explosion in the Protestant powder magazine, spreading panic in their ranks. Shortly afterwards, their wagenburg fell to Catholic attacks. Many died trying to escape across the Böllinger Bach creek.

== Aftermath ==
Count Georg Friedrich was injured in the face and narrowly escaped to Stuttgart, where he abdicated in favour of his eldest son. However, this did not save his family from punishment. His lands were thoroughly devastated by Catholic troops, and in August a substantial part of his domains was awarded to William, Margrave of Baden-Baden of a rival, Catholic branch of House Baden. Until 1771 the margraviate was split into Protestant Baden-Durlach and Catholic Baden-Baden.

General Tilly continued his campaign and prevailed again at the Battle of Höchst in June, then proceeded to subdue the fortified towns of the Electoral Palatinate one by one.

In 1623 the Diet of Regensburg awarded Frederick V's lands and seat in the Electoral College to Duke Maximilian of Bavaria, an eminent leader of the Catholic League. From 1623 he styled himself Maximilian I, Elector of Bavaria and his duchy Electorate of Bavaria.
