= Capture of Oppenheim =

1620 battle of the Thirty Years' War

- Part of the Palatinate phase of the Thirty Years' War
- Engraving of Oppenheim by Matthias Merian
Date	14 September 1620
Location	Oppenheim, Electorate of the Palatinate (present-day Germany)
Result	Spanish victory

Belligerents
Palatinate	Spain

Commanders and leaders
Joachim Ernst	(Spain) Ambrogio Spinola

Strength
24,000 (Joachim Ernst); 1,000 (Oppenheim)	22,000

Casualties and losses
Few dead or wounded 800–1,000 captured	Minor

The Capture of Oppenheim or the Spanish capture of Oppenheim took place on 14 September 1620, at Oppenheim, Electorate of the Palatinate, between the Spanish army commanded by Don Ambrosio Spinola, Marquis of the Balbases, against the forces of the Electoral Palatinate led by Joachim Ernst, Margrave of Brandenburg-Ansbach, during the Palatinate campaign, in the context of the Thirty Years' War. The Spanish troops under Spinola, with a great maneuver of distraction over Worms, deceived the Protestant army of Joachim Ernst, and captured the important town of Oppenheim without too much difficulty, causing a severe blow to the Protestant forces.

== Background ==
In 1620 the Spanish Monarchy entered the Thirty Years' War with the intention of conquering the Electoral Palatinate. The Spanish saw this as necessary because the Palatinate lay on the route from Italy to the Spanish Netherlands (the Spanish Road). Also, Spain was Catholic, so they naturally supported the Holy Roman Emperor against the Protestants in the Thirty Years' War. In August 1620, Don Ambrosio Spinola, as commander-in-chief of the Army of Flanders, invaded the Palatinate from the Spanish Netherlands and advanced over Frankfurt. The rapid relief introduced in this city by the Protestants dissuaded him from attack, and Spinola decided to march to Oppenheim. In early September the towns of Bad Kreuznach and Alsheim were captured by the Spaniards.

The primary objective of Spinola was to occupy a city of some entity that would allow him to secure their supplies and ammunition, thus anticipating the arrival of winter. The attention of the Marquis focused on Oppenheim, a town of strategic importance because their bridge guarded the entrance to the heart of the Electorate of the Palatinate. The town, however, was strongly garrisoned and was protected by strong fortifications, so an immediate assault was seen as an option inadvisable.

== Capture of Oppenheim ==
Spinola raised his camp at Alsheim, and performed a great maneuver of distraction, simulated a march over Worms to distract the forces of the Protestant Union. Joachim Ernst, Margrave of Brandenburg-Ansbach, who commanded the Protestant army stationed in Oppenheim and surroundings, about 24,000 soldiers, took the bait and went with most of his troops to Worms, leaving a small garrison in Oppehneim. Spinola, between therefore, taking advantage of the night approached to Oppenheim, where he arrived with his army at dawn on 14 September, with the assault on the positions of the town not long in coming.

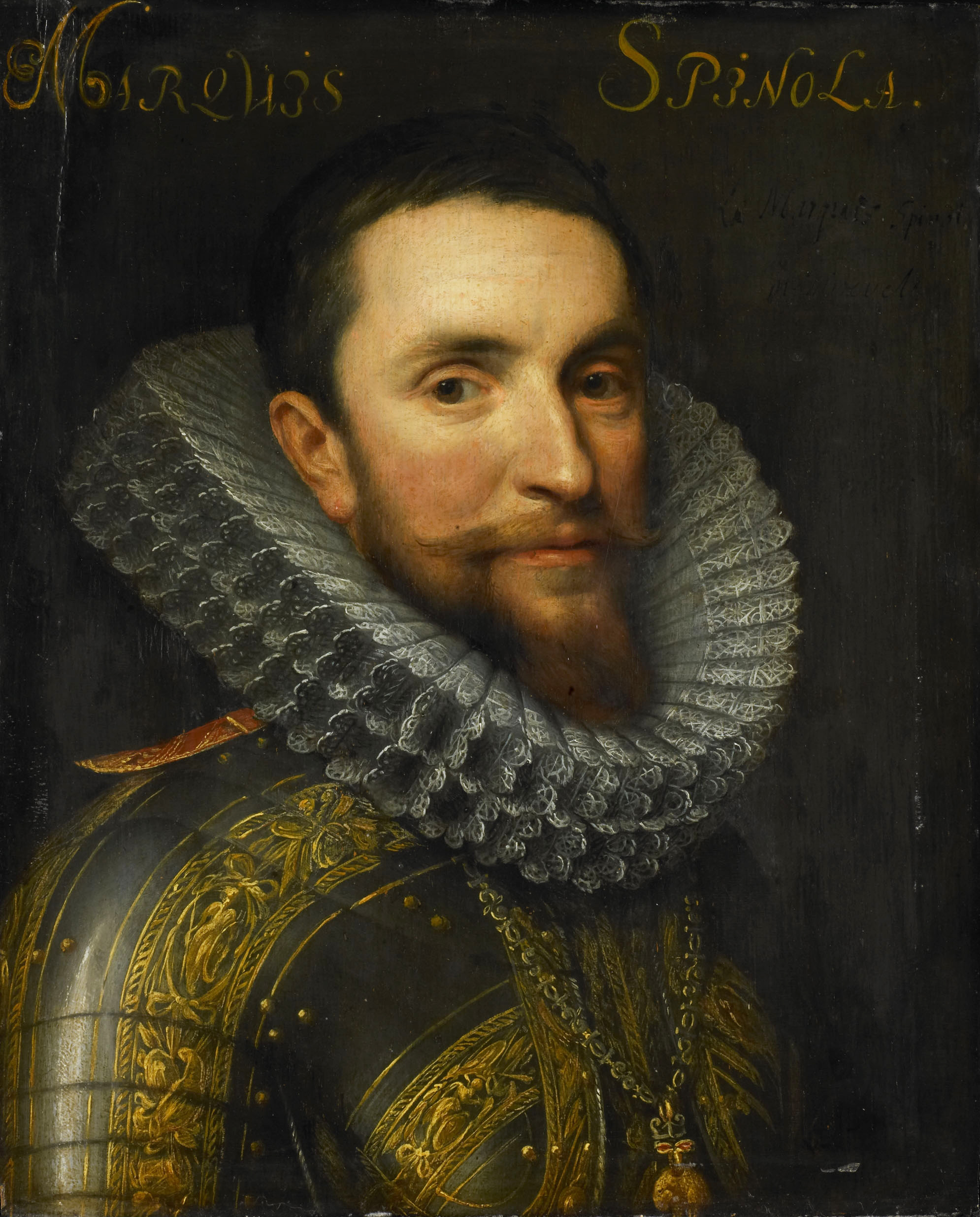
Portrait of Don Ambrosio Spinola by Michiel van Mierevelt.

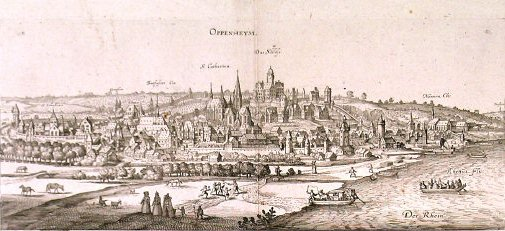
View of Oppenheim by Joannes Janssonius.

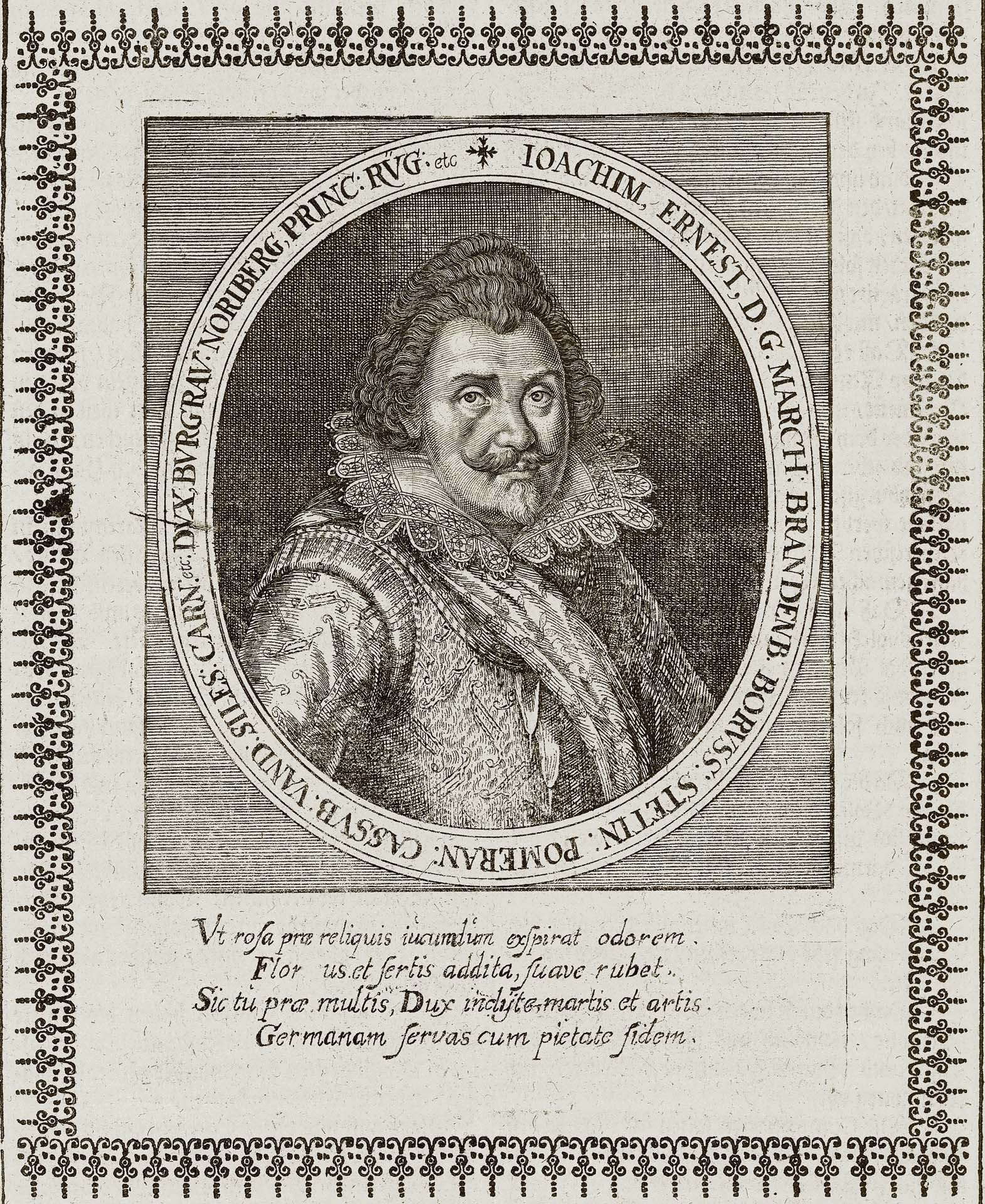
Joachim Ernst of Brandenburg-Ansbach.

The Protestant garrison, seeing such a formidable army, forsook their defenses in a hurry, and soon surrendered without suffering more than a few killed by the assailants. According to the correspondence of Spinola, the Protestant garrison consisted of 800 strong musketeers recruited in the Palatinate. Oppenheim was captured and the Protestant soldiers were disarmed and released. Besides several flags, the Spanish seized the baggage of Protestant soldiers in the barracks of the town.

== Consequences ==
The loss of Oppenheim was a severe blow to the Palatinate, as the town was a key to dominate the shore of the Rhine, because their bridge guarded the entrance to the heart of the Palatinate. The bridge had been destroyed and Spinola ordered it rebuilt. He also sent to reinforce the defenses and established his ammunition dump.

The various garrisons that had been left in the conquered places had driven down the number of the Spanish army, so that Spinola decided to quarter in Oppenheim, and requested reinforcements from Archduke Albert in Brussels. On 25 September, there was a council of the principal officers of the Spanish army, and that day it was learned that the Protestant cavalry were preparing an attack on their barracks. Spinola dispatched to Count Hendrik van den Bergh, in command of 2,200 cavalry, the regiment of the Count of Henden and 3 cannons, to ambush, but the fight did not occur.

At the onset of winter, the two opposing armies withdrew to their garrisons. By then, the Protestants had already received the expected reinforcements from England led by Sir Horace Vere. In the six months following, the Spaniards captured more than 30 towns and castles along the Lower Palatinate.

== See also ==
- Thirty Years' War
- Army of Flanders
