= Anglo-Spanish War (1625–1630) =

War between Spain and England from 1625 to 1630

Anglo-Spanish War of 1625–1630
- Part of the Eighty Years' War
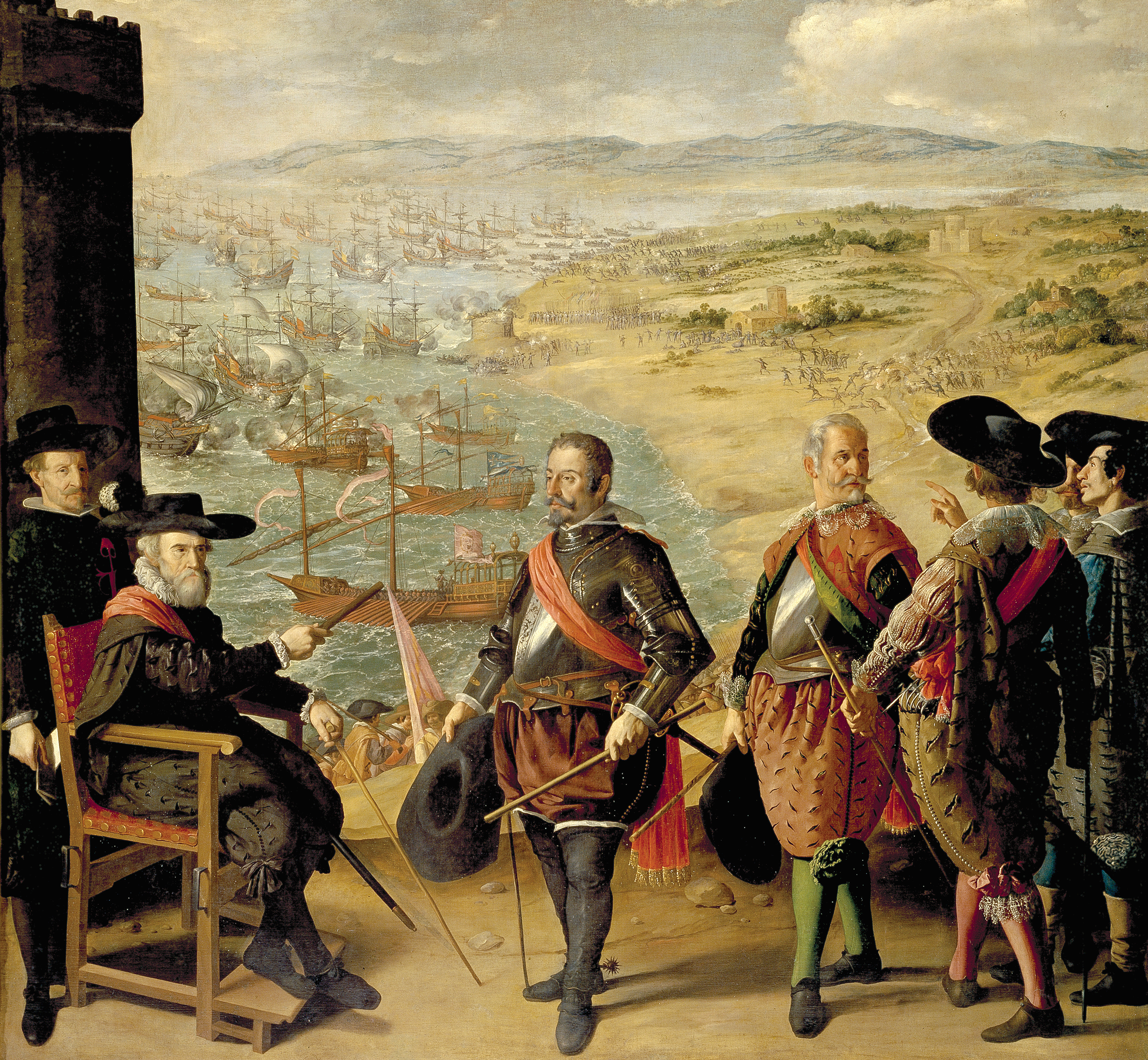
- The Defence of Cádiz against the English by Francisco de Zurbarán
Date	1625–15 November, 1630
Location	Atlantic Ocean, English Channel, Low Countries, Iberian Peninsula and Spanish Main
Result	Spanish Victory. Treaty of Madrid

Belligerents
Spain	England; Dutch Republic; Scotland; Ireland; France (Note: France fought against the Spanish at the Battle of St. Kitts only.)

Commanders and leaders
(Habsburg Spain) Philip IV; (Habsburg Spain) Gaspar Guzmán; (Habsburg Spain) Ambrosio Spinola; (Habsburg Spain) Fadrique Toledo; (Habsburg Spain) Antonio Oquendo; (Habsburg Spain) Juan Guzmán; (Spain) Fernando Girón; Francisco Ribera	(Kingdom of England) (Kingdom of Scotland) Charles I; (Kingdom of England) George Villiers; (Kingdom of England) Edward Cecil; (Kingdom of England) Robert Devereux; (Kingdom of England) Horace Vere; (Kingdom of England) Thomas Warner; (Dutch Republic) Maurice of Nassau; (Dutch Republic) William of Nassau; (Dutch Republic) Peter Ernst

The Anglo-Spanish War of 1625–1630 was fought between Spain and England, with the Dutch Republic and Scotland participating on the English side. An offshoot of the Eighty Years' War between the Dutch and Spanish, the conflict's battles consisted of a mixture of land and naval engagements. The war ended with the signing of the Treaty of Madrid in 1630, resulting in a status quo ante bellum. However, the conflict resulted in English cloth merchants losing access to profitable markets in Flanders, leading to widespread discontent. It also increased divisions between the Parliament of England and the English monarchy, which would ultimately result in the First English Civil War in 1642.

== Background ==
European policy in this period was dominated by the outbreak of the Thirty Years War within the Holy Roman Empire in 1618, and renewal of the Eighty Years' War between Spain and the Dutch Republic in 1622. Despite popular enthusiasm for the Protestant Dutch, and concern at the success of the Catholic Counter-Reformation, English involvement in the Eighty Years' War had been limited to financial support, and provision of volunteer units. This was largely due to differences between the English monarchy and Parliament over the nature of the problem, and how to resolve it.

The Thirty Years War began when the Protestant Frederick V of the Palatinate accepted the Crown of Bohemia, replacing Ferdinand II, Catholic heir to the Holy Roman Emperor. In 1619, Frederick was ousted from Bohemia, while Spanish troops occupied his hereditary lands of the Electoral Palatinate, in preparation for renewing their war with the Dutch. Since Frederick was the son-in-law of James VI and I, king of Scotland and England with his son Charles, Prince of Wales as his heir. At the time, England had military ties with the Dutch Republic and had assisted them in the Eighty Years' War.

== War ==
The 4th Parliament of King James I voted three subsidies and three fifteenths, around £300,000 for the prosecution of the war, with the conditions that it be spent on a naval war. James, ever the pacifist, refused to declare war, and in fact never did. His successor, Charles I, was the one to declare war in 1625.

=== Siege of Breda ===
In August 1624, Spanish commander Ambrosio Spinola ordered his forces to lay siege to the Dutch city of Breda. The city was heavily fortified and defended by a garrison of 7,000 Dutch troops under Justin of Nassau. Spinola rapidly gathered his defences and drove off a Dutch relief army led by Maurice of Nassau, Prince of Orange who was attempting to cut off his supply lines. In February 1625, another relief force, consisting of 7,000 English troops under Sir Horace Vere and Ernst von Mansfeld, was also defeated. Eventually, Justin surrendered Breda to the Spanish in June 1625 after an eleven-month siege.

=== Cádiz expedition ===
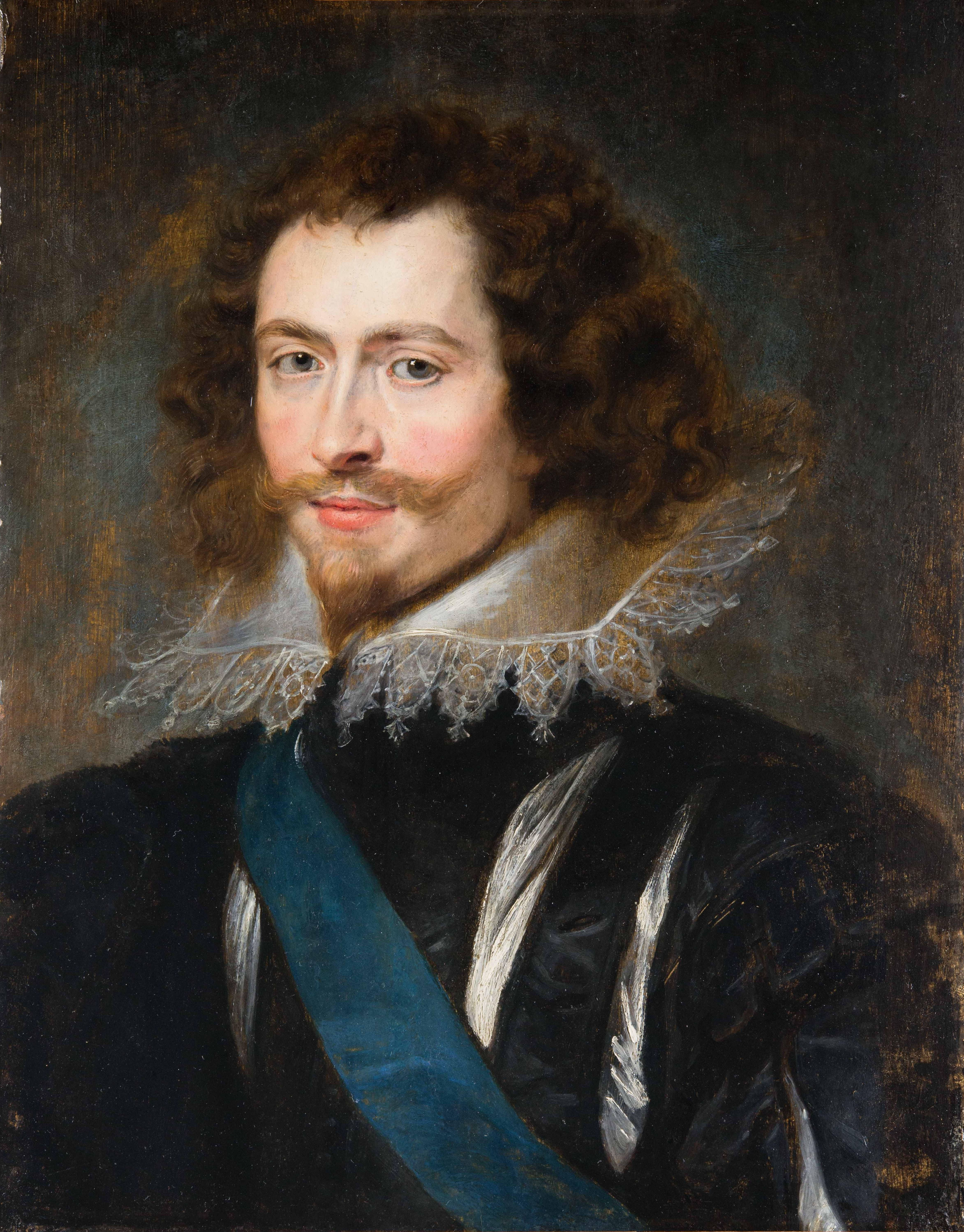
The Duke of Buckingham by Peter Paul Rubens

By October 1625, approximately 100 English ships crewed by 15,000 sailors and soldiers were readied for the Cádiz expedition. An alliance with the Dutch had also been forged, who agreed to dispatch an additional 15 warships commanded by William of Nassau to assist in guarding the English Channel in the absence of the main English fleet. Sir Edward Cecil, a battle-hardened combat veteran in Dutch service, was appointed commander of the expedition by the Duke of Buckingham, a choice that proved to be ill-considered. Cecil was a good soldier, but he had little knowledge of nautical matters.

The planned expedition involved several elements: capturing ships of the Spanish treasure fleet returning from the Americas loaded with valuables, attacking Spanish towns, with the intention of damaging the economy of Spain by weakening their supply chain and consequently relieving Spain's military pressure on the Electorate of the Palatinate. The entire expedition descended into a farce, as English forces wasted time in capturing an old fort of little importance, giving Cádiz the time to fully mobilise behind its defences and allowing Spanish merchantmen in the bay to make good their escape. The city's modernised defences, a vast improvement on those of Tudor times, proved effective. Meanwhile, English troops landed further down the coast to march on the city also became side-tracked because of poor discipline. Eventually, Cecil, the commander of the expedition, faced with dwindling supplies, decided there was no alternative but to return to England, having captured few goods and having had no impact on Spain. And thus in December, a battered fleet returned home.

Charles I, to protect his own dignity and Buckingham, who had failed to ensure the invasion fleet was well supplied, made no effort to inquire as to the cause of the failure of the expedition. Charles turned a blind eye to the debacle, instead preoccupying himself with the plight of the French Huguenots of La Rochelle. But the House of Commons of England proved less forgiving. The 2nd Parliament of Charles I initiated the process of impeachment against the Duke of Buckingham, prompting Charles I to dissolve Parliament rather than risk a successful impeachment.

=== 1627–1628 ===
The Duke of Buckingham then negotiated with France's regent Cardinal Richelieu for English ships to aid Richelieu in his fight against the Huguenots in exchange for French aid against Spanish forces in the Palatinate. Parliament was disgusted and horrified at the thought of English Protestants fighting French Protestants. The plan only fuelled their fears of crypto-Catholicism at court. Buckingham himself, believing that the failure of his enterprise was the result of treachery by Richelieu, formulated an alliance among Cardinal Richelieu's many enemies, a policy that included support for the very Huguenots whom he had recently attacked. English forces commanded by the Duke of Buckingham were defeated by French Royal troops at the siege of Saint-Martin-de-Ré and the siege of La Rochelle. In this campaign the English lost more than 4,000 men of a force of 7,000. On 23 August 1628, while organising a second campaign in Portsmouth, Buckingham was stabbed to death at the Greyhound Pub by John Felton, an army officer who had been wounded at the siege of La Rochelle.

=== Dutch Revolt of 1626–1629 ===
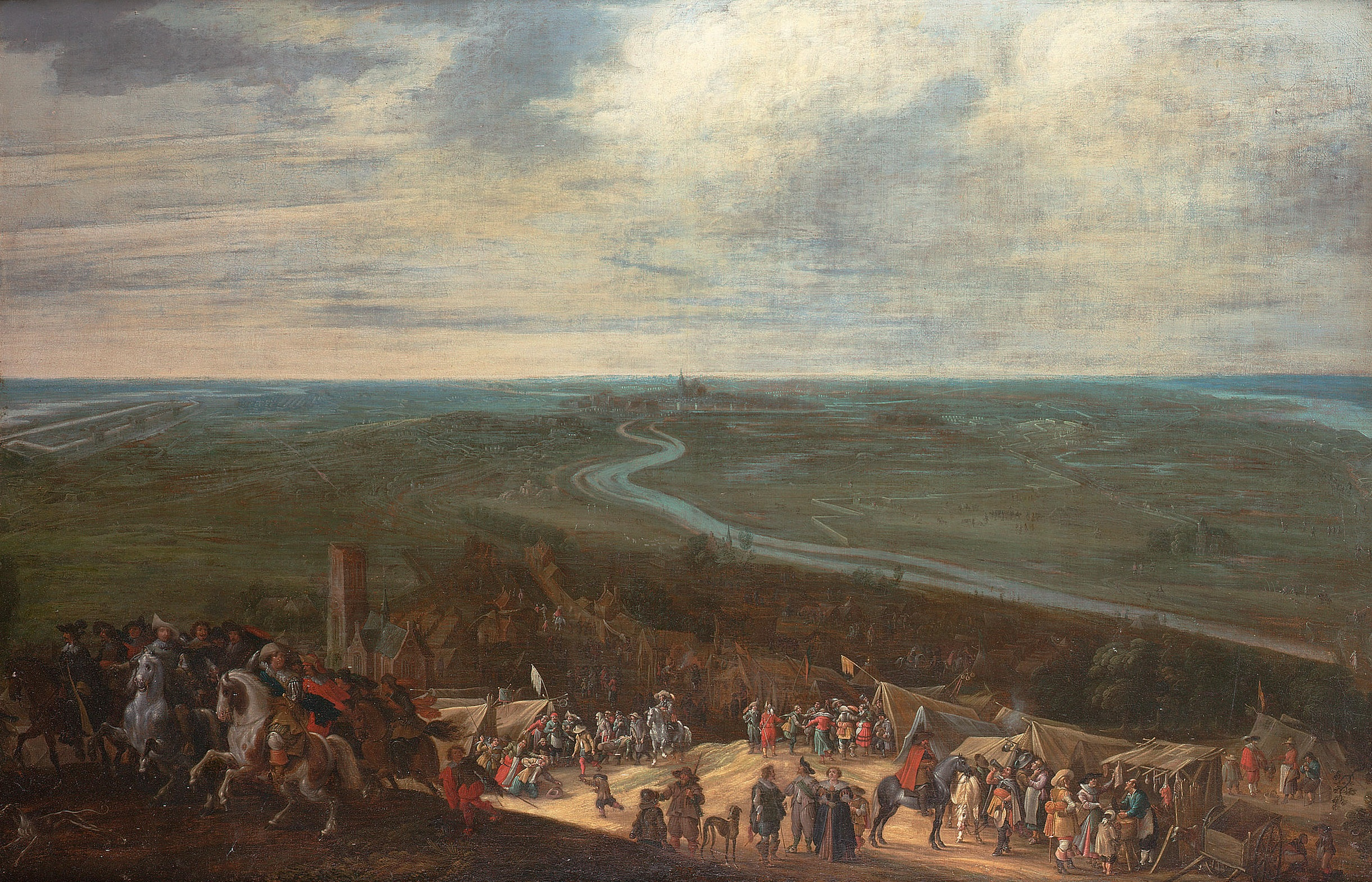
The siege of 's-Hertogenbosch in 1629, by Pieter Snayers

After the surrender of Breda, the Dutch Republic's army still consisted of 61,670 infantrymen and 5,853 cavalrymen, nearly 20,000 of whom were English or Scottish. Among these were four English regiments that Charles I had raised and sent to Holland. A part of this force was sent to the Spanish-held city of Oldenzaal which was captured after a ten-day bombardment in the summer of 1626. The following year the English were under the command of Edward Cecil and contributed to the siege of the city of Groenlo. A Spanish relief force led by Hendrik van den Bergh failed to get through and as a result the city surrendered to Dutch commander Frederick Henry, Prince of Orange. In 1629, the important Spanish stronghold of 's-Hertogenbosch was besieged and captured by Frederick Henry's army of 28,000 men which included a number of English and Scottish regiments commanded by Vere.

=== Saint Kitts and Nevis ===
In 1629, a Spanish naval expedition under Admiral Fadrique de Toledo was sent to liquidate recently established English and French settlements on the Caribbean island of Saint Kitts and Nevis. The territories were regarded by the Spanish Empire as its own since the islands were discovered by the Spanish in 1498 and the English and French settlements had grown sufficiently to be considered a threat to the Spanish West Indies. After arriving at Saint Kitts, the heavily armed settlements on both islands were destroyed and the Spanish seized the islands.

== Aftermath ==
England altered its involvement in the Thirty Years' War by negotiating a Treaty of Suza with France in 1629. Thereafter, expeditions were undertaken by the Duke of Hamilton and Earl of Craven to the Holy Roman Empire in support of the thousands of Scottish and English mercenaries already serving under Gustavus Adolphus of Sweden in that conflict. Hamilton's levy was raised despite the end of the Anglo-Spanish War. In addition English troops would constitute a large part of the Dutch States Army but in Dutch pay after 1630. In the following years, under Frederick Henry and Vere the cities of Maastricht and Rheinberg were recaptured. Breda was recaptured in 1637, with English troops led by Colonel Charles Morgan participating in the siege.

With the advent of the War of the Mantuan Succession Spain sought peace with England in 1629 and so arranged a suspension of arms and an exchange of ambassadors. On 15 November the Treaty of Madrid was signed which ended the war and thus restored the status quo ante bellum. The conflict resulted in English cloth merchants losing access to profitable markets in Flanders, leading to widespread discontent. It also increased divisions between the Parliament of England and the English monarchy, which would ultimately result in the First English Civil War in 1642.

== Sources ==
- Adams, Simon (1983). Spain or the Netherlands? The Dilemmas of Early Stuart Foreign Policy in Before the English Civil War. Springer. ISBN 978-0-333-30899-8.
