= Battle of St. Kitts (1629) =

Spanish capture of St. Kitts in 1629

Coordinates: 17°09′N 62°35′W

- Part of the Anglo-Spanish Wars
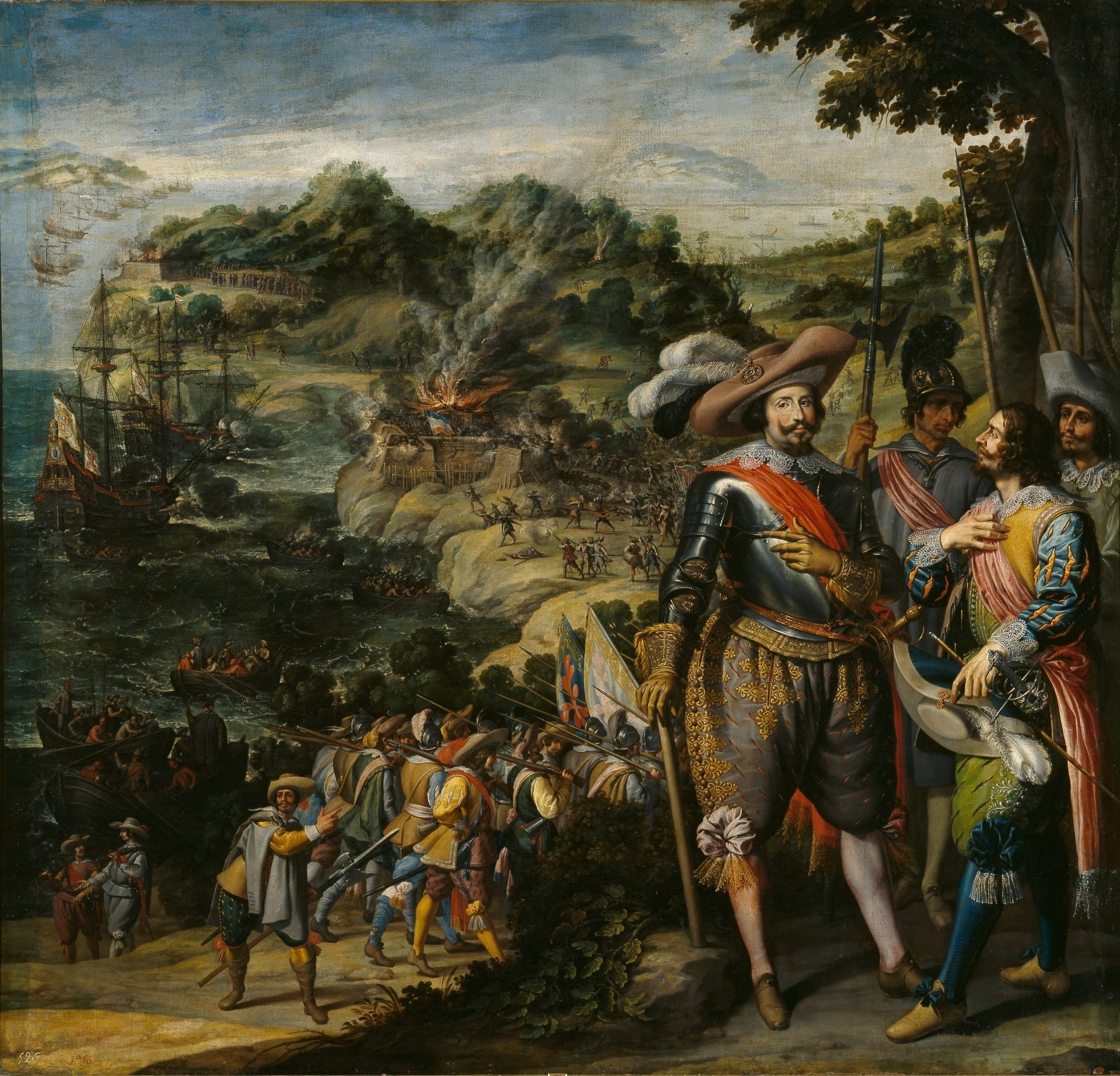
- The Capture of Saint Cristopher (St. Kitts) by Félix Castello; Oil on canvas (1634) El Prado Museum
Date	17 June – 7 September 1629
Location	Saint Kitts and Nevis
Result	Spanish victory
Territorial changes	Spanish capture of Saint Kitts and Nevis

Belligerents
Spain	England; Kingdom of France

Commanders and leaders
(Spain) Fadrique de Toledo (Spain) Antonio de Oquendo	(Kingdom of England) Thomas Warner

Strength
4,000 men 20 galleons	3,000 settlers

Casualties and losses
Unknown	Several ships destroyed 9 ships captured 171 artillery pieces taken 3,100 prisoners

The Battle of St. Kitts or St. Cristopher was a successful Spanish expedition that seized the islands of Saint Kitts and Nevis from the English and French during the Anglo-Spanish War (1625–30).

== Background ==
By the year 1629, the colony had grown sufficiently to be regarded as a threat to the Spanish West Indies. English settlers had been recruited to the number of nearly 3,000, and guns and ammunition had been sent over. Orders were given to the commander of the outward bound Spanish fleet Armada de Sotavento to Mexico to clear out the heavily armed English and French colonies.

== Raid ==
The Spanish expedition, under the command of Admiral Fadrique Álvarez de Toledo Osorio, dropped anchor at Nevis Island and captured and destroyed several English ships anchored there. Spanish soldiers were then sent ashore to destroy the few newly built structures and capture the settlers.

When Nevis was seized by the Spanish forces, the island's plantation owners were deserted by their indentured servants, who swam out to the Spanish ships to cries of "Liberty, joyful Liberty". Many of the indentured servants on the island were Irish Roman Catholics and as such preferred to join forces with the Catholic Spanish than remain with the Protestant plantation owners.

On 7 September 1629, the Spanish expedition moved on to the sister island Saint Kitts and burned the entire settlement.

== Aftermath ==
By the terms of surrender, the Spanish allotted shipping to carry some 700 of the colonists back to England. But other colonists, variously estimated at 200 to 400, evaded capture by taking to the hills and woods. After an agreement between the Spanish and English crowns, the Spanish departed in 1630, handing the island to England. The fugitives returned to their plantations to form the nucleus of a new phase of colonization.
