= List of colonel generals =

The following list of colonel generals denotes those who have held the rank of colonel general in the respective military forces of their countries.

== Mongolia ==
- Sonomyn Luvsangombo, colonel-general of the Mongolian Armed Forces Minister of Social Security of Mongolia (1982–1984)

== England ==
- Sir Arthur Aston, colonel-general of the Yorkshire Trained Bands (1640)
- Sir Thomas Baskerville, colonel-general of land forces accompanying Sir Francis Drake's expedition to the West Indies (1595–1596); colonel-general of English forces in Picardy (1596–1597)
- John Berkeley, 1st Baron Berkeley of Stratton, Royalist colonel-general of Devon and Cornwall (1645–1646)
- Richard Bonython, colonel-general of the Saco Militia (1645–?)
- Sir Nicholas Byron, Royalist colonel-general of Cheshire (1643–1644)
- Charles Cavendish, Royalist colonel-general of Lincolnshire (1642–1643)
- Thomas Cecil, 1st Earl of Exeter, colonel-general of the London Foot (1601)
- Sir John Corbet, Parliamentarian colonel-general of Shropshire (1642)
- Robert Devereux, 2nd Earl of Essex, colonel-general of the English Horse in the Netherlands (1586–1587)
- John Frescheville, 1st Baron Frescheville of Staveley, Royalist Colonel-General of Derbyshire (1644–1645)
- Sir Thomas Glemham, Royalist colonel-general of Northumberland (1643–1646)
- Henry Hastings, 1st Baron Loughborough, Royalist colonel-general of the East Midlands (1643)
- Bussy Mansell, Royalist colonel-general of Wales (1645)
- Sir Charles Morgan, colonel-general of His Majesty's Forces in the service of the King of Denmark
- Sir John Norris, colonel-general of the Dutch Army in Friesland (1580–1583); colonel-general of the English Army in the Netherlands (1585–1586); colonel-general of the English Foot in the Netherlands (1586–1587)
- Sydenham Poyntz, Parliamentarian colonel-general of the Northern Association (1645–1647)
- Robert Radcliffe, 5th Earl of Sussex, colonel-general of Foot (1599)
- Colonel-General Ruthin, Parliamentarian Governor of Plymouth
- Sir Thomas Scott, colonel-general of Kent, Spanish Armada campaign (1588)
- Sir William Vavasour, Royalist colonel-general of the Welsh Marches (1643–1644)
- Sir Francis Vere, colonel-general of English Foot in the Netherlands (?–1604)
- Sir Richard Willys, Royalist colonel-general of Nottinghamshire, Lincolnshire and Rutland (1645)
