= The Defence of Cádiz Against the English =

1634 painting by Francisco de Zurbarán

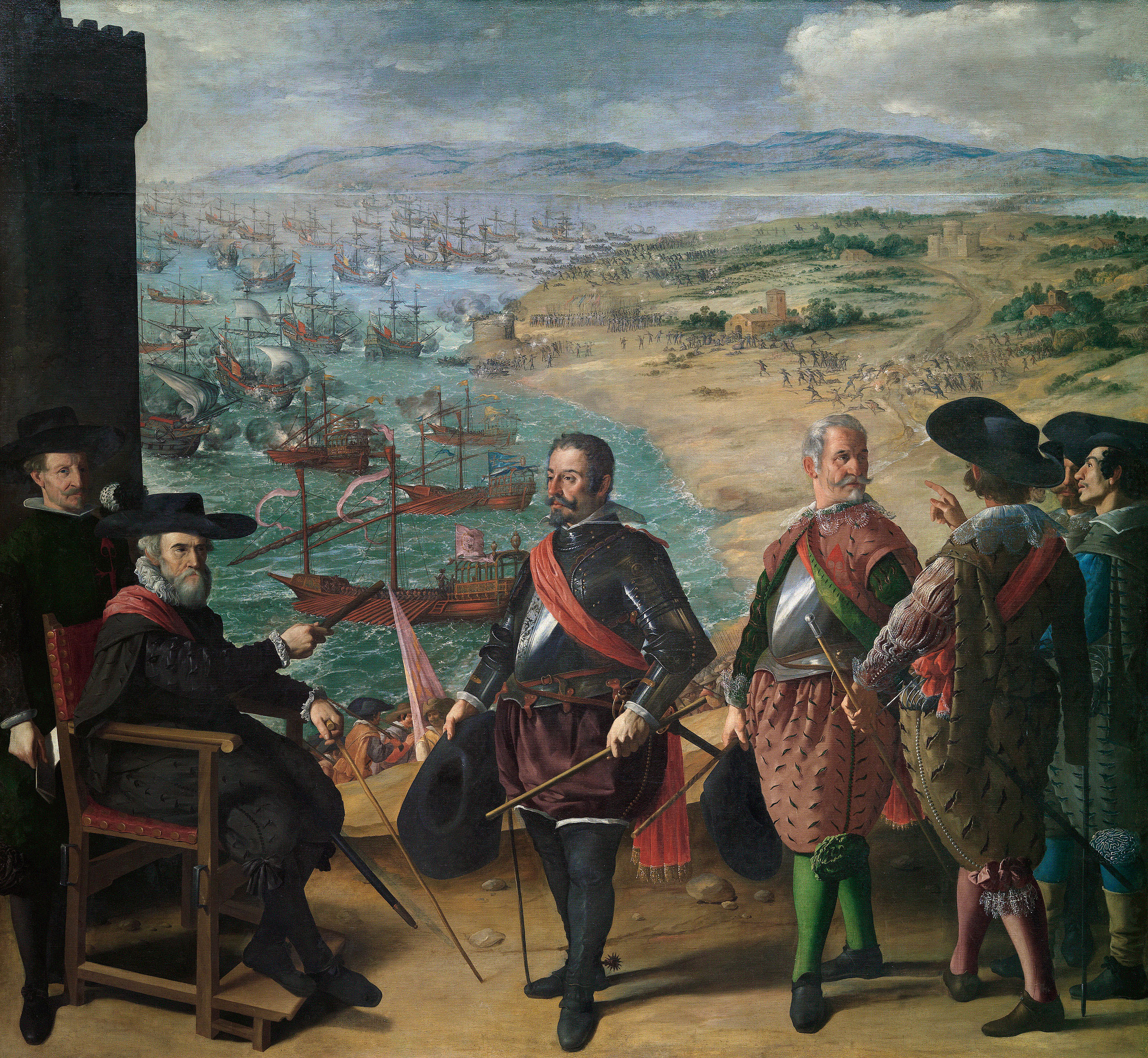
- Artist: Francisco de Zurbarán
- Year: 1634
- Medium: Oil on canvas
- Dimensions: 302 cm × 323 cm (119 in × 127 in)
- Location: Museo del Prado, Madrid

The Defence of Cádiz (full title: The Defence of Cádiz Against the English or The Hostile Landing of the English near Cádiz in 1625 Under the Command of the Earl of Leicester (Note: In Spanish, the Conde de Lest. However, the Earl of Leicester was then Robert Sidney, who took no part in the landings, meaning this is a mistake, possibly for Robert Devereux, 3rd Earl of Essex, a vice-admiral and foot colonel on the expedition.)) is a painting in oils on canvas by Francisco de Zurbarán, now in the Museo del Prado in Madrid.

It shows the Spanish preparing their defences just before the arrival of Edward Cecil's Cádiz expedition of 1625. In the left foreground is the city's governor Fernando Girón giving orders to his subordinates, including the deputy field commander Diego Ruiz. In the background are the English troops landing in front of the El Puntal fort in the Bay of Cádiz.

Initially attributed to Eugenio Caxés, it is now known to have been painted by Zurbarán as part of a decorative scheme for the Hall of Realms at the Buen Retiro Palace in Madrid which also included Velázquez's The Surrender of Breda and Maino's The Recovery of Bahía de Todos los Santos. Zurbarán also produced ten paintings of the Labours of Hercules for the Hall of Realms; these are also now in the Prado.
