= Colonel general =

Military rank

Colonel general is a military rank used in some armies. It is particularly associated with Germany, where historically general officer ranks were one grade lower than in the Commonwealth and the United States, and Generaloberst was a rank above full General, but below Generalfeldmarschall. The rank of colonel general is also used in the armed forces organized along the lines of the Soviet model, where it is comparable to that of a lieutenant general.

== Austria-Hungary ==
In the Austro-Hungarian Army, the second-highest rank was colonel general (German: Generaloberst, Hungarian: vezérezredes). The rank was introduced in 1915, following the German model. The rank was not used after World War I in the Austrian Army of the Republic.

Insignia of an Austro-Hungarian Army colonel general

=== Hungary ===
The rank of vezérezredes (lit. 'Chief regimental commander') is still used in Hungary. The rank replaced the ranks of gyalogsági tábornok (general of infantry), lovassági tábornok (general of cavalry), and táborszernagy (general of artillery) in the early 1940s.

Since 1991, vezérezredes has been the highest rank in the Hungarian Defence Forces, and is officially translated as General.

Royal Hungarian Army colonel general rank insignia

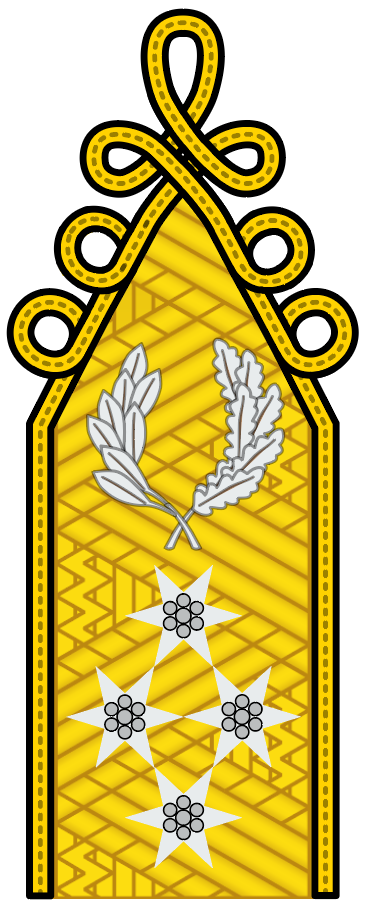
Hungarian Defence Forces colonel general rank insignia

== Czechoslovakia ==
The rank of colonel general (generálplukovník) was created in the Czechoslovak army in 1950, and dropped after the 1993 dissolution of the state.

== France ==
In the French Army, under the Ancien régime, the officer in nominal command of all the regiments of a particular branch of service (i. e. infantry, cavalry, dragoons, Swiss troops, etc.) was known as the colonel general. This was not a rank, but an office of the Crown.

== Georgia ==
The Republic of Georgia adopted Soviet designations after its independence in 1991. The rank of colonel-general (Georgian: გენერალ-პოლკოვნიკი, general-polkovniki) is the highest rank in the Patrol Police and Border Police of the Ministry of Internal Affairs. In the Defence Forces it is the highest general officer rank. The Chief of Defence Forces is typically a major general.

== Germany ==
The rank of Generaloberst was introduced in the Prussian Army in 1854, originally as Colonel General with the rank of Field Marshal (Generaloberst in dem Rang als Generalfeldmarschall) as field marshal was a wartime promotion and excluded members of the royal family. It later was split into said two ranks and eventually was adopted by the other state forces of the German Empire.

It was also used in the Reichswehr of the Weimar Republic, and more prominently within the Wehrmacht. The rank continued in the National People's Army of East Germany until German reunification in 1990. The Bundeswehr, first in West Germany and since 1990 in unified Germany, does not use it and has General as highest rank.

Generaloberst
(German Army)

Generaloberst mit dem Rang als Generalfeldmarschall
(Imperial German Army)

== Mongolia ==
In 1961, J. Lkhagvasuren was awarded the title of Colonel General of the People's Republic of Mongolia. There are 9 people in Mongolia who have been promoted to colonel general. Sonomyn Luvsangombo was the last living person to hold the title upon his death in 2026. Since 2006, this rank has been removed from the ranks of the Mongolian Armed Forces.

== North Korea ==
Rank insignia colonel general of North Korea

Army

Air Force

The North Korean rank of sangjang translates as "colonel general". A sangjang is senior to a jungjang (usually translated as "lieutenant general") and junior to a daejang (usually translated as "general").

This rank is typically held by the commanding officer of units along the Korean DMZ and the North Korean security zone at Panmunjom. It is the rank held by the KPA Pyongyang Defense Command's commanding general.

== Russia ==
Rank insignias colonel general of Russia

Army

Air Force

The rank of colonel general (Russian: генерал-полковник, romanized: general-polkovnik) was first established in the Red Army on 7 May 1940, as a replacement for the previously existing Komandarm 2nd rank (kommandarm vtorovo ranga, "army commander of the second rank"). During World War II, about 199 officers were promoted to colonel general. Before 1943, Soviet colonel generals wore four stars on their collar patches (petlitsy). Since 1943, they have worn three stars on their shoulder straps—in most armed forces three stars usually identify the second- or third-highest general or flag officer, as for a United States lieutenant general. Unlike the German Generaloberst (which it most probably calqued), the Soviet and Russian colonel general rank is not exceptional or rare, but a normal step in the progression from two-star lieutenant general to four-star army general.

Other than that, the Soviet and Russian rank systems sometimes cause confusion in regard to equivalence of ranks, because the normal Western title for brigadier or brigadier general ceased to exist for the Russian Army in 1798. The kombrig rank that corresponded to one-star general only existed in the Soviet Union from 1935– to 1940. Positions typically reserved for these ranks, such as brigade commanders, have always been occupied by colonels (polkovnik) or, very rarely, major generals (see History of Russian military ranks).

The rank has usually been given to district, front and army commanders, and also to deputy ministers of defense, deputy heads of the general staff and so on.

In some post-Soviet Commonwealth of Independent States armies (for example in Belarus), there are no generals of the army or marshals; colonel general is the highest rank, usually held by the minister of defense.

The corresponding naval rank is admiral, which is also denoted by three stars.

== Sweden ==
Colonel general (generalöverste) has also been a senior military rank in Sweden, used principally before the 19th century.

== Ukraine ==
In Ukraine, colonel general (Ukrainian: генерал-полковник, romanized: heneral-polkovnyk) is now an obsolete military rank of general officers of the Ground Forces, Air Force, and Navy (only Marine Corps, Naval Aviation and Shore Establishment). It was first introduced in 1920 as part of a rank system in Ukrainian People's Army replacing such terms as Sotnyk general and Bunchuk general.

From October 1, 2020, the rank of colonel general in Ukraine was no longer assigned and the highest rank of general was introduced. Until 2020, it was a higher rank than a lieutenant general, but a lower rank than general of the Army of Ukraine.

Although the rank of colonel general has not been awarded since 2020, it remains with its current bearers until they receive the military rank of general. Despite the fact that the military rank of colonel general was withdrawn from circulation, after the next version of the order, the insignia of this rank were indicated. A colonel general has shoulder straps with four four-rayed stars above the maces. To distinguish the holders of the rank of colonel general from the holders of the newly introduced rank of general (have the same number of stars on the shoulder straps), it was decided to apply different schemes of star placement. The stars on the shoulder straps of the generals are located along the axis of the shoulder strap, and the stars of the colonel generals are arranged in a diamond.

Equivalent to the ranks of colonel general and general in the navy is the rank of admiral. Until 2020, the ranks of colonel general and admiral were denoted by three stars. Since 2020, the ranks of general, colonel general and admiral have become four-star ranks (with existing colonel generals slotted below generals of the Armed Forces).

Insignia of the rank of colonel general, Ukraine:

until 2016	project 2016	2016–2020	from 2020

== United Kingdom ==
The title of colonel general was used before and during the English Civil War in both Royalist and Parliamentarian armies. In these cases, it often appears to have meant a senior colonel as opposed to a senior general.

== Colonel generals' insignia ==
գեներալ-գնդապետ
General-gndapet
(Armenian Ground Forces)

General-polkovnik
(Azerbaijani Land Forces)

Ґенэрал-палкоўнік
G̀jeneral-palkoŭnik
(Belarusian Ground Forces)

General pukovnik
(Bosnian Ground Forces)

General pukovnik
(Croatian Army)

Генерал-Полҝвниҝ
General-polkovnïk
(Kazakh Ground Forces)

General pukovnik
(Montenegrin Ground Army)

Генера́л-полко́вник
Generál-polkóvnik
(Russian Ground Forces)

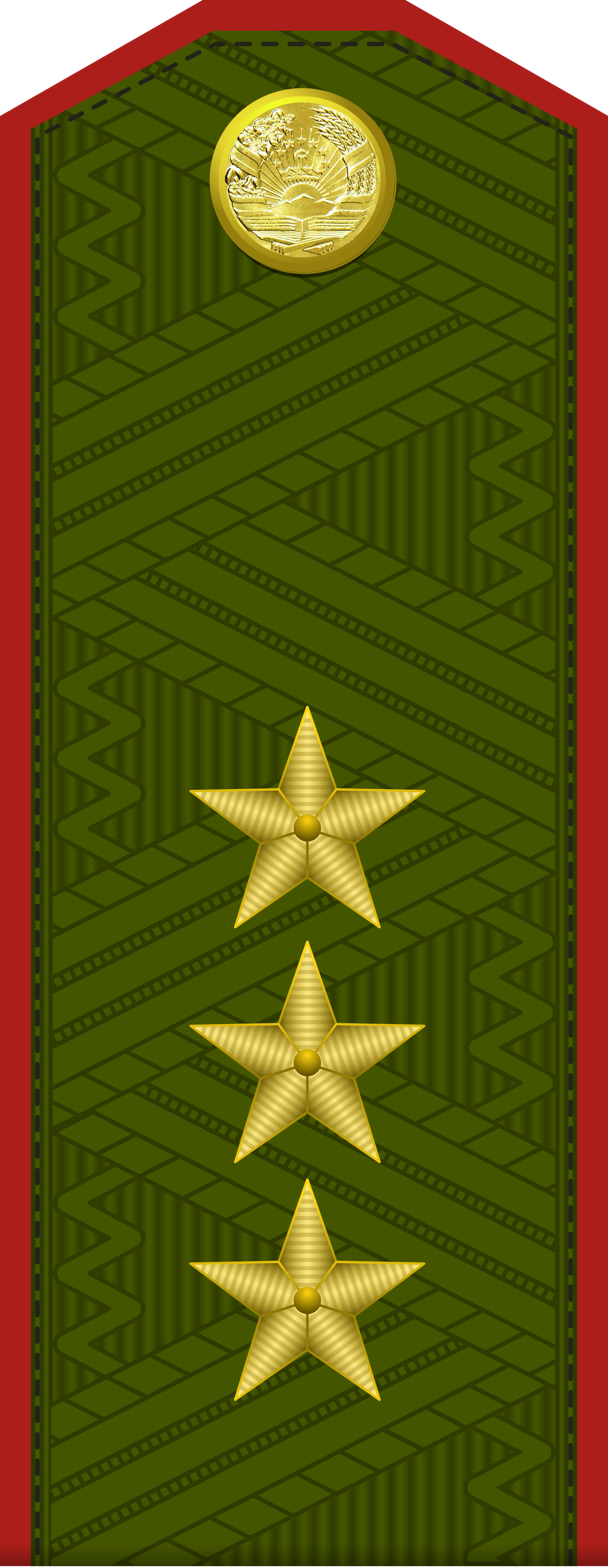
Генерал-полковник
General-polkovnik
(Tajik National Army)

General-polkownik
(Turkmen Ground Forces)

General-polkovnik
(Uzbek Ground Forces)

== See also ==
- Lieutenant colonel general
- List of colonel generals
