= Siege of Breda (1637) =

Siege in 1637, part of the Eighty Years' War

- Part of the Eighty Years' War, Thirty Years' War and Franco-Spanish War (1635–1659)
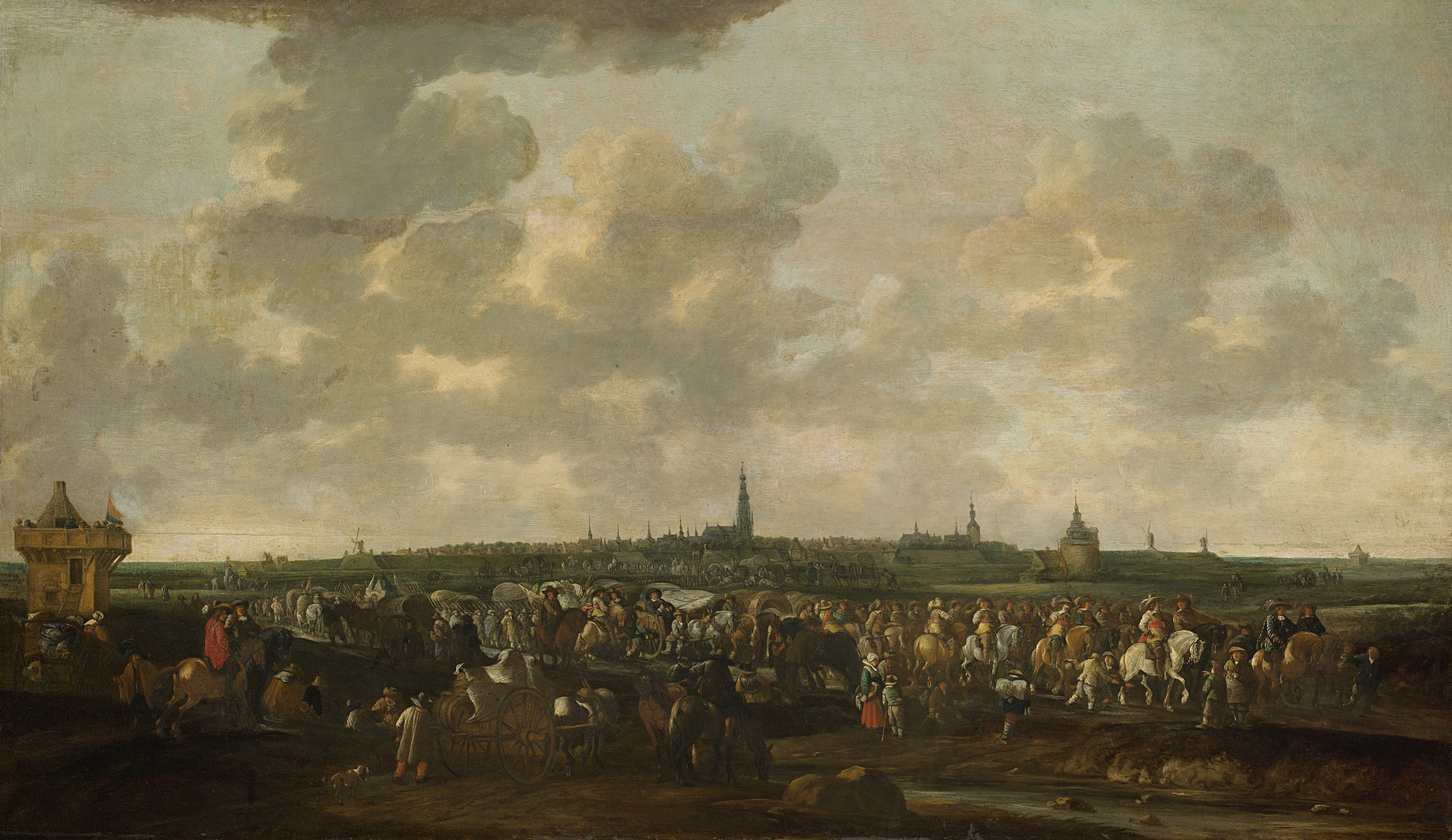
- The Spanish army leaving Breda
Date	21 July 1637 – 11 October 1637
Location	Breda (present-day the Netherlands) 51°34′N 4°48′E
Result	Dutch victory

Belligerents
Dutch Republic	Spain

Commanders and leaders
(Dutch Republic) Frederick Henry (Dutch Republic) Henry Casimir	(Spain) Gomar de Fourdin

Strength
18,000	2,000

Casualties and losses
850 dead 1,300 wounded	Unknown

The fourth siege of Breda (21 July – 11 October 1637) was an important siege in the Eighty Years' War in which stadtholder Frederick Henry, Prince of Orange retook the city of Breda, which had last changed hands in 1625 when the Spanish general Ambrogio Spinola conquered it for the Spanish Habsburgs. Hereafter, the city would remain in the hands of the Dutch Republic until the end of the war.

== Background ==
In 1635 France and the Dutch Republic formed an alliance against Spain with the objective of conquering and partitioning the Spanish Netherlands. They invaded on two fronts in June 1635, but soon the Spanish forces regained the initiative against the combined Franco-Dutch army, which was ignominiously driven to the Dutch border. There Spain managed to capture the strategic fortress of Schenkenschans by surprise. This forced the Dutch to enter upon a long and costly siege of that fortress that occupied the Dutch army for nine months.

After the recapture of Schenkenschans in April 1636, the Spanish commander, the Cardinal-Infante Ferdinand of Spain, shifted his focus to France. This required that the Army of Flanders move away from the Dutch border; therefore the military threat Spain posed to the Dutch Republic lessened. In the summer of 1636 the Cardinal-Infante reached as far as Corbie during the Crossing of the Somme, but this city was retaken by the French in November, and at the end of the year Spain had lost most of its gains. For the campaign of 1637 Olivares planned a renewed offensive against France. In Brussels the Cardinal-Infante actually would have preferred an offensive against the Dutch, but reluctantly agreed to take part in the three-pronged invasion of France that summer (the other invasions would come from Catalonia and Lombardy). He therefore started to mass his forces on the French border when word came that the Dutch had suddenly invested the city of Breda with a besieging army of 18,000.

Breda was the capital city of the baronial fief that had once been the crown jewel in the Dutch estates of the Nassau family in the Habsburg Netherlands before the war started. Frederick Henry had therefore a personal interest in recapturing the city and its surroundings.

== Siege ==
On 21 July 1637, the siege was preceded by an attempt to surprise the garrison by Dutch cavalry under Henry Casimir I of Nassau-Dietz. However, the gates were closed in time and the Dutch skirmishers were driven back. Three days later the Dutch then captured a number of villages around the city. Ten companies of English troops which were led by veteran Colonel Charles Morgan captured Ginneken. Frederick Henry set up his headquarters here and the besiegers started to dig a double line of circumvallation that would eventually reach a circumference of 34 km (21 mi). An outer contravallation (8 ft. deep and 16 ft. wide) defended the besiegers from outside interference, and outside this area the low-lying countryside was inundated by damming a few rivers.

Unlike the strategy adopted by Ambrosio Spinola at Breda in 1624–25, Frederick Henry did not plan on a passive siege, aimed at starving the fortress, but intended a more aggressive approach. The Spanish attempted a relief led by the Cardinal-Infante but were driven back and chased by 22 companies including four English companies led by Sir Simon Harcourt. He therefore lifted his siege of the besiegers and moved with his army to the valley of the Meuse, where he took Roermond and Venlo from the Dutch, a considerable loss.

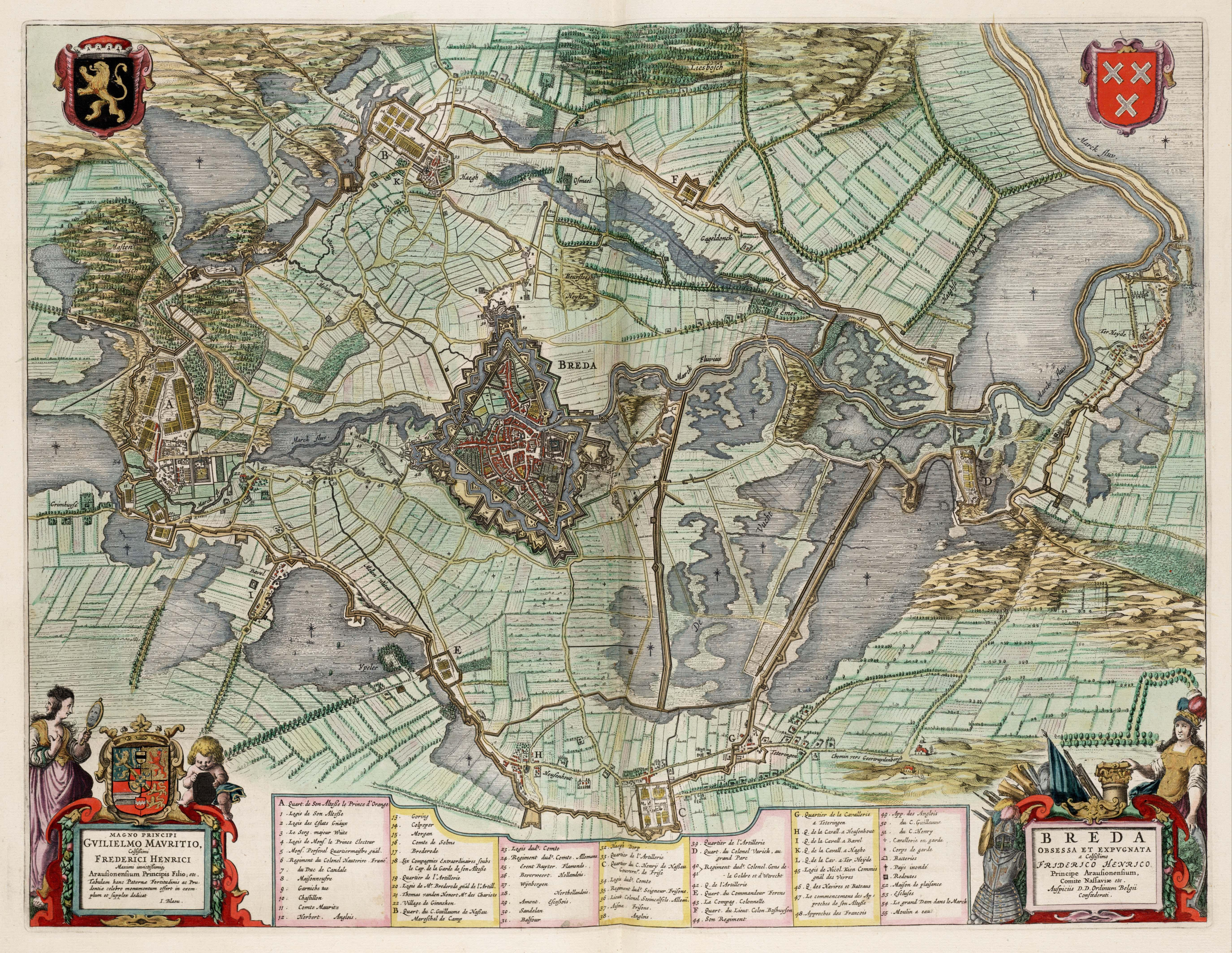
Map of the siege of Breda by Johannes Blaeu

Undistracted, the besiegers meanwhile started digging covered trenches inward from the circumvallation line toward the hornworks of the fortress, which had been constructed by the Dutch themselves on the model of a star fort. Two of these trenches were dug toward the Ginnekenpoort (Ginneken Gate), one by French, the other by English mercenaries. The French finished their work on 27 August, the English one day later. Fascines were used to fill the moat. The French and English scaled the walls of the hornwork on 1 September. That same night, the French ambassador Girard de Charnacé, who commanded a French regiment of the besiegers, was adventitiously killed by a bullet to the head.

The besiegers then started mining the hornwork, and on 7 September the mine was blown, breaching the walls. George Monk, later first Duke of Albemarle, then a captain in Dutch service, was first in the breach. With him was George Goring who was wounded in the attack, which saw the hornwork taken. However, a few days later a different mine misfired, and another attack was repelled with great loss of life among the Dutch and Scottish attackers. Nevertheless, the defenders now abandoned this part of the outer defense works to the besiegers.

On 2 October, count Henry of Nassau managed to take a lunette and ravelin and drive the defenders into the city proper. This meant that the inner city was now open to attack by mines. The garrison knew that the situation was hopeless. Honor having been preserved, the governor, Gomar de Fourdin sued for an honorable surrender on 6 October. The capitulation was signed, and on 11 October the Habsburg garrison left the city with flags flying and drums rolling. They marched off toward Mechelen.

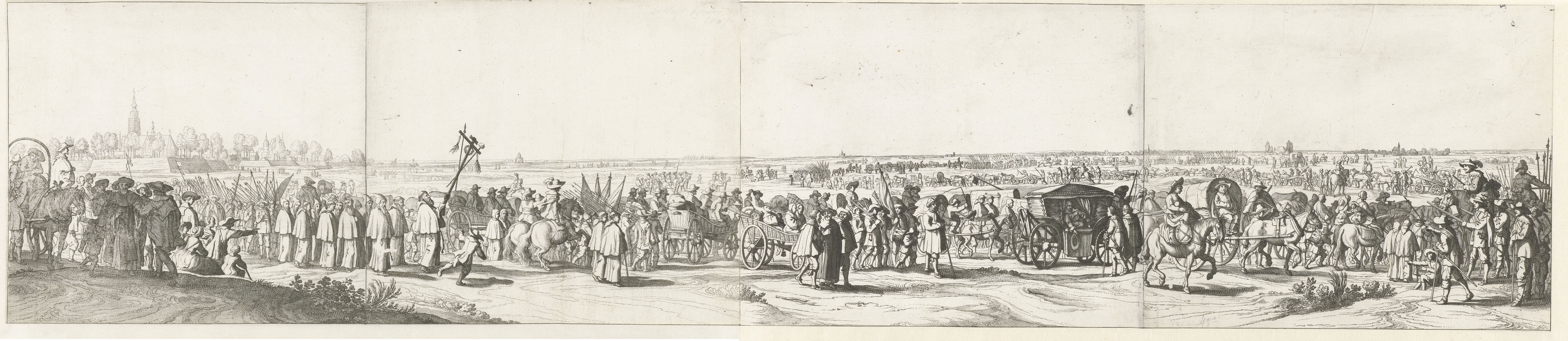
Exodus of the Spanish garrison from Breda, 1637. Print by Pieter Nolpe

== Aftermath ==
The capture of Breda secured the territory of the Dutch against Spanish incursions and also secured the navigation of the Waal, Meuse and the mouths of the Scheldt.

Though Spain almost managed to capture the important fortress of Rheinberg from the Dutch a month after the fall of Breda, the campaign season of 1637 was now over. The next year the Army of Flanders was kept on the defensive by attacks from both France and the Republic. Frederick Henry made an attempt to capture Antwerp, but his advance guard was caught in the open by a crack Spanish force on 20 June 1638 and defeated in the only pitched battle of the second part of the Eighty Years' War at Kallo.

== Sources ==
- (in Dutch) Arend, J.P., Rees, O. van, Brill, W.G., Vloten, J. van (1868) Algemeene geschiedenis des vaderlands: van de vroegste tijden tot op heden. Deel 3.
- Israel, J.I. (1997), "Olivares, the Cardinal-Infante and Spain's Strategy in the Low Countries: The Road to Rocroi, 1635-43," in: Conflicts of Empires. Spain, the Low Countries and the struggle for world supremacy 1585-1713. Hambledon Press, ISBN 1-85285-161-9, pp. 63–91
- Marks, Adam (2022). England and the Thirty Years' War ·. Brill. ISBN 9789004522695.
