= Treaty of Madrid (1630) =

Peace agreement between Spain and England

The Treaty of Madrid of 1630 was a peace agreement through which Spain and England ended the Anglo-Spanish War (1625–1630) that both countries had been engaged in since 1625. The treaty included the reestablishment of trade relations between the two countries.

== The treaty ==
=== Delegations ===
After preliminary talks had been held since at least 1629 by informal agents (including Peter Paul Rubens and Balthazar Gerbier), and by the mediation of Charles Emmanuel I, Duke of Savoy and the offices of Carlos Coloma, Spanish Ambassador in London, the final treaty was signed on 15 November 1630 in Madrid, in the presence of Gaspar de Guzmán, Count-Duke of Olivares, Íñigo Vélez de Guevara, 8th Count of Oñate and Pedro de Zúñiga y de la Cueva on behalf of King Philip IV of Spain and of Francis Cottington sent by King Charles I of England.

=== Agreements ===
The main points agreed upon in the treaty were:

- Cessation of hostilities; all damages and offenses shall be forgotten; revocation of letters of marque granted during the war.
- Denial of aid and trade with the enemies of the opposing party; none of the signatories will form alliances to the detriment of the other party.
- Restoration of commercial relations according to the terms agreed in the Treaty of London of 1604.
- Spanish ships will have free entry into English ports, and reciprocally, the English ships can enter Spanish ports.
- The subjects of each of the signatory countries will receive the same treatment in the other country as the natives.
- England will interrupt its commercial relations with the Dutch Republic, still at war with Spain in Flanders.
- Merchandise from England, Scotland and Ireland will have free entry into Spain, upon payment of the applicable fees; the same treatment will be received by Spanish merchandise in the British Isles. Merchandise purchased by Englishmen in Spain and destined for third countries will have a surcharge of 30%.
- English citizens will not be harassed by the Spanish Inquisition for reasons of religion.
- Suppression of the right of Aubana.
- In the event of a new war between the two countries, citizens residing in foreign territory will have six months to leave the country, taking their property with them.
- Release of the prisoners taken by both parties during the course of the war, after payment of the expenses caused by their presence; galley slaves will be exempt from this payment.
- Intermediation of England before a hypothetical truce with the Dutch Republic.
- The commercial conditions agreed with Spain will be equally applicable in the Spanish Netherlands. The conditions of the treaty include the allies of both countries.

== Sources ==
- English version of the treaty.
- British History Online
- The role of Rubens in preparing the treaty
