= Fernando Girón de Salcedo =

Don Fernando Girón de Salcedo y Briviesca Primer Marqués de Sofraga
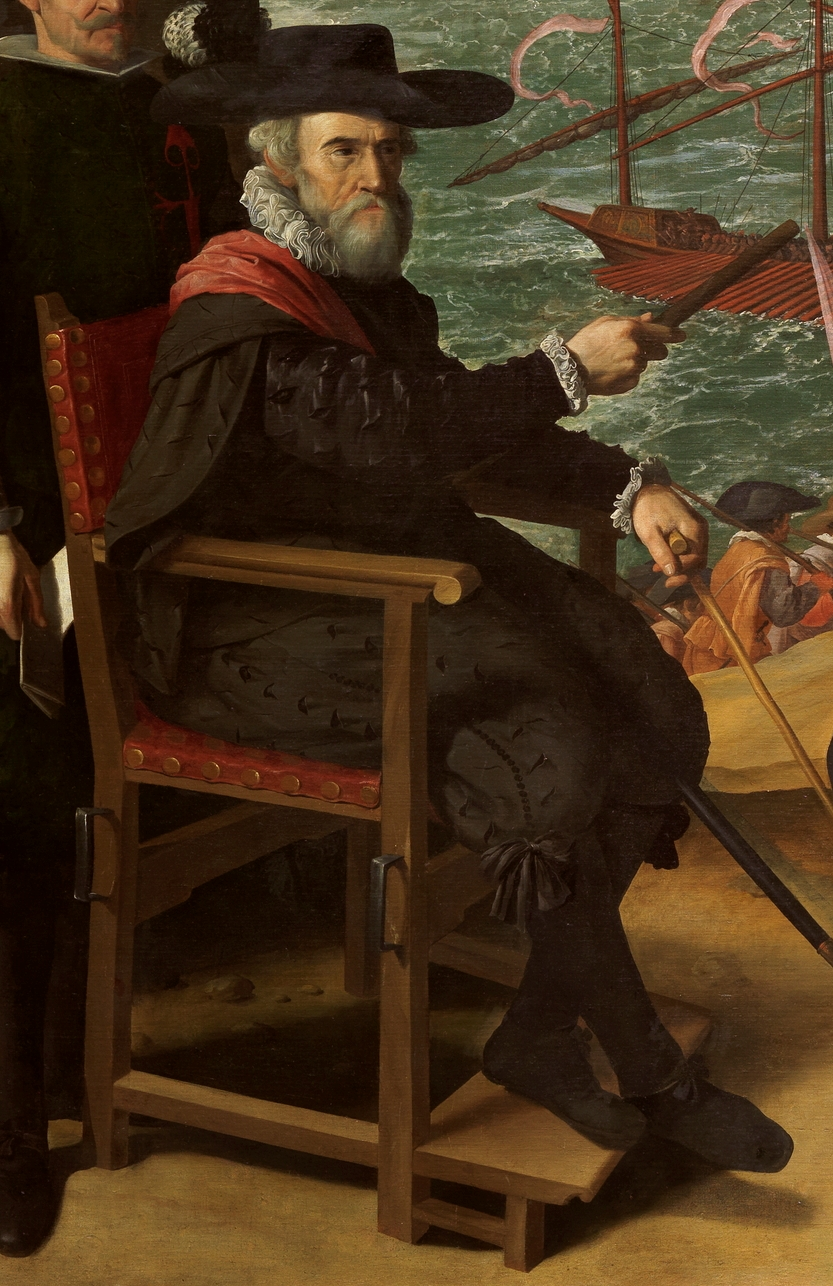
- Don Fernando is seated, because his gout prevented him from standing.
- Born: 1562; Talavera de la Reina, Castile
- Died: September 6, 1630 (aged 67–68); Talavera de la Reina
- Spouse: single
- Relatives: Sancho Hurtado Giron de Salcedo, señor de Casalegas (father); Juana de Bribiesca (mother)
- Military career
- Allegiance: (Spain) Spanish Empire

Don Fernando Girón de Salcedo y Briviesca, First Marques of Sofraga, born 1562, died 1630, was a Member of the Council of War for Flanders, and Maestre de Gampo General for Aragon with the Castellany of the Aljafería de Zaragoza, as well as Grand Chancellor and Bailiff of the Holy Sepulcher of the Order of Knights of the Hospital of Saint John of Jerusalem, and Gentleman of the Privy Chamber to Philip III and Philip IV of Spain. As governor he successfully defended Cádiz against the English in 1625, which led him to be immortalized in a painting of Francisco de Zurbarán, The Defence of Cadiz against the English.

== Career ==
Don Fernando Girón was the son of Sancho Hurtado Girón de Salcedo, Lord of Casalegas, and of Juana de Bribiesca; both being descendants of an important lineage of regidors of Talavera de la Reina. Don Fernando served as captain in the Army of Flanders, as maestro de campo of the Navy of the Ocean, and castellan of Jaca in Aragon. In 1608 he became a member of the supreme council of war. He served as an ambassador to France 1618-1620.

Back from France, Don Fernando resumed his duties as counsellor of war, and became a member of Spanish Council of State in 1622. As governor he successfully defended Cádiz against the English in 1625, which led him to be immortalized in a painting of Francisco de Zurbarán, The Defence of Cádiz against the English. In 1626 the King made him the first marquess of Sofraga, for his services to the Realm and to His Majesty personally.

Philip IV appointed Don Fernando governor-general of the Duchy of Milan in 1626, and viceroy of Navarra in 1629, but he rejected both honors due to illness, retiring to his native town, where he died in 1630. He is buried in the burial chapel of the apse of the Collegiate Church of Santa María de Talavera de la Reina. Since he died single, the title of Marquis de Sofraga fell to his nephew Sancho Girón.
