= Cádiz expedition (1625) =

1625 failed English naval expedition to attack Spain

- Part of the Anglo-Spanish War and the Thirty Years' War
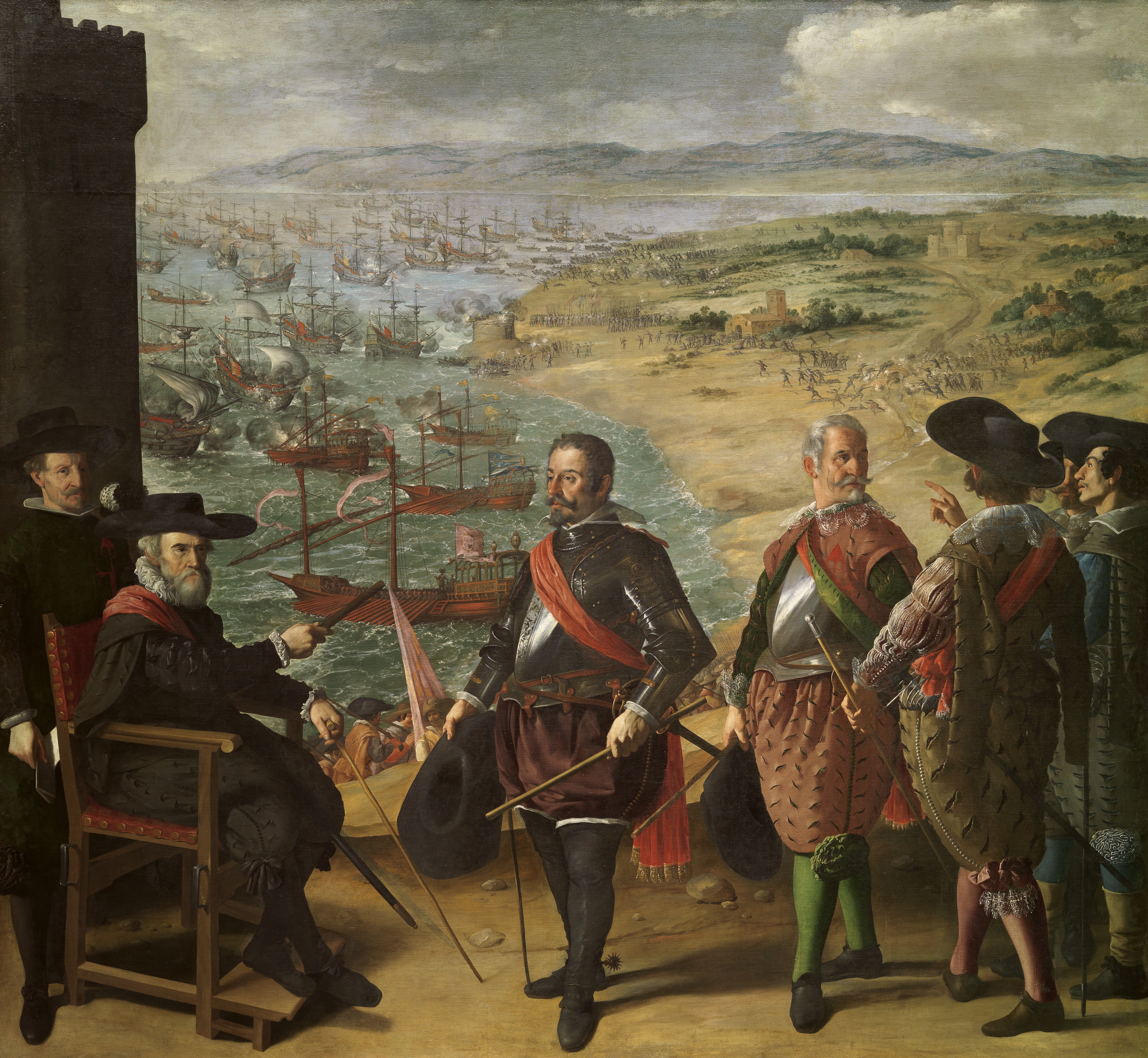
- The Defence of Cádiz Against the English; Francisco de Zurbarán, 1634
Date	1–7 November 1625
Location	Bay of Cádiz (Spain)
Result	Spanish victory

Belligerents
England; Dutch Republic	Spain

Commanders and leaders
(England) Edward Cecil (England) Robert Devereux (Dutch Republic) William of Nassau	(Spain) Juan Guzmán (Spain) Fernando Girón; Francisco Ribera

Strength
5,400 sailors 10,000 soldiers 105 ships	4,000 men in Cádiz; 2,300 men in bridge Zuazo

Casualties and losses
1,000+ killed or died of disease 30 ships	Unknown

The Cádiz expedition of 1625 was a naval expedition against Spain by English and Dutch forces. The plan was put forward because after the Dissolution of the Parliament of 1625, George Villiers, 1st Duke of Buckingham, Lord High Admiral, wanted to undertake an expedition that would match the exploits of the raiders of the Elizabethan era and in doing so, would return respect to the country and its people after the political stress of the preceding years. It was a major fiasco resulting in a Spanish victory.

== Background ==
Following an abortive trip to Spain by Prince Charles and the Duke of Buckingham to propose a marriage between Charles and the Spanish Infanta Maria Anna of Spain, the two switched positions and began advocating war with Spain. They persuaded King James to summon a new Parliament which would be invited to advise on foreign policy. The resulting Parliament of 1624 was, at least in the short run, a triumph for Charles and Buckingham, as it strongly advocated war with Spain.

However, James had a dilemma stemming from mutual distrust between himself and Parliament. He feared that if he went to war, Parliament would find an excuse to avoid providing the finances to support it. Parliament, on the other hand, feared that if it voted the finances, the King would find an excuse not to go to war. James died shortly afterwards, leaving foreign policy in the hands of Charles, who rather naively assumed that if he followed the policy that Parliament had advocated, it would provide the funds for it.

== Plan ==
War was duly declared on Spain, and Buckingham began preparations. The planned expedition involved several elements, including overtaking Spanish treasure ships coming back from the Americas loaded with gold and silver and then assaulting Spanish towns with the intention of causing stress within Spain's economy and weakening the Spanish supply chain and resources in regards to the Electorate of the Palatinate.

== Expedition ==
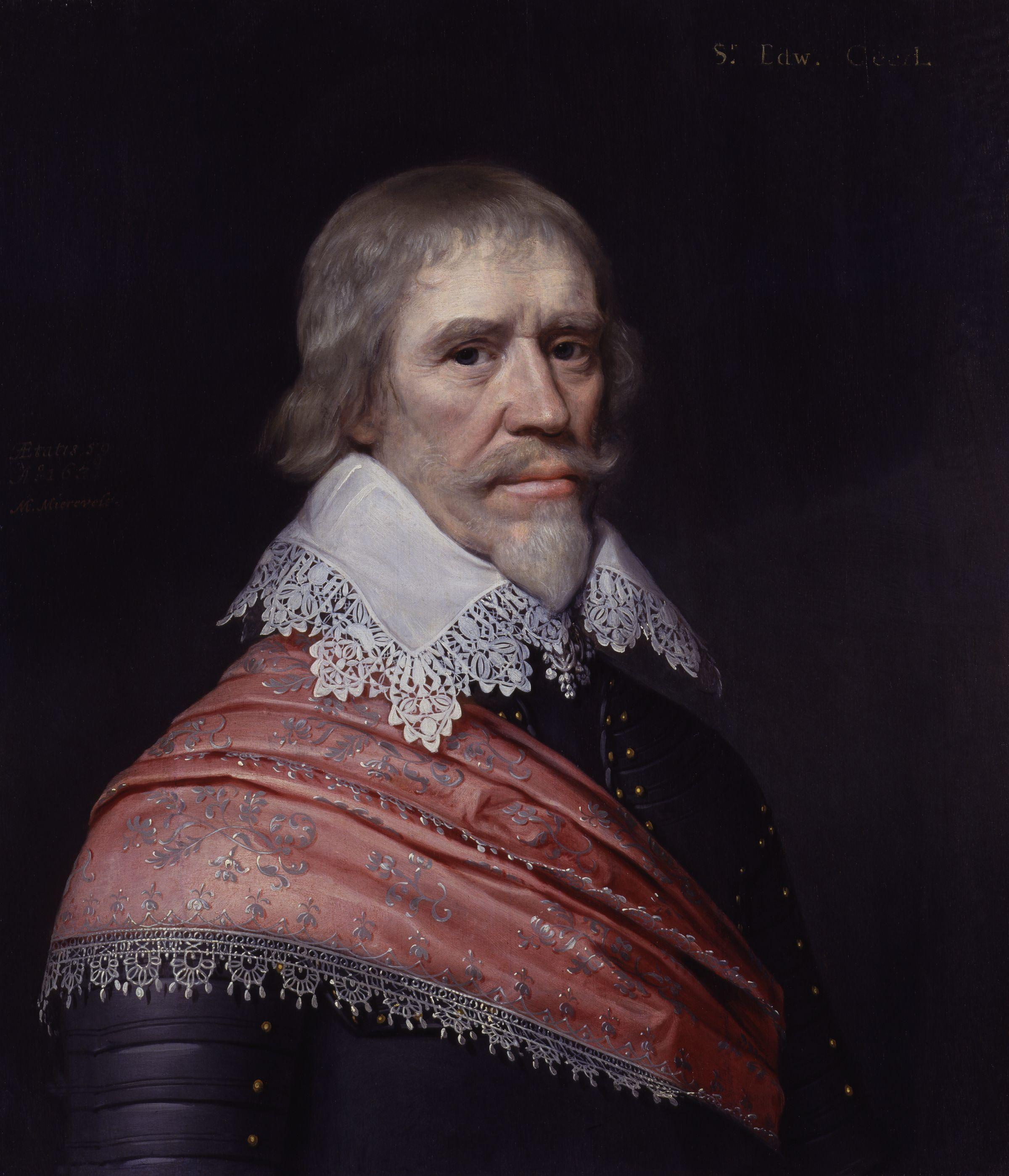
Edward Cecil, 1st Viscount Wimbledon

By October 1625, approximately 100 ships (most of which were requisitioned merchantmen) and a total of 15,000 sailors and soldiers had been readied for the expedition. An alliance with the Dutch had also been forged, and the new allies agreed to send an additional 15 warships commanded by William of Nassau, to help guard the English Channel in the absence of the main fleet. Sir Edward Cecil, a veteran who had fought alongside the Dutch, was appointed commander of the expedition by the Duke of Buckingham. The choice of commander was ill-judged, because Cecil was a good soldier but had little knowledge of the sea.

The expedition began from Plymouth Sound on 6 October 1625, but the voyage was plagued with difficulties. Stormy weather threatened the ships, rendering many of them barely seaworthy and causing major delays. By the time the fleet escaped from the storms and arrived in Spanish waters, it had become apparent that they were too poorly supplied to conduct the mission properly and that they were too late to engage the Spanish treasure fleet because of the storms they had encountered; in any case, the treasure fleet had used a more southerly passage than usual.

=== Composition of Fleet ===
Wimbledon's fleet was composed of three squadrons, of which the primary vessels were:
(a) The Admiral's Squadron

- Anne Royal, Captain Sir Thomas Love, with flag of the Admiral, Sir Edward Cecil.
- St Andrew, Captain Watts, with flag of the Vice-Admiral, Lord Denbigh.
- Convertine, Captain Thomas Porter, with flag of the Rear-Admiral, Sir William St Leger.
- with 4 groups of transports each mounting ten or twelve guns, and carrying in all four regiments of one thousand men; also one victualler. In all, thirty ships.

(b) The Vice-Admiral's Squadron

- Swiftsure, Captain Sir S. Argall, with flag of the Admiral, Robert Devereux
- St George, Captain Gilbert, with flag of the Vice-Admiral, Lord Valentia.
- Constant Reformation, Captain Greeves, with flag of the Rear-Admiral, Lord de la Ware.
- with 4 similar groups of transports, of which one, however, carried no troops. In all, twenty-nine ships.

(c) The Rear-Admiral's Squadron

- Lion, Captain Mitchell, with flag of the Admiral, Sir Francis Steward.
- Rainbow, Captain John Chidley, with flag of the Vice-Admiral, Lord Cromwell.
- Bonaventure, Captain Collins, with flag of the Rear-Admiral, Sir Henry Palmer.
- with 4 groups of troopships similar to those of the vice-admiral's squadron. In all, thirty ships.

In addition to those named above, the other English warships were the Assurance, Dreadnought, Mary Rose and the pinnace Mercury. The Dutch also provided sixteen ships, under Lieut-Admiral Willem de Zoete, so that the total fleet rose to well over a hundred vessels.

=== Cádiz ===
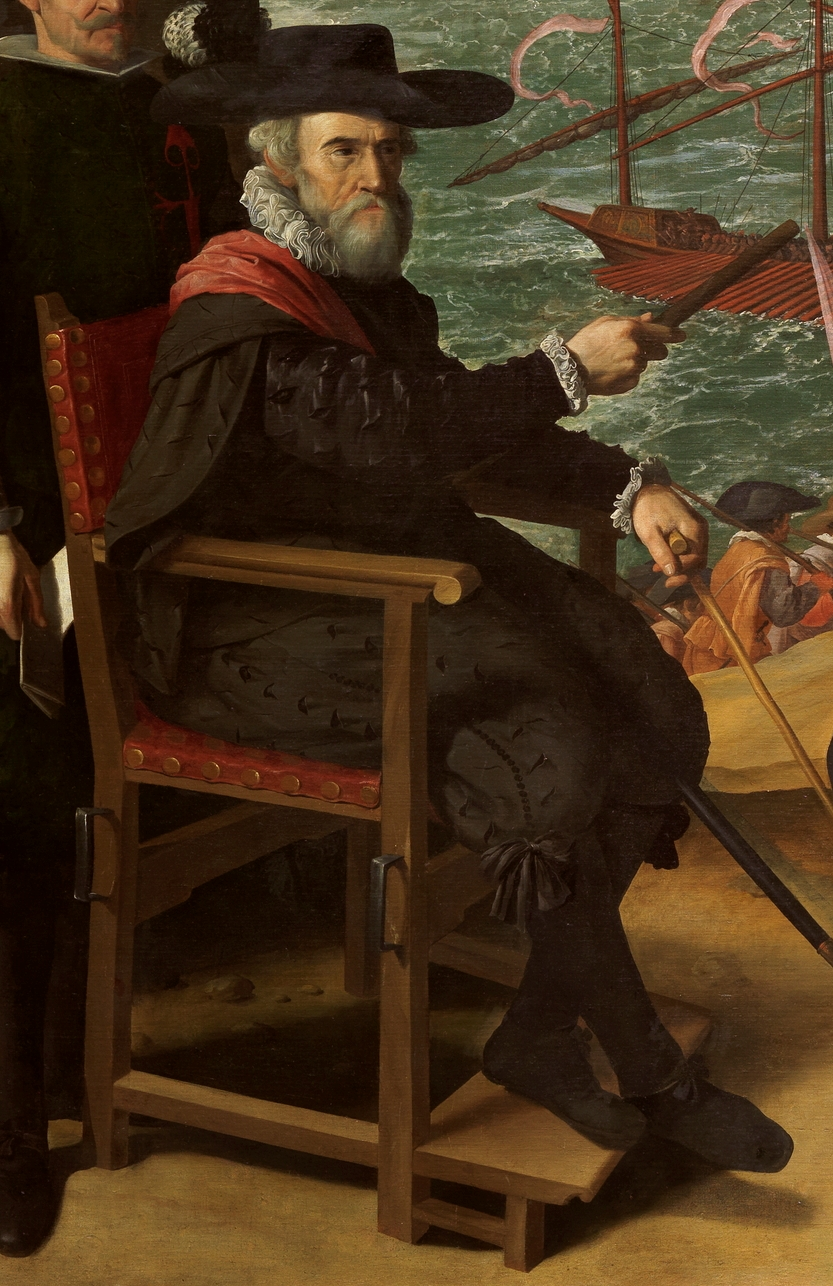
Fernando Girón de Salcedo, commanding the defence of Cádiz.

Cecil chose to assault the Spanish city of Cádiz and after successfully sailing to the Bay of Cádiz and landing his force, he was able to take the fort that guarded the harbour of the city. However, he soon found that the city itself had been heavily fortified with modern defences, and he then began to make serious errors. Spanish vessels that were open to capture were able to get away because most of his forces waited for orders and did not act. The Spanish ships then sailed to the safety of Puerto Real, in the easternmost anchorage of the bay.

The ships used in the assault were also largely merchant vessels conscripted and converted for warfare, and the captains or owners of those ships, concerned about the welfare of their ships, left much of the battle to the Dutch.

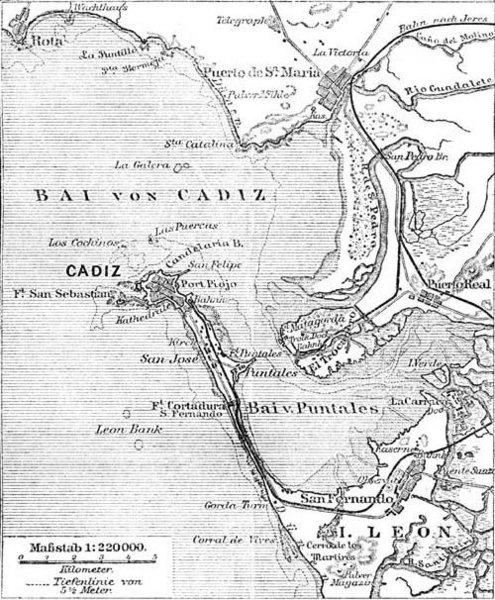
Map of Cádiz (1888)

The attack on and capture of El Puntal tower proved a mistake, as that fortification did not need to be captured to be able to attack Cádiz.

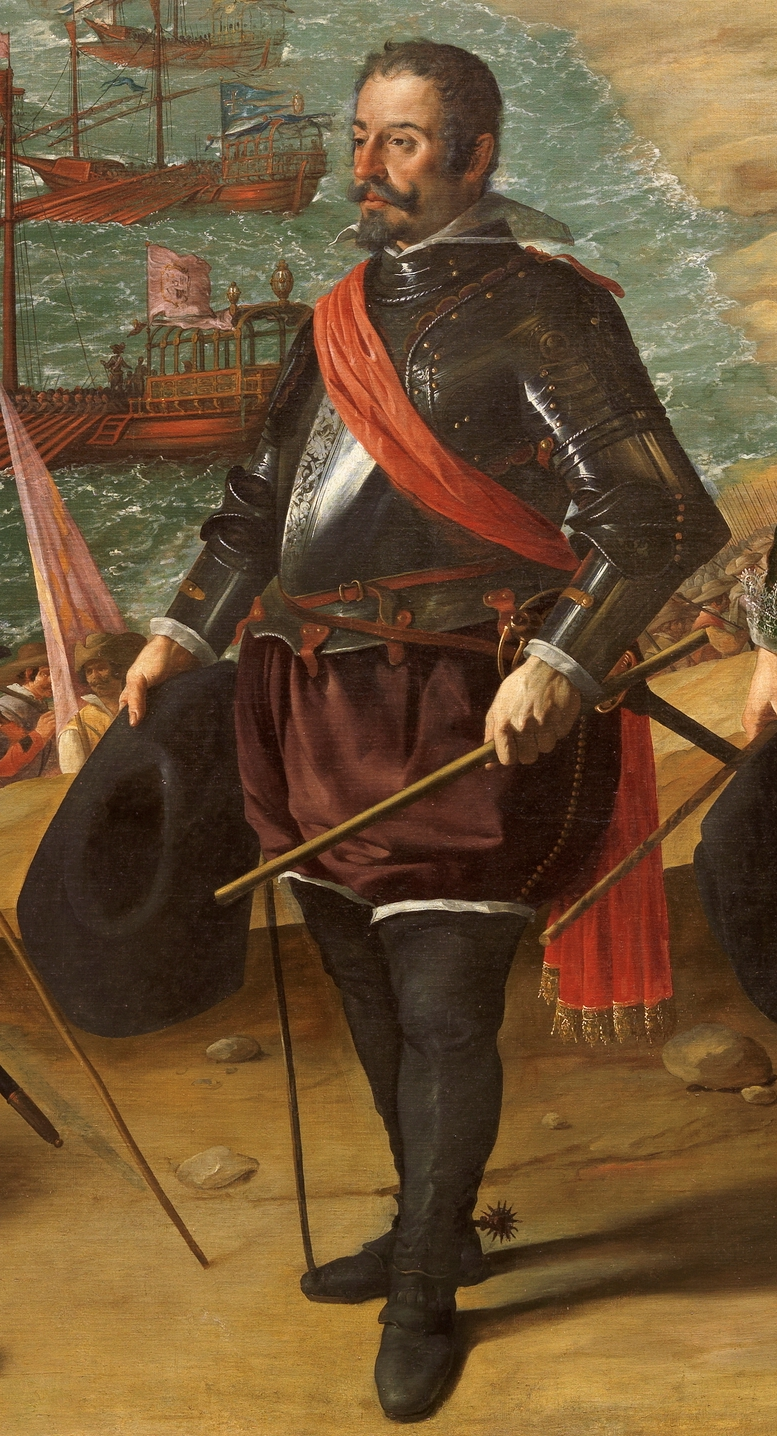
Diego Ruiz, the deputy field commander at the defence of Cádiz.

When Cecil landed his forces, they realised that they had no food or drink with them. Cecil then made the foolish decision to allow the men to drink from the wine vats found in the local houses. A wave of drunkenness ensued, with few or none of Cecil's force remaining sober. Realizing what he had done, Cecil took the only course left open to him and ordered his soldiers to return to their ships. When the Spanish army arrived, they found over 1,000 English soldiers still drunk; although every man was armed, not a single shot was fired as the Spanish put them all to the sword.

=== Spanish galleons ===
After the fiasco at Cádiz, Cecil decided to try to intercept a fleet of Spanish galleons that were bringing resources back from the New World. That failed as well because the ships had been warned of danger in the waters and so were able to take another route and returned home without any trouble from Cecil's ships.

=== Return ===
Disease and sickness were sweeping through the ranks, and since the ships were in a bad state, Cecil finally decided that there was no alternative but to return to England although he had captured few or no goods and made little impact on Spain. Therefore, in December, the fleet returned home; the expedition had cost the English an estimated £250,000 and resulted in the attackers suffering 1,000 dead and losing 30 ships.

== Aftermath ==
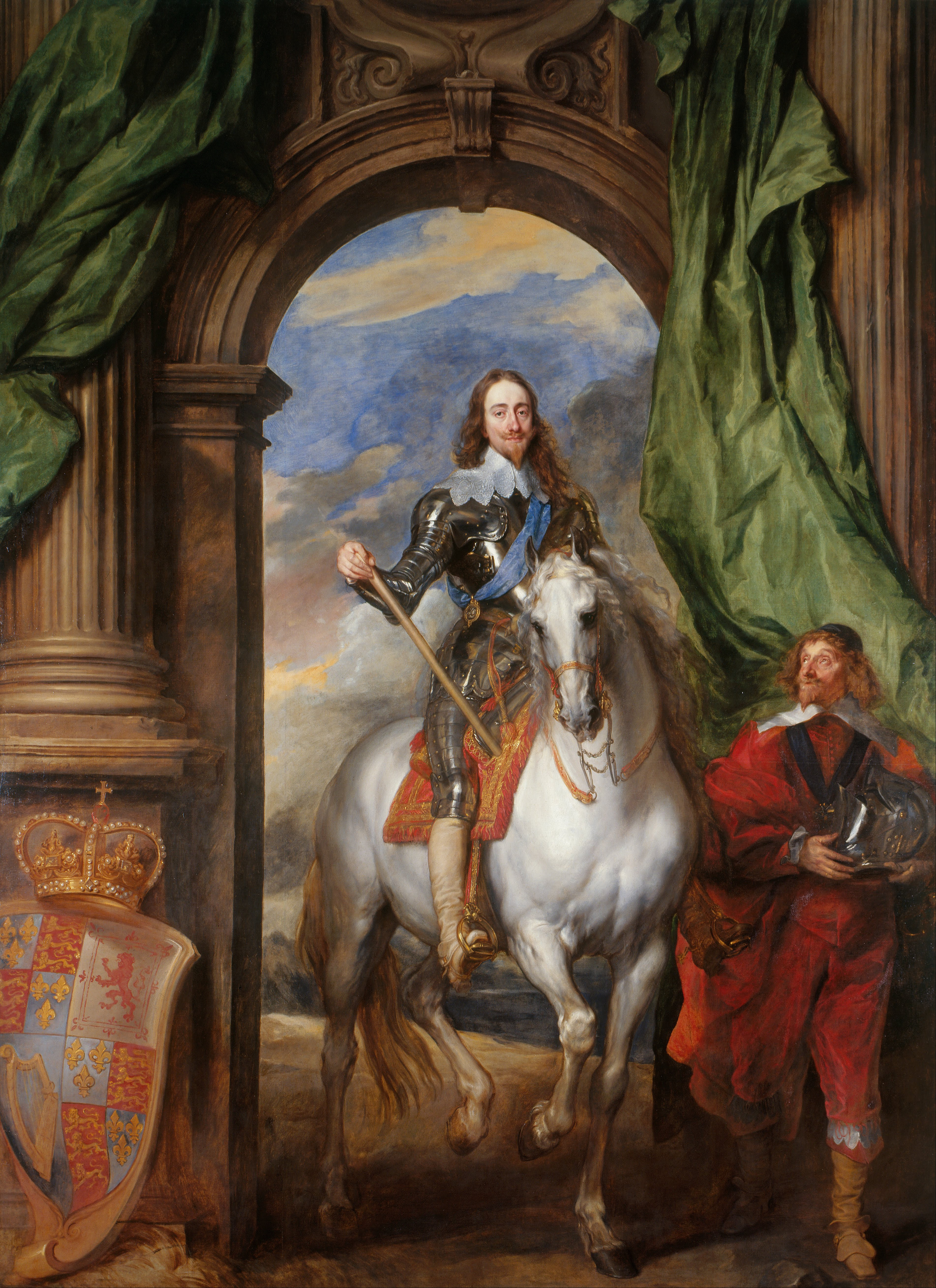
King Charles I of England

The failure of the attack had serious political repercussions in England. Charles I, to protect his own dignity and his favourite, Buckingham, who should have at least made sure the ships were well supplied, made no effort to enquire about the failure of the expedition. He turned a blind eye but instead interested himself in the plight of the Huguenots of La Rochelle.

The House of Commons was less forgiving. The Parliament of 1626 began the process of impeachment against Buckingham. Eventually, Charles chose to dissolve Parliament rather than risk a successful impeachment.

== See also ==
- Annus mirabilis

== Sources ==
Roger Manning, Oxford (2006), An Apprenticeship in Arms: The Origins of the British Army 1585–1702
