= Charles Morgan (military governor) =

Welsh soldier (1575–1642)

Sir Charles Morgan
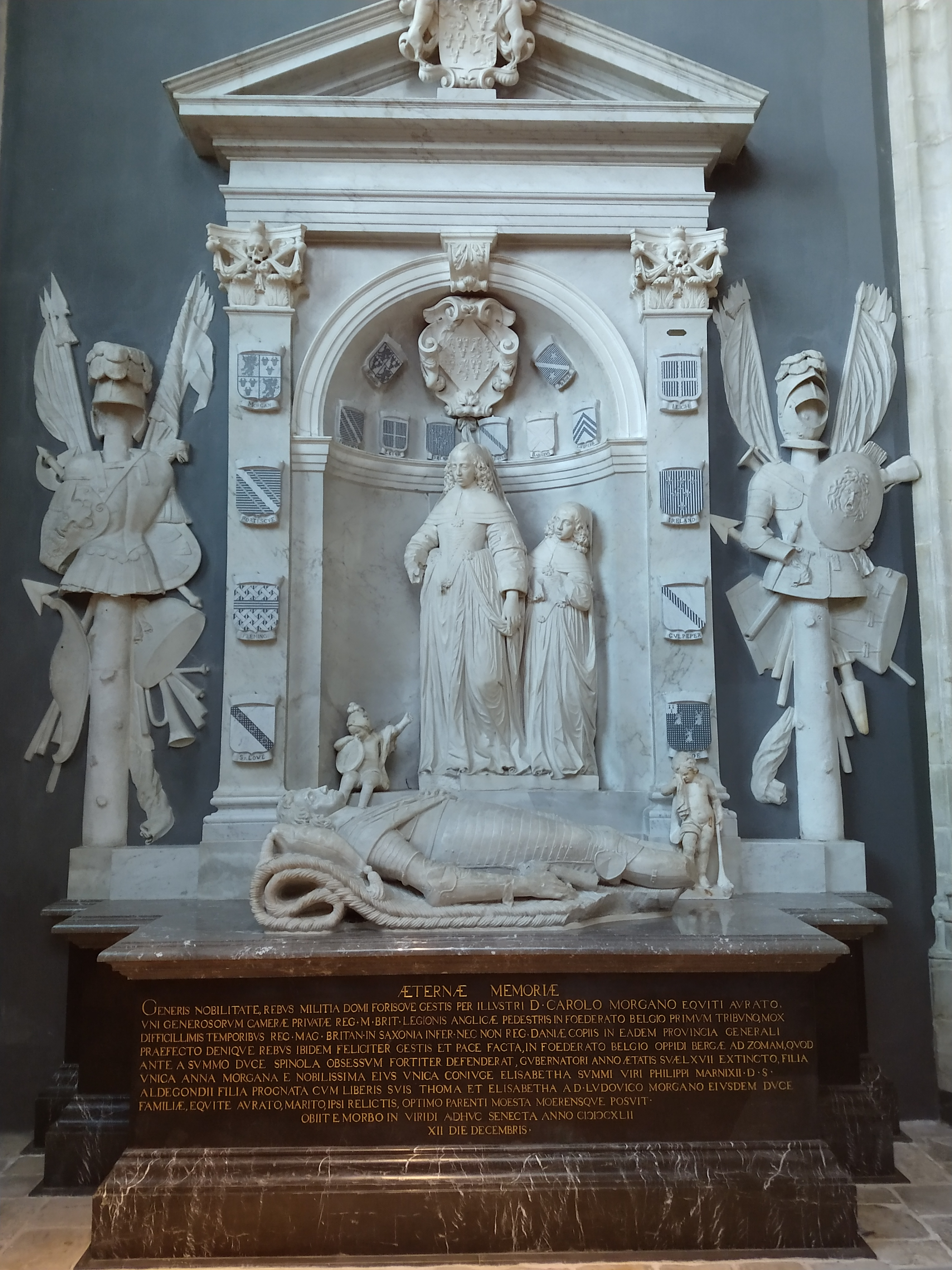
- Tomb of Charles Morgan (1576-1643) by François Dieussart, Gertrudiskerk, Bergen op Zoom

Governor of Bergen op Zoom
- In office 1637–1643

Personal details
- Born: 1576 Monmouthshire, Wales
- Died: March 1643 (aged 66–67) Bergen op Zoom
- Resting place: Gertrudiskerk
- Spouse: Eliza Marnix (her death)
- Children: Anne (died 1688)
- Parent(s): Edward Morgan (1530–1585); Frances Leigh

Military service
- Rank: Lieutenant-General
- Battles/wars: Eighty Years War; Cádiz; Nieuwpoort; Ostend; Bergen op Zoom; Breda (1624); Breda (1637); Thirty Years War; Siege of Stade

Sir Charles Morgan (1575–1642) was a professional soldier from Monmouthshire in Wales who spent most of his career serving with the Dutch States Army during the Eighty Years War and eventually settled there.

== Service in the Netherlands ==
Morgan began his military career in the Netherlands during the Dutch Revolt. There he married Elizabeth, the daughter of William the Silent's secretary, Philips of Marnix. He was a part of the joint Anglo-Dutch expedition which captured the Spanish city of Cádiz in 1596. Under the command of Sir Francis Vere, Morgan fought at the Battle of Nieuwpoort in 1600 and in 1601 served in the defence of the city of Ostend. Morgan left the besieged city in 1603 to receive a knighthood from James I in England, and returned before the city was surrendered to the Spanish on 20 September 1604.

== Justice of the peace ==
After the fall of Ostend, Morgan returned to Wales and served as a Justice of the peace (JP) in Monmouthshire. He was heavily criticised by the Bishop of Hereford Robert Bennet, who accused him of being overly lenient towards recusants, thereby encouraging Catholic rioting. He was briefly imprisoned for failing his duties as a JP, after he left for London whilst riots were ongoing in south Wales.

== Return to the Netherlands ==
Morgan returned to the Netherlands in 1607, and remained there during the Twelve Years' Truce. When hostilities recommenced he returned to combat, commanding the English forces at the Siege of Bergen op Zoom, and serving in defence of the besieged city of Breda. His military prowess was praised by the Venetian ambassador to The Hague, who described him as one of the most accomplished officers of the Dutch campaign.

== Danish expedition ==
In 1626, Charles I's uncle Christian IV of Denmark faced a heavy defeat at the Battle of Lutter to forces of the Catholic League commanded by Marshall Tilly. In response the English Privy Council appointed Morgan head of a military expedition to aid the Danish King. Morgan initially amassed 5,013 men, over half of whom had deserted by the time the regiments embarked from Enkhuizen for Denmark in March 1627. He blamed the desertions on the inexperience of his officers, many of whom were amongst the deserters. Morgan built a sconce on the river Weser from which he stopped supplies from the nearby city of Bremen reaching Tilly. Morgan's numbers were raised back to 4,913 in June through forced impressment, as he relocated to the confluence of the Weser and the Aller. Payment for the troops arrived irregularly and by July Morgan described his regiments as being too mutinous to defend themselves against enemy attack. By September he had been reduced to under 2,000 men, a quarter of whom were not fit for service. They were accompanied by 1,700 Dutch troops. As the situation worsened Morgan withdrew his troops to the city of Stade.

In 1628, Morgan's regiments were surviving on what he described as a diet of cats and dogs. Stade's outworks were captured by Tilly who besieged the city and in one attack killed 500 of Morgan's men. In March, short on provisions and out of money, Morgan wrote to the Duke of Buckingham pleading for more support. Christian wrote to Morgan promising to send troops, but reneged on his promise. Morgan surrendered Stade on 28 April, having received no support from Buckingham or Christian. The sick and wounded were sent to Christian's fortress at Glückstadt, while Morgan accompanied his remaining troops to the Netherlands. There he was temporarily put under arrest for debt he had accrued in paying his men. He returned with his troops to England in June. In an audience with the king in July, he emphasised the need for pay and provisions for his regiments. He was ordered to return to Denmark, and on 31 October he arrived at Glückstadt with 1,200 men. Due to disputes with the town governor, his troops did not land until 1 December. He once again faced difficulties paying his troops. In England, Parliament was unwilling to support sending more troops to Denmark, instead proposing a public day of fasting. In March Morgan joined with the English companies that had wintered in Denmark as well as Scottish and Dutch troops, raising the number under his command to over 4,700. He successfully seized the island of Nordstrand from the Duke of Holstein-Gottorp. In June, Christian announced a truce, and Morgan's troops were sent off to Holland with little ceremony.

== Final years ==
After the Danish expedition, Morgan returned to service in the Netherlands. In 1631 he was briefly held captive by Dunkirk privateers. He fought for the Prince of Orange during the Siege of Breda. He spent his final years as governor of Bergen op Zoom, where he died in 1642.
