= The Greyhound, Portsmouth =

Historic pub (now hotel) in Old Portsmouth, England

Coordinates: 50°47′29″N 1°06′03″W

Greyhound Pub
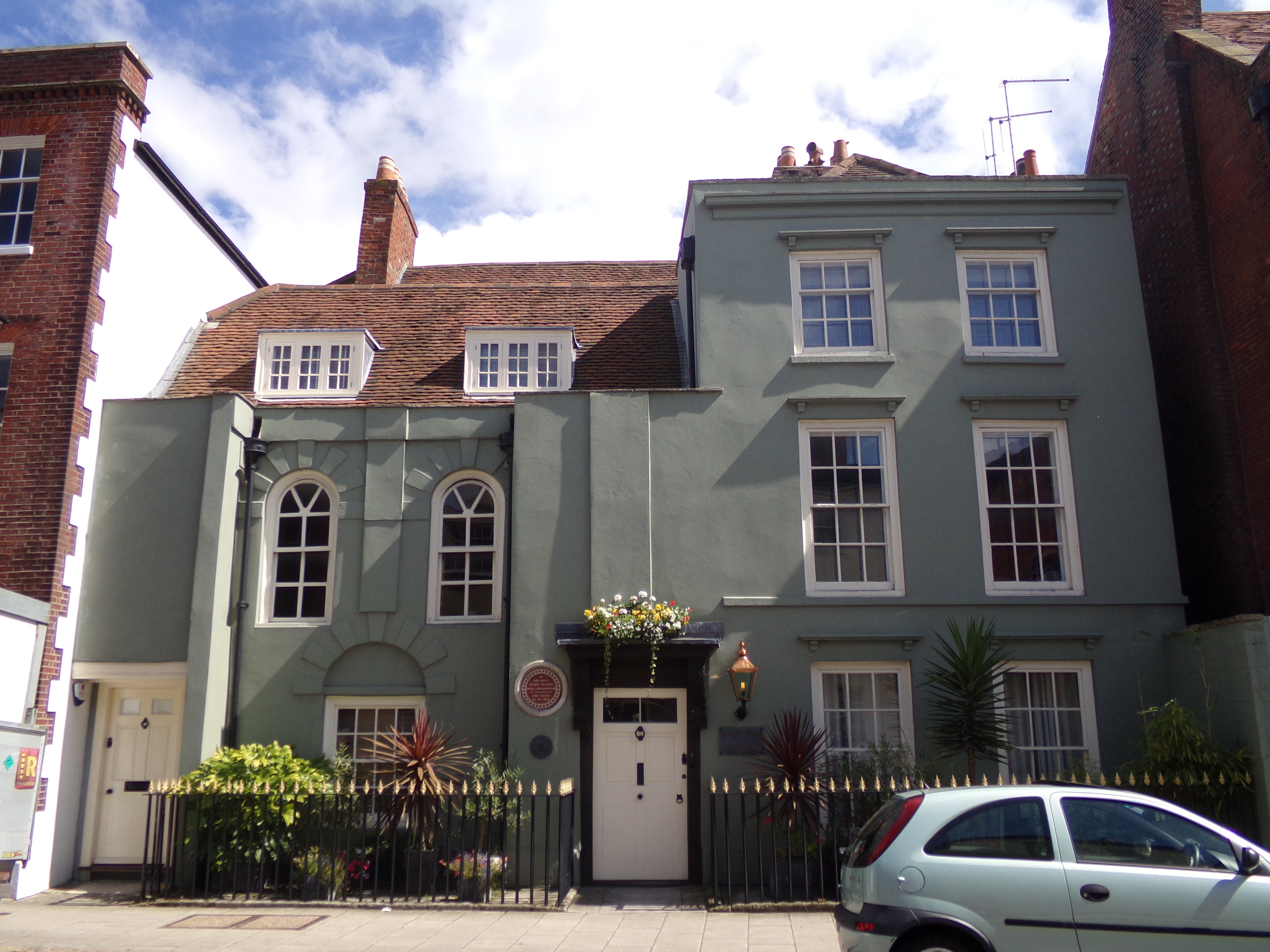
- Interactive map of the Greyhound Pub area

General information
- Type: Public house
- Location: England

The Greyhound was a pub (popularly known as "The Spotted Dog"), in High Street, Old Portsmouth, England. It is the site of the murder of George Villiers, 1st Duke of Buckingham in 1628. It is now a hotel.

== Architecture and conservation ==
The building is timber-framed, but this is not evident from outside as it has been refronted. It became a private building called Buckingham House and was listed under that name in 1953.

== In letters ==
The murder site was toured by the diarist and Royal Navy administrator Samuel Pepys on May 2, 1661. Pepys was accompanied by his wife Elisabeth, along with his Republican clerk Tom Hayter and wife, and the Earl of Sandwich's Puritan secretary John Creed (Pepys' Diary, 2 May).

== Present ==
The building bears a commemorative plaque to mark the assassination. It is now a hotel called ‘Ye Spotted Dogge’.
