= Spinola's campaign of 1605–1606 =

Campaign during the Eighty Years' War

- Part of the Eighty Years' War
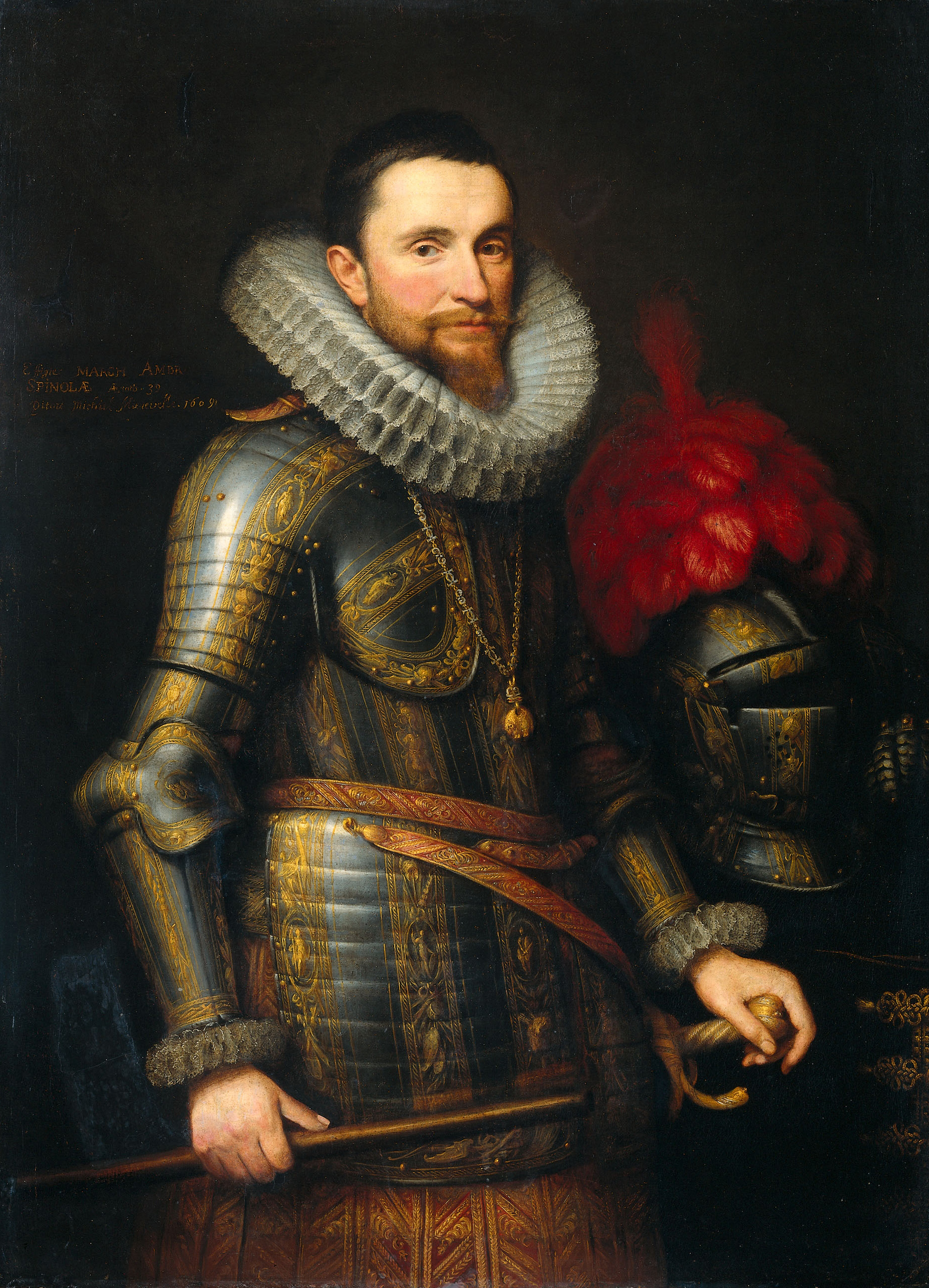
- Portrait of Ambrogio Spinola (c. 1609), by Michiel Jansz. van Mierevelt
Date	1605–1606
Location	Low Countries and along the Lower Rhine
Result	Spanish victory
Territorial changes	Spain captures Oldenzaal, Lingen, Wachtendonk, Groenlo, and Rheinberg

Belligerents
Spanish Empire	Dutch Republic

Commanders and leaders
(Spanish Empire) Ambrogio Spinola (Spanish Empire) Count of Bucquoy	(Dutch Republic) Maurice of Nassau (Dutch Republic) Frederick Henry

Spinola's campaign was launched by the Spanish crown in 1605 as a response to Maurice of Nassau's territorial expansion within the Habsburg Netherlands during his ten years campaign. During this campaign, Spanish forces commanded by Ambrogio Spinola successfully conquered cities along the Rhine and advanced into the eastern provinces of the Dutch Republic.

== Background ==
In 1595, Albert VII, the Archduke of Austria was sent to the Habsburg Netherlands to succeed his brother Ernest as the governor of the Spanish Netherlands who had died that year in order to restore the Spanish position within the Netherlands against the Dutch revolt. Although Albert captured Hulst in 1596, the Spanish faced bankruptcy in 1597, leading to a series of military defeats against the Republic. During Maurice's campaign, he captured the remaining cities north of the Rhine as well as the strategic stronghold of Rheinberg. In 1600, Albert lost the Battle of Nieuwpoort against Anglo-Dutch forces, and so in 1601, Philip III of Spain sent the Genoan Ambrogio Spinola to the Netherlands, who helped Albert in besieging and finally capturing Ostend after a 3 year long siege that resulted in more than 100,000 people either killed, wounded or captured. But failed to relieve Sluis in 1604.

== Campaign ==
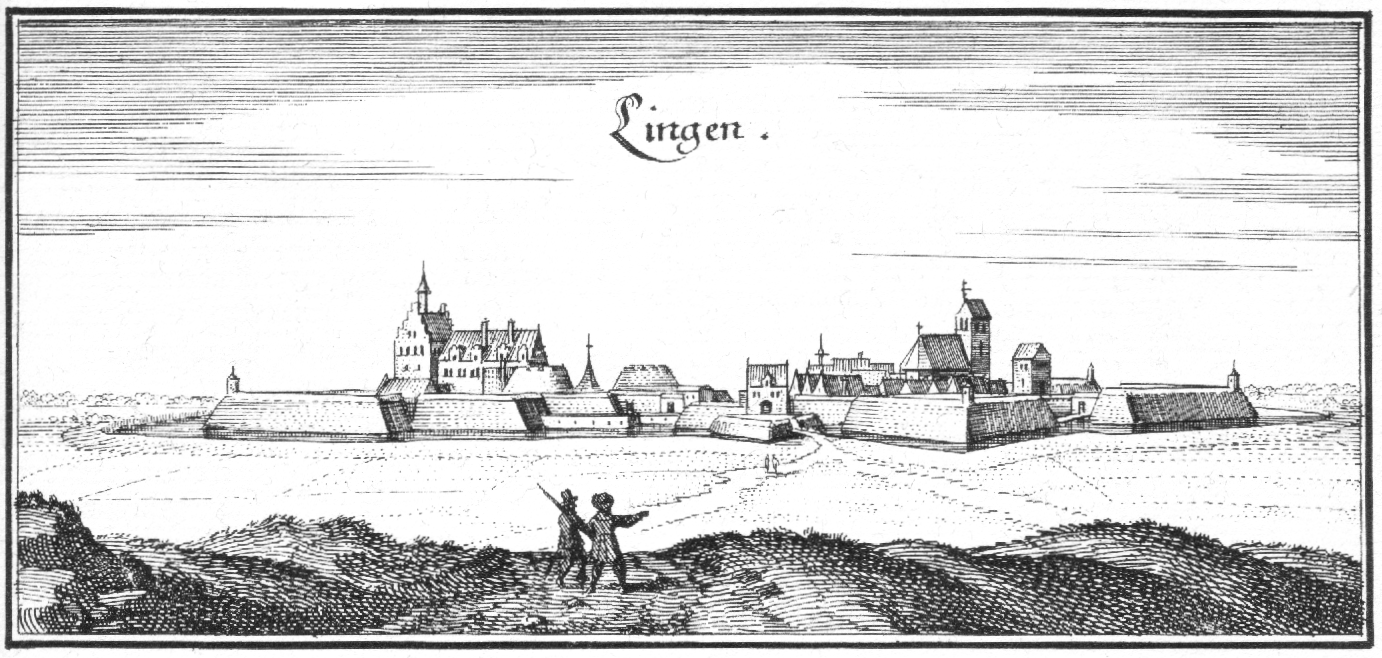
The siege of Lingen

Spinola left Ostend on 6 July 1605, leading an army of 15,000 men, and crossed the Rhine near Kaiserswerth to begin his campaign. Throughout the operation, he was regularly assisted by the Count of Bucquoy, who also achieved notable military successes.

=== Capture of Oldenzaal ===
With the 15,000 men, Spinola first marched towards Oldenzaal and arrived before the city on the 8th of August, which was defended by a garrison that consisted of three companies. Spinola began digging trenches the same night, and the day after began to fire with artillery. The same day the city started negotiations and surrendered the same day. After capturing Oldenzaal, Spinola marched straight towards Lingen.

=== Siege of Lingen ===
On 10 August, just two days after capturing Oldenzaal, Spinola laid siege to the fortified town of Lingen in the Ems valley. The city was defended by a garrison of 500 to 1,000 men under the command of Maerten Cobben. The news of Oldenzaal falling and Lingen being besieged arrived to the Dutch headquarters on the same day. The garrison, expecting an attempted relief by Maurice of Nassau, tried their best to defend the city and hold out as long as possible before Maurice and his relief force arrived. After 9 days the expected relief by Maurice never came, and Spinola urged that the city surrendered, which they did on the same day.

=== Attacks on Bergen op Zoom ===
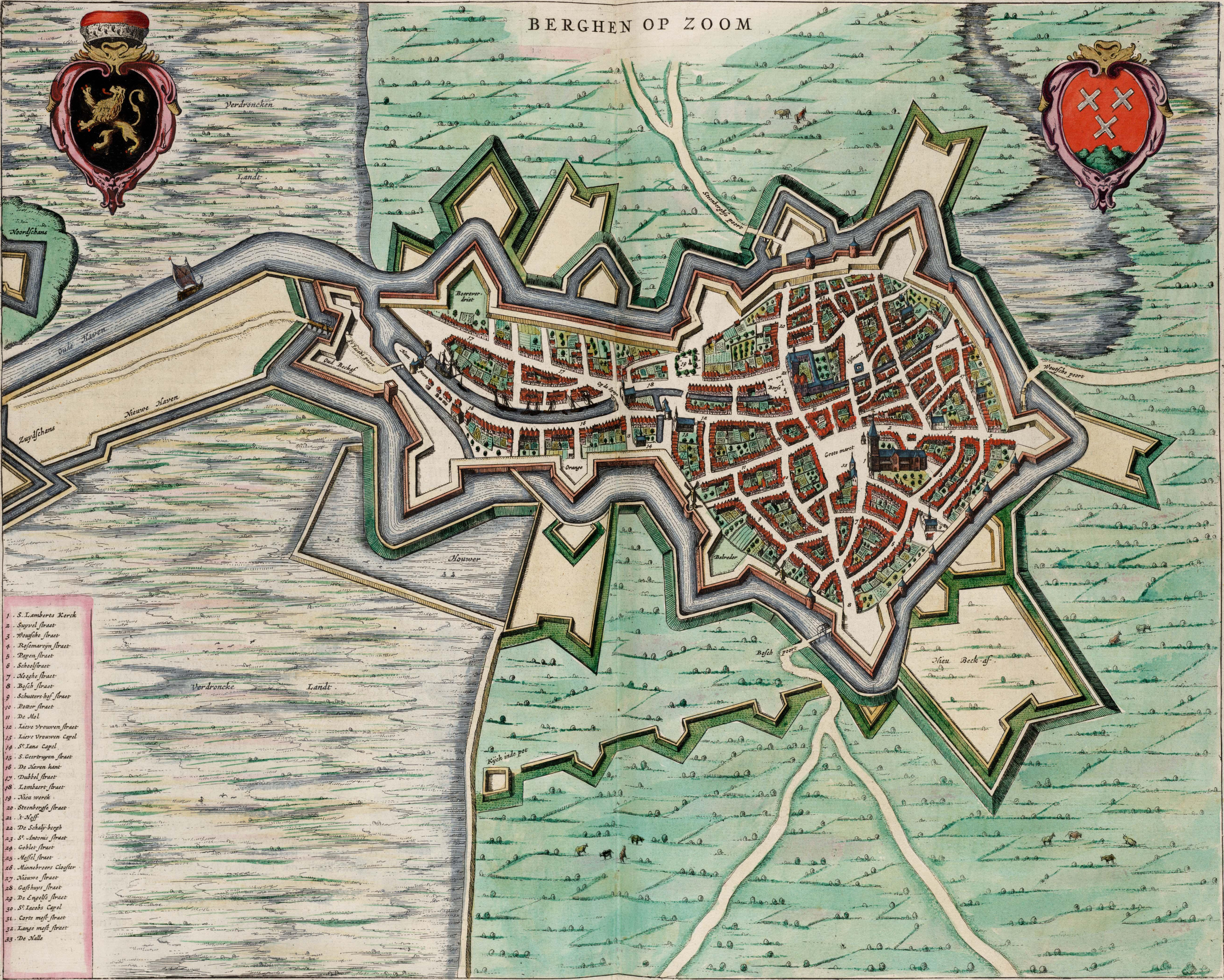
Depiction of Bergen op Zoom

On the 23rd of August, a Spanish army under Du Terrail arrived before Bergen op Zoom in order to try and capture the city by surprise. Du Terrail and his army carried out two separate attacks. The Spanish forces made significant progress during their initial assault and came close to capturing the city. However, as they were advancing towards the city gate, the garrison, under command of Paulus Bax was alerted and began to bombard the Spanish with every weapon they had available. At daybreak, as water levels were rising, the Spanish forces were forced to retreat. A month later, on the 21st of September, the Spanish tried again. Though this time, the Dutch were more aware of the possibility of a Spanish attack on their city. Although the element of surprise was gone, the Spanish still decided to attack. Even in the pouring rain, the Spanish still attacked the city from 5 sides. The commander of the city, Paulus Bax, provided the citizens with weaponry. Due to the city now being properly manned with an adequate garrison, the second attack was also repelled. Two gates of the city were bombarded and captured by Spanish soldiers, the last gate however was fiercely defended by Dutch soldiers, women and children. The Spanish had to retreat by morning, and had suffered more than a hundred casualties, while Dutch casualties were light.

=== Battle of Mülheim ===
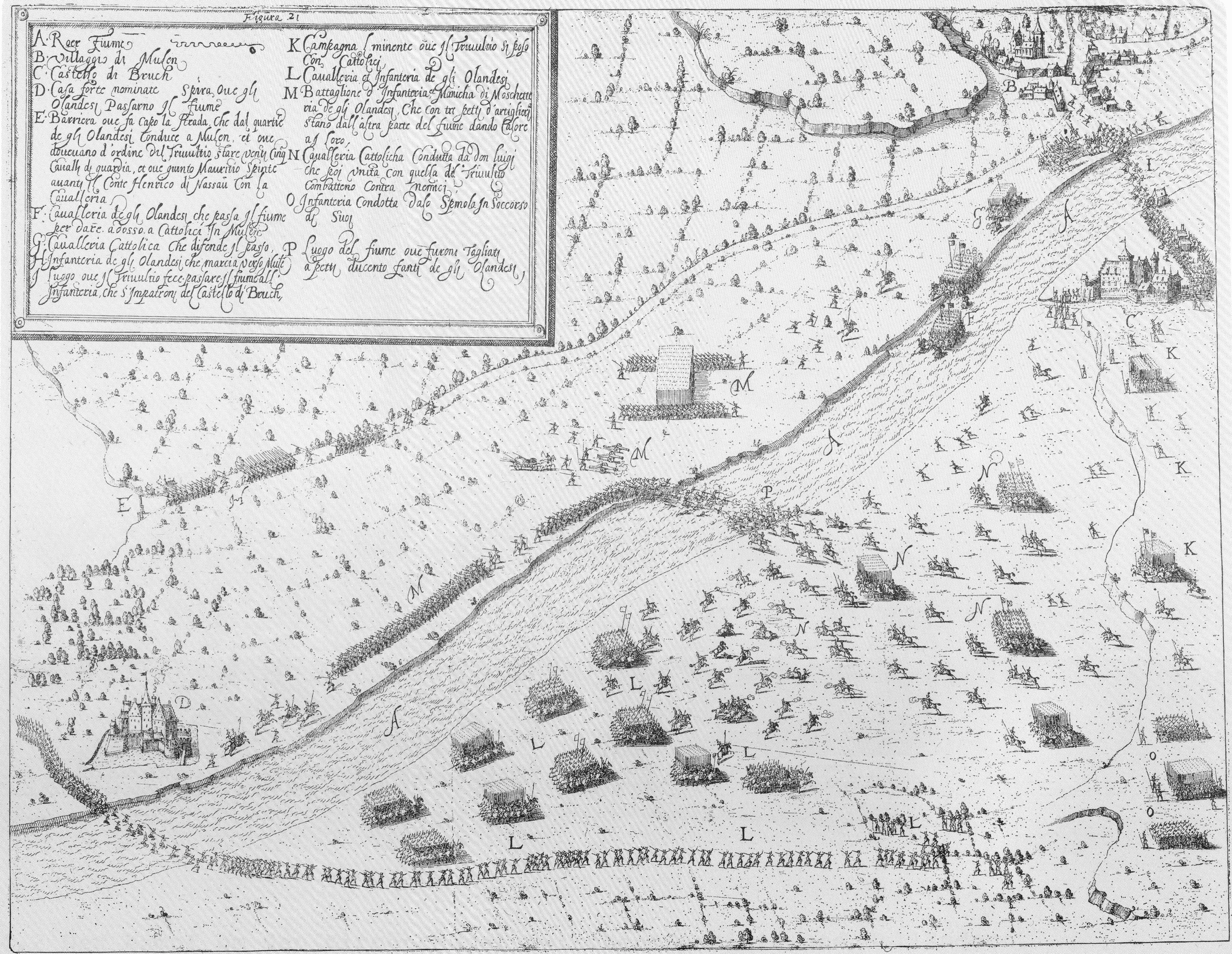
The battle of Mülheim

In the autumn of 1605, Ambrogio Spinola encamped his army in the Ruhr area between Duisburg and Ruhrort. From there, an army of around 4,000 men marched towards Mülheim an der Ruhr and Broich Castle in order to occupy them. Maurice of Nassau, who was encamped near Wesel received news of this. Together with his half brother Frederick Henry and the commander Marcellus Bax, who was an experienced soldier during the battle of Turnhout. The Dutch marched with an army of the same strength of the Spanish and attacked the Spanish forces by surprise on the 9th of October. Bax crossed the Ruhr and captured the castle without a fight, Bax also cut off the Spanish lines in case they were to retreat. Although everything went well for the Dutch forces, Frederick Henry at one point was cornered and a part of Maurice's army fled the battlefield. Maurice first had to relieve Frederick, but he no longer had proper control over his cavalry, and had to retreat.

=== Siege of Wachtendonk ===
After Spinola was victorious at the battle of Mülheim, he set his eyes on Coevorden, but he had to abandon that idea. He laid his eyes on Wachtendonk instead, he sent the Count of Bucquoy with an army of 6,000 men towards the city. Due to favourable weather, the Spanish had been able to storm the city a few times already, which meant that the occupation had weakened. Due to the favourable weather, Bucquoy had been able to dig canals and trenches within 7 days. After a few days, Buqcuoy was able to capture a bastion which allowed him to conquer the city. On the 27th of October, negotiations began for surrender, which happened the next day. The garrison was allowed to leave with the honours of war.

=== Siege of Krakau Castle ===
After capturing Wachtendonk, Spinola sent the Count of Bucqouy to Krakau Castle, near Krefeld. The castle was under the leadership of the governor van Swieten, and a garrison of 400 men. Though the governor had no authority over the garrison. The siege began on the 8th of November. The soldiers fled from the Ravelin to the castle. In the castle itself, the soldiers had to surrender and the castle was left in Spanish hands.

=== Siege of Bredevoort ===
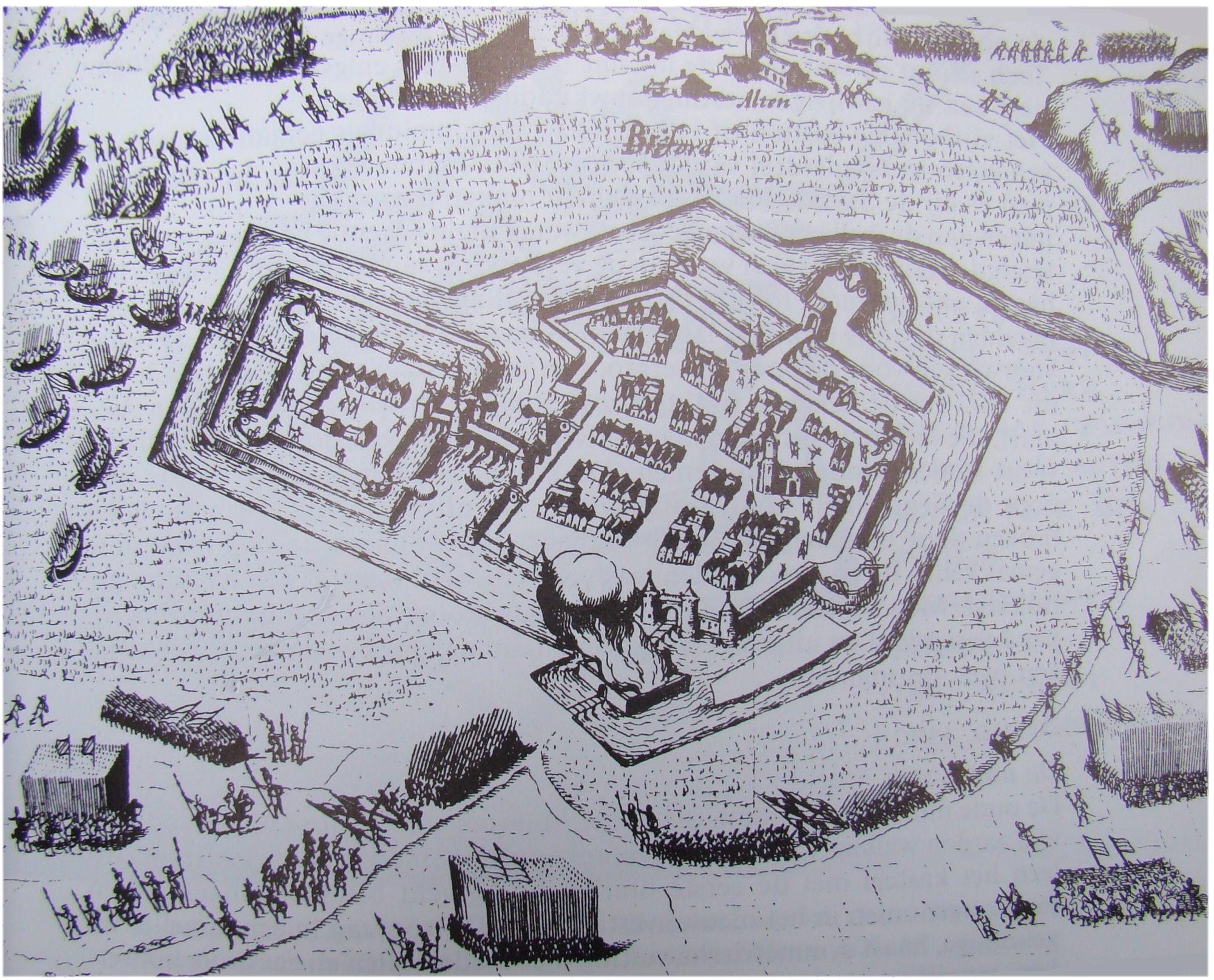
The relief of Bredevoort

The Spanish, under the command of Guielmo Verdugo entered the city after falsely declaring themselves to be soldiers of the States army. Once inside, the Spanish plundered the city. From surrounding citites troops were immediately sent to Bredevoort in order to prevent the Spanish from strengthening themselves within the city. Though the Spanish did attempt to help the Spanish within Bredevoort from Ruhrort, but when these reinforcements saw that the Dutch had already encamped themselves outside the city, the left in a hurry, leaving behind all of their supplies, including food and gunpowder, this meant that Verdugo was now starving. Local farmers that found those supplies sold it to the Dutch soldiers for reasonable prices. Verdugo's position within Bredevoort did not improve, since the city was shot at from all sides. Frederick Henry also arrived before the city with a cavalry contingent, Verdugo saw that he had no chance, and had to surrender.

=== Battle of the Berkumerbridge ===
After Bredevoort, Spinola had sent a part of his forces to Almelo to sail down the Regge and Vecht with ships that contained reinforcements. Once the Spanish arrived near Mastenbroek, the Spanish conquered Fort Kijk and started to besiege the city of Zwolle on the side of the city that was not fortified. While that happened, Gerard van Warmelo spotted the Spanish ships. Aware of their intentions, he rushed towards the Berkumer bridge with three infantry companies and one cavalry company. On the 2nd of August, a fierce battle between Dutch and Spanish forces ensued. The Dutch army tried to prevent the Spanish from reaching the Zwartewatersdijk on the other side, in which the Dutch succeeded. The battle resulted in heavy casualties and the Spanish had to retreat.

=== Siege of Lochem ===
After Bredevoort, Spinola tried to gain a foothold in the Veluwe and the Betuwe. But he had to abandon that idea after his army was cut off by Maurice. However, Spinola did manage to conquer Groenlo and Lochem. Out of fear of facing Spinola on the battlefield again after Mülheim, Maurice severely doubted in trying to recapture the city. On the 24th of October Count Ernest Casimir arrived before the gates of Lochem and commenced his siege of Lochem. The siege itself lasted five days until the garrison stationed in the city had to surrender. Maurice tried the same with Groenlo, but to no avail.

=== Siege of Groenlo ===
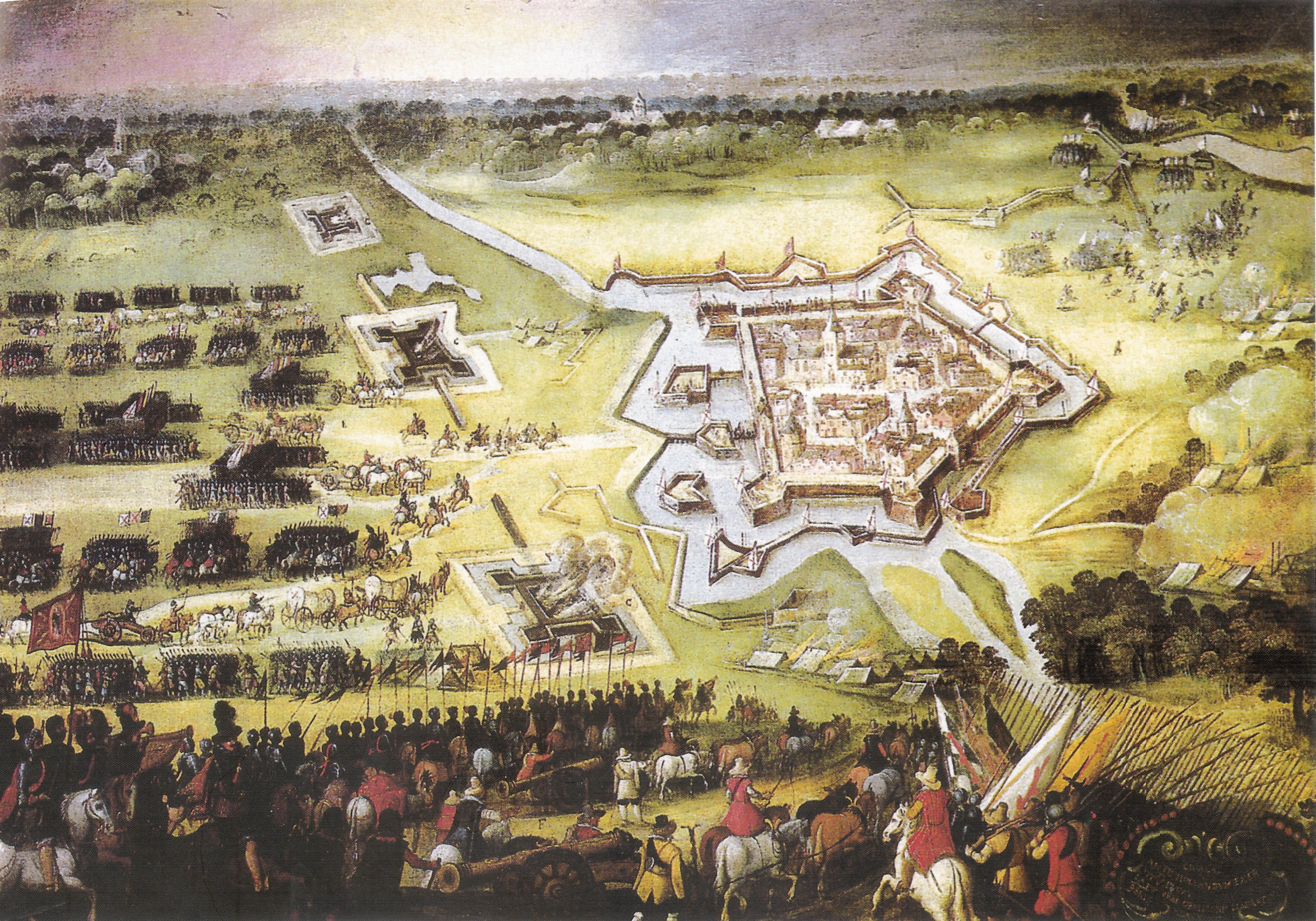
The relief of Groenlo

After Lochem, Spinola was not headed towards Groenlo, and arrived before the city on the 3rd of August. The siege lasted until the 14th of August when the city was forced to surrender. Maurice received the news of this the day after and was told that the garrison of 1.100 men headed towards Zutphen. Spinola headed to Rheinberg afterwards. In October, the Spanish army experienced another mutiny, Maurice viewed this as an opportunity to attempt to recapture Groenlo. Maurice besieged the city on the 30th of October, the Spanish garrison that had a strength of 2,000 put up fierce resistance. Spinola, finally put up with the mutineers, marched towards Groenlo. Upon hearing this, Maurice did not wait for Spinola to arrive, he abandoned the siege and headed to Doesburg.

=== Siege of Rheinberg ===
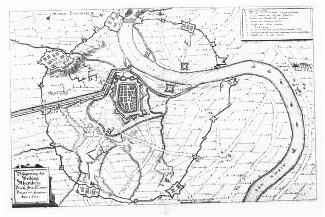
The siege of Rheinberg, 1606

After capturing Groenlo, Spinola urged the Count of Bucquoy to take the strategic city of Rheinberg. On the 24th of August, the Spanish arrived before the city and started to surround it and started to dig trenches. Maurice of Nassau tried his best to relieve the city, but he could not since Spinola's fortifications were too strong. Maurice sent 12,000 of his infantrymen and 3,000 cavalry to encamp near Alphen and sent 2,000 men to Meurs. Maurice also considered to send Frederick Henry to Rheinberg with his cavalry, but decided not to since it was too risky. Maurice would also eventually decide not to relieve the city, since a successful relief meant that the Spanish would most likely retreat towards the Betuwe, and he did not want to risk cities of higher importance in contrast to a city that was located pretty far from the mainland Dutch Republic. Although the Spanish army greatly outnumbered the Dutch garrison, the garrison did show fierce resistance. But the city was forced to surrender on the 1st of October due to starvation. The loss of Oldenzaal, Lingen, Groenlo and now Rheinberg caused the defense of the Eastern Dutch Republic to weaken.

== Aftermath ==
Spinola could no longer continue his campaign due to a shortage of finances. And after the decisive victory at the battle of Gibraltar, the twelve years' truce was agreed upon. After the truce, Spinola captured Jülich during his Palatinate campaign, and captured Steenbergen and Breda after a siege, which would be his most famous victory. However, he failed to capture Bergen op Zoom.

After Maurice's death, his half brother Frederick Henry succeeded him as the Prince of Orange; he recaptured Oldenzaal in 1626, and Groenlo in 1627. Frederick also commenced his siege of 's-Hertogenbosch in 1629.
