= Siege of Lingen (1605) =

Siege during the Eighty Years' War

- Part of Spinola's campaign of 1605–1606 during the Dutch Revolt
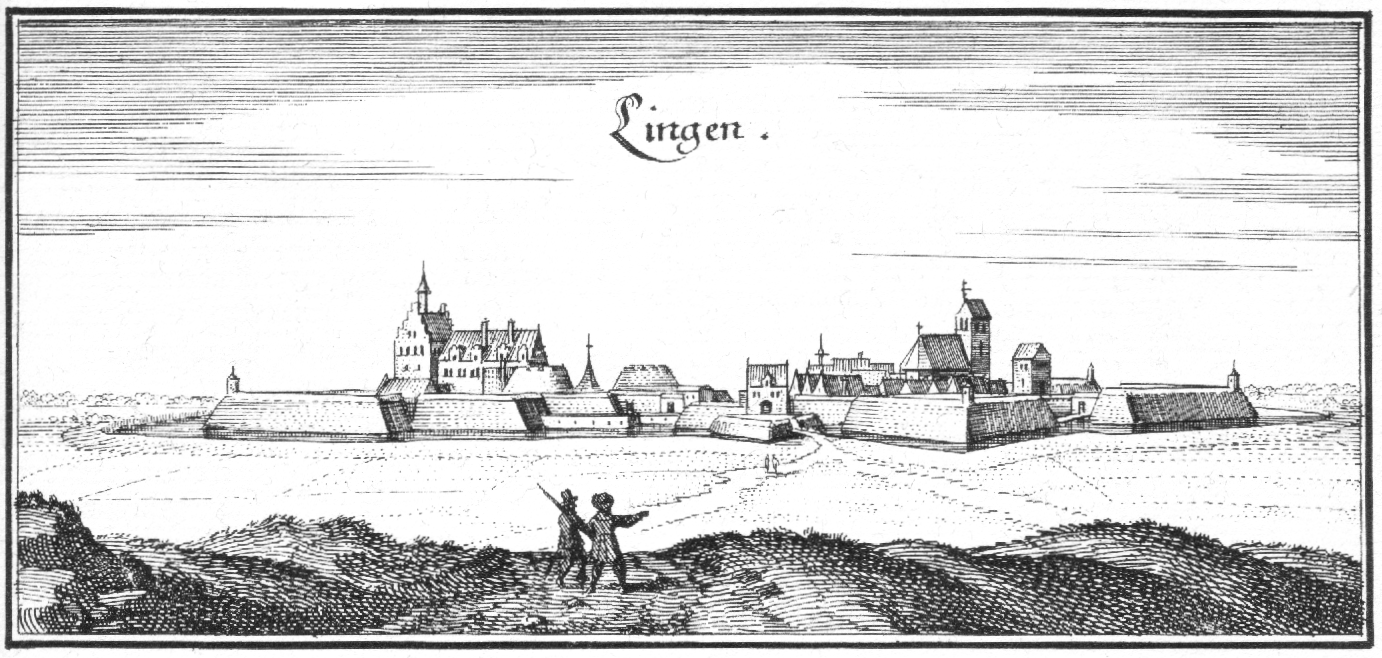
- View of Lingen by Matthäus Merian.
Date	10–19 August 1605
Location	Lingen, Emsland, Lower Saxony (present-day Germany)
Result	Spanish victory

Belligerents
Dutch Republic	Spain

Commanders and leaders
(Dutch Republic) Maerten Cobben	(Spain) Ambrosio Spinola

Strength
Unknown	16,000–17,000

The siege of Lingen of 1605 took place between 10 August and 19 August 1605, at Lingen, District of Emsland, Lower Saxony, between Spain and the United Provinces, during the Eighty Years' War. Prince Maurice of Nassau tried to preserve Lingen at all costs. The Dutch garrison led by Captain Maerten Cobben, expecting to be aided by Maurice's army, held out for nine days, but were finally forced to surrender. The siege was part of Spinola's successful campaign of 1605–1606.

== Background ==
After the devastating siege of Ostend, on 2 July 1605, the Dutch headquarters received reports that Don Ambrosio Spinola with Spain's main army of Flanders was headed towards the strongholds of the Rhine, in Cologne. Maurice and his commanders, who had been secretly planning to lay siege to Antwerp, had to abandon all hope. The movements of Ambrosio Spinola not only prevented the Dutch troops from landing near Antwerp, but also forced the Dutch to abandon their attempt to capture other minor towns. The States-General, alarmed by the Spanish advance, ordered Prince Maurice to head for the Rhine with all of his troops.

Spinola's army was initially estimated between 7,000 or 9,000 infantry and 3,000 cavalry, but a few days later, the new Dutch reports estimated the Spaniards numbered about 16,000–17,000 men. At the end of July, leaving behind 50 infantry companies to guard Ijzendijke, Maurice quickly moved the rest of his army, including 61 infantry companies and 6 cavalry companies, towards Deventer. He arrived there on 10 August. Two days earlier, on 8 August, Spinola reached and laid siege the fortified town of Oldenzaal. The Dutch garrison surrendered to the Spaniards the next day. On the same day, Spinola's army marched on Lingen.

== Siege of Lingen ==
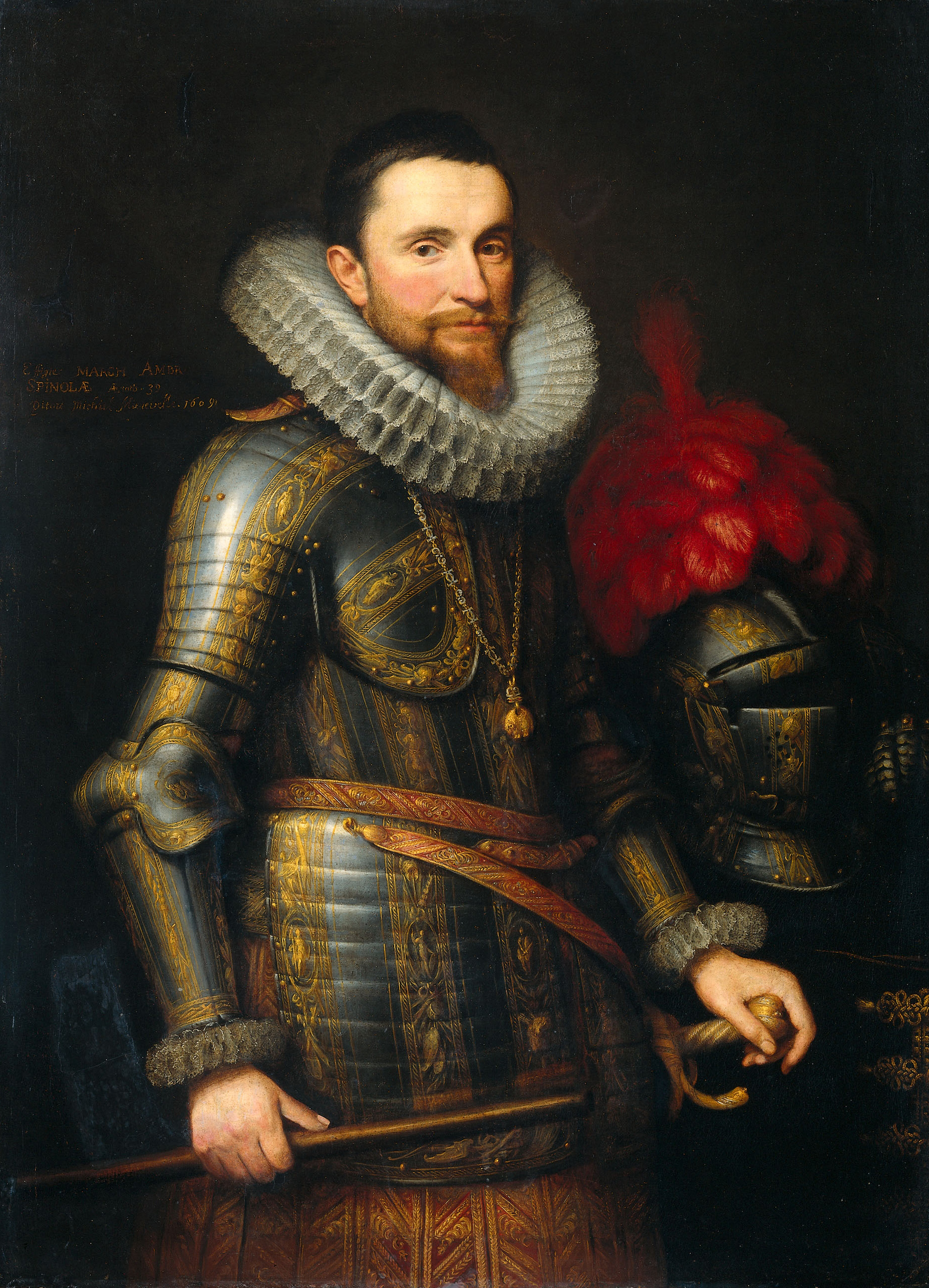
Spanish General Don Ambrosio Spinola by Michiel Jansz. van Mierevelt.

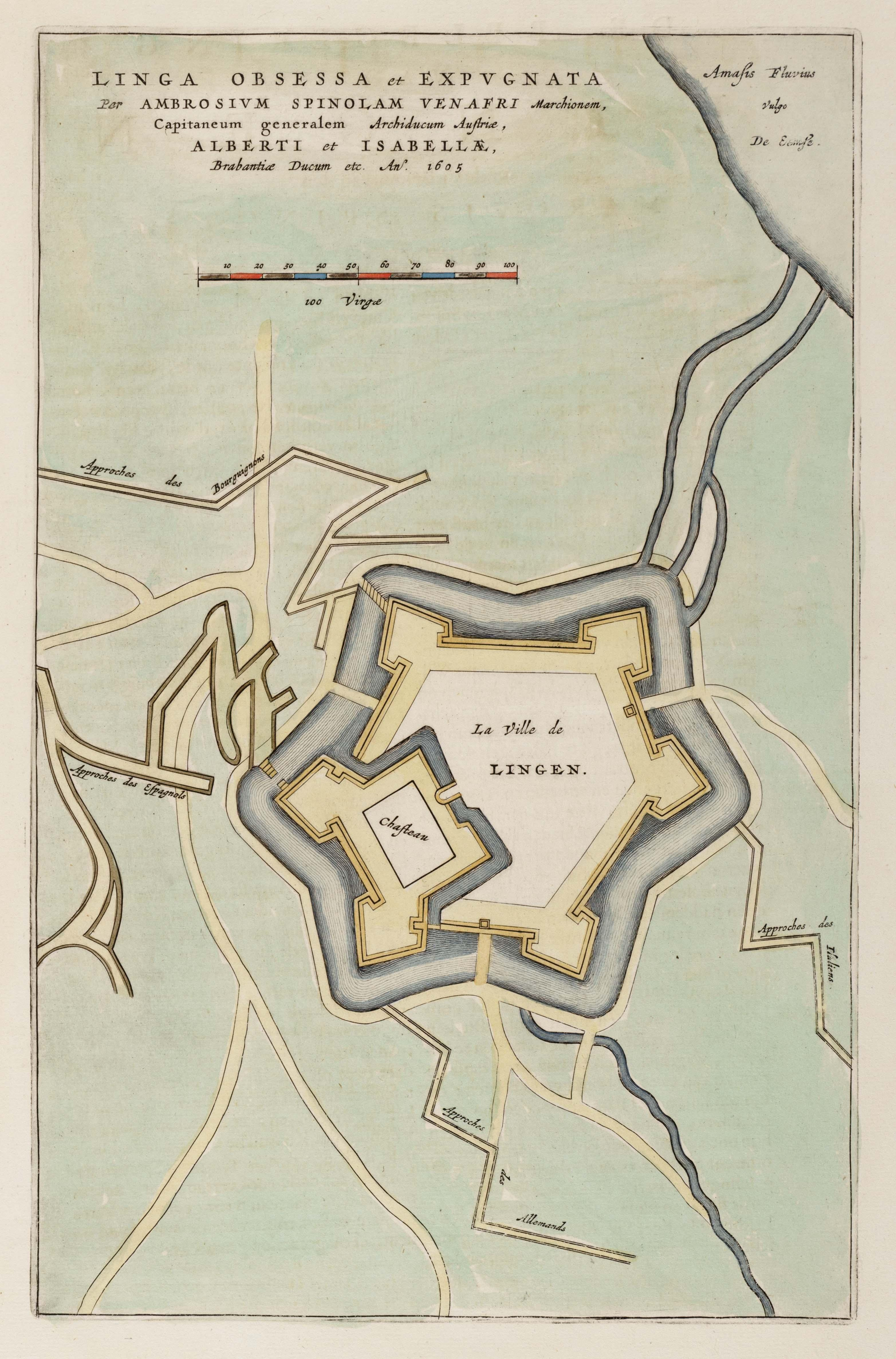
Siege and capture of Lingen in 1605 by Don Ambrosio Spinola.

On 10 August, the Spanish army laid siege to Lingen. The news that Oldenzaal had fallen, and that Spinola was marching on Lingen, reached the Dutch headquarters in the same day.

The fortress-town of Lingen was defended by a garrison of about 500 or 1,000 Dutch soldiers under Captain Maerten Cobben, plus the town militia. Expecting that Prince Maurice would come to their aid, they tried to hold out against the siege for nine days. Spinola in the end the expected relief from Prince Maurice did not arrive in time. Spinola compelled the garrison to surrender, and the town fell on 19 August.

== Aftermath ==
The loss of Lingen led to serious disquiet in the Dutch headquarters, and Prince Maurice had to opt for a defensive strategy. He marched with 12,000 to 13,000 men on 30 August to the towns threatened by Spinola, posting garrisons with total strength of 8,100 men, in Deventer, Zutphen, Zwolle, Rheinberg, Bredevoort, and Groenlo. In mid-September Spinola fell back to the Rhine, crossing the river, took Mülheim an der Ruhr, and laid siege to Wachtendonk on 8 October. On 9 October Dutch troops led by Frederick Henry and Prince Maurice launched an attack against the Spanish troops at Mülheim an der Ruhr, but were repelled and defeated by the Spanish. Wachtendonk fell into Spanish hands on 28 October, and on 8 November, Krakau Castle also was taken by Spinola. Dutch and the Spanish troops then settled into winter quarters in late November ending the season's campaigning.

== See also ==
- Army of Flanders
- Twelve Years' Truce
- Eighty Years' War
- Johan van Oldenbarnevelt
- States-General of the Netherlands
