= Nicolaas Schmelzing =

Austrian nobleman

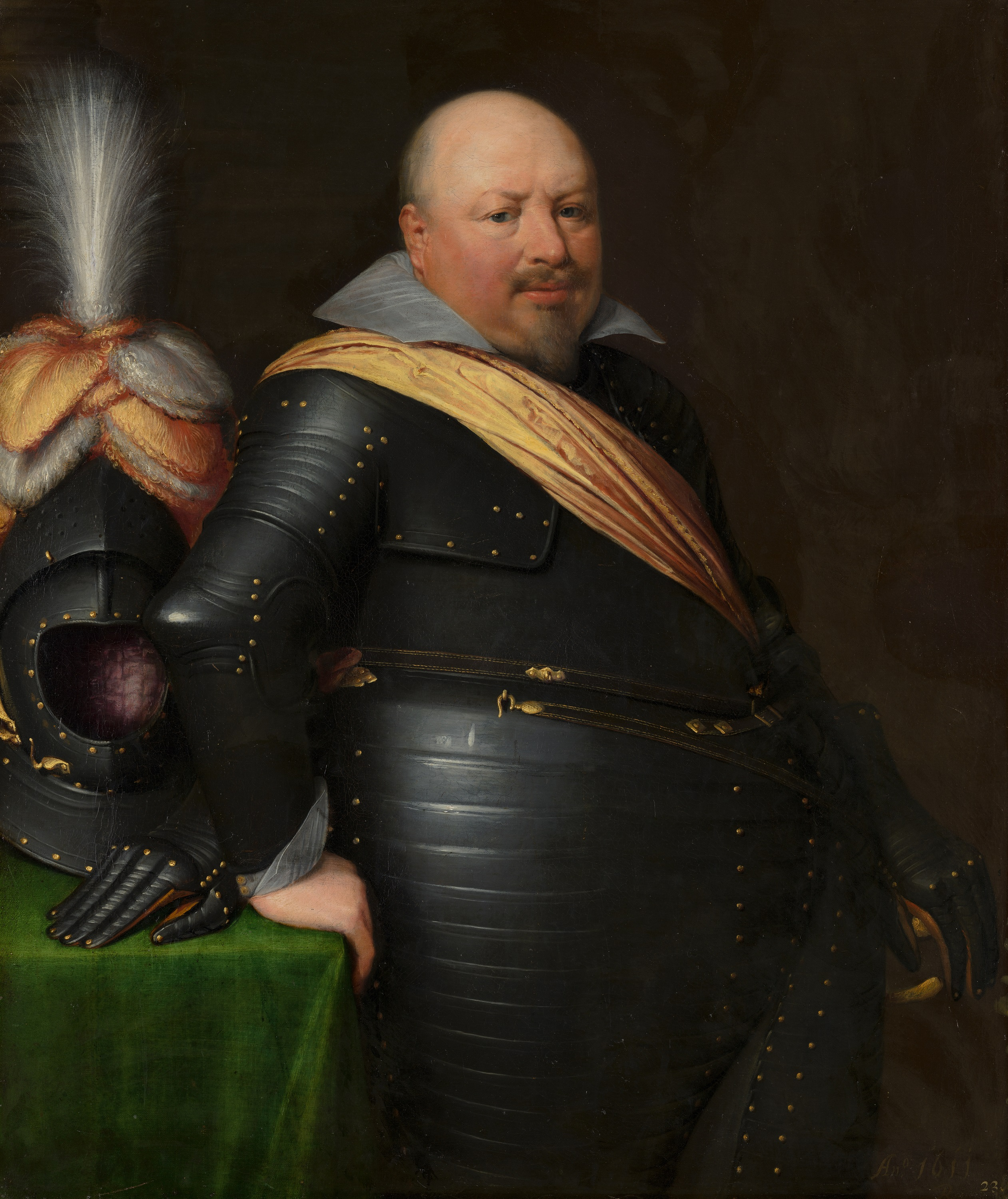
Portrait of Nicolaas Schmelzing by Jan van Ravesteyn and workshop Nationaal Militair Museum MH419

Nicolaas Schmelzing (1561 – 8 September 1629) was an Austrian nobleman, Dutch courtier and military commander, lieutenant-governor of the Province of Overijssel during the early 17th century, and President of the Dutch War Council at the successful Siege of 's-Hertogenbosch in the Eighty-Years War, during which he was killed.

== Life ==
Nicolaas Schmelzing was born in 1561 at Castle Zwickledt in Wernstein, Austria, as Niklas von Schmelzing, into a family which was raised to the hereditary nobility by Emperor Maximilian II in 1567 for previous services in the Italian Wars.

He emigrated in the early 1590s to the Dutch Provinces for religious reasons, and entered the service of the Duke of Nassau. In 1593 he was raised to the position of Rittmeister upon recommendations of the Duke and Maurice of Nassau, and participated in the subsequent cavalry battle at Lippe. In 1616, he was elevated to be Lieutenant-Governor of the province of Overijssel to act as Maurice's deputy, and command all its garrisons. In his memoires, the Prince of Orange later credited Schmelzing for his timely intervention at the Siege of Bergen-op-Zoom, and for the imprisonment of 1,200 Spanish forces under the command of Ambrogio Spinola near the town of Ommen.

Frequenting regularly at Court in The Hague in his later years, he became a close acquaintance of the exiled Elizabeth Queen of Bohemia, and also befriended Constantijn Huygens. The latter dedicated a poem in 1628 to Schmelzing and Elizabeth.

Schmelzing died on 8 September 1629 during the Siege at 's-Hertogenbosch, having been elected President of the executive War Council in 1625. He was given a stately funeral in Heusden. His nephew Wolf Friedrich Schmelzing, who had moved from Austria to serve in the Dutch forces, and who reached the rank of Lieutenant by 1625, inherited his estates and art collections. He later relocated to Upper Austria, with his descendants and other family members continuing to serve in Austrian and later Prussian military positions into the 20th century.
