= Siege of Groenlo (1606) =

1606 siege

Coordinates: 52°3′N 6°37′E

- Part of Spinola's campaign of 1605–1606 during the Dutch Revolt
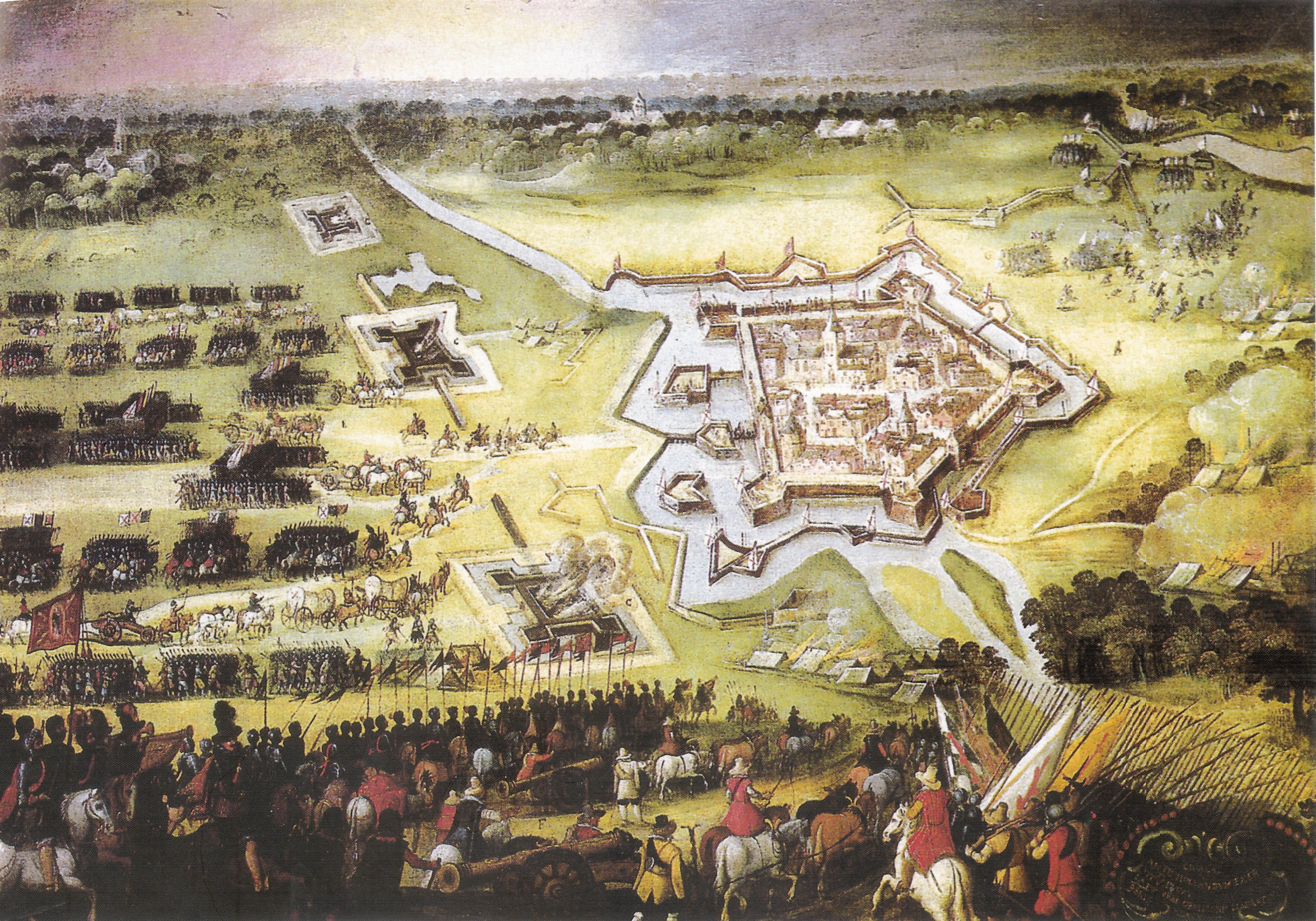
- Groenlo relieved by Spinola, November 1606. Maurice's army (right) sounds the retreat. (In a painting commissioned from Peeter Snayers by Spinola).
Date	3–14 August 1606 (Spinola); 30 October – 9 November 1606 (Maurice)
Location	Groenlo, Gelderland (present-day the Netherlands)
Result	1st Siege: Spanish victory 2nd Siege: Spanish victory

Belligerents
Spain	Dutch Republic

Commanders and leaders
(Spain) Ambrosio Spinola	(Dutch Republic) Maurice of Nassau (Dutch Republic) Diederik van Dort

Strength
15,000	1,300–1,400

The siege of Groenlo was a siege of Groenlo or Grol in 1606 during the Dutch Revolt. It lasted from 3 to 14 August 1606 and ended in the city being captured from the Dutch Republic by a Spanish Empire force under Ambrosio Spinola. A few months later Prince Maurice attempted to retake the city but failed due to poor planning and an intervention by Spinola. Groenlo would remain in Spanish hands until another siege in 1627.

== See also ==
- Íñigo de Borja, leader of the Antwerp garrison.

== Bibliography ==
- Charles John Ann Hereford (1793). The History of Spain: From the Establishment of the Colony of Gades by the Phœnicians, to the Death of Ferdinand, Surnamed the Sage. London: C. and G. Kearsley.
