= Siege of Oldenzaal (1626) =

1626 siege during the Eighty Years' War and the Anglo–Spanish War

- Part of the Eighty Years' War and the Anglo–Spanish War
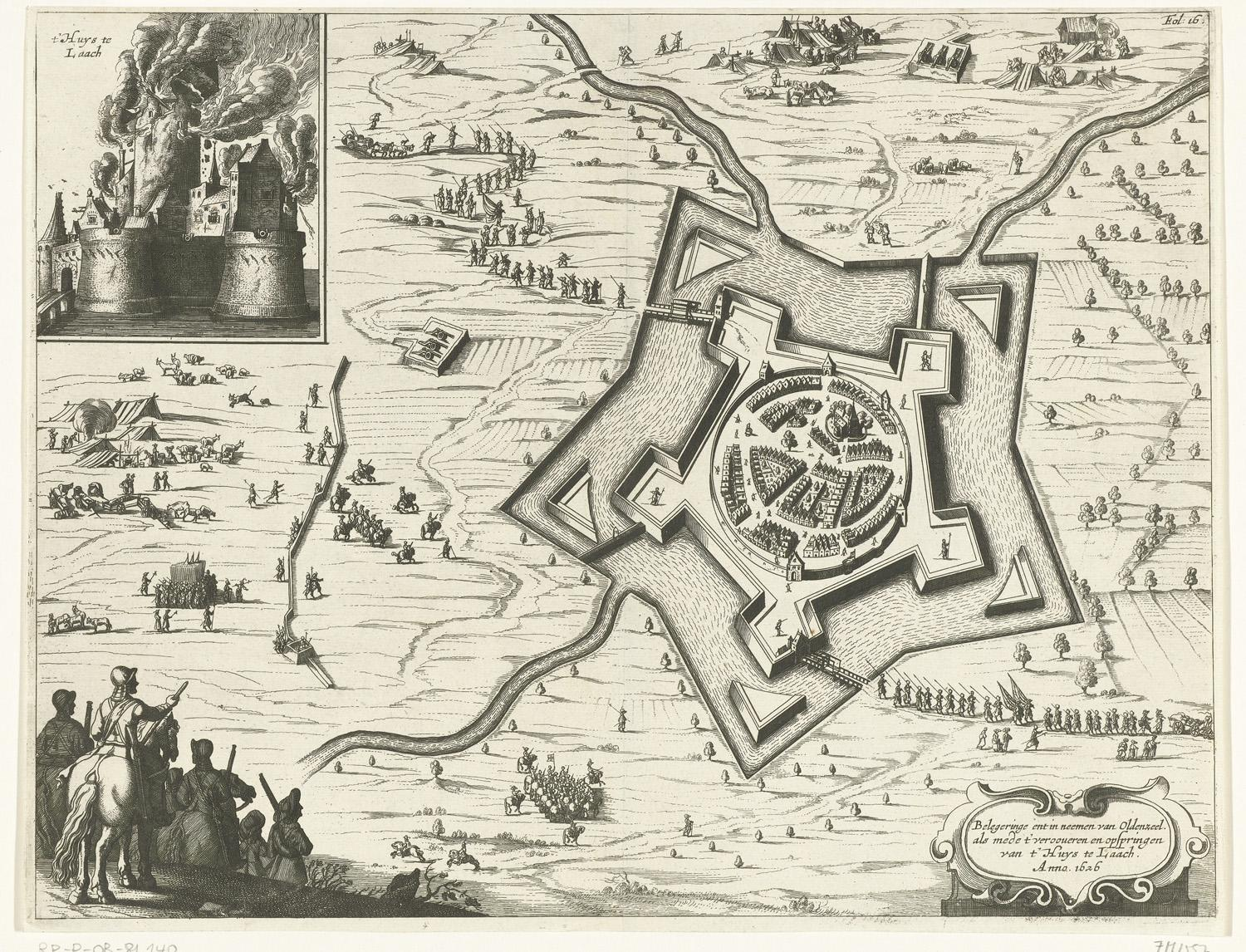
- Capture of Oldenzaal 1626
Date	July 25 to August 1, 1626
Location	Oldenzaal, Overijssel (present-day the Netherlands) 52°18′45″N 6°55′45″E
Result	Anglo-Dutch victory

Belligerents
Dutch Republic; England	Spain

Commanders and leaders
(Dutch Republic) Ernest Casimir (Dutch Republic) Frederick Henry	(Spain) Guillermo Verdugo

Strength
7,000 infantry and cavalry	800

Casualties and losses
Unknown	All captured
- Location within Netherlands Siege of Oldenzaal (1626) (North Sea)

The siege of Oldenzaal took place in the Spanish held town of Oldenzaal in the Twente region from July 23 to August 1, 1626, during the Eighty Years' War and the Anglo–Spanish War. After an eight-day siege led by Ernest Casimir the city surrendered.

== Events ==
=== Background ===
Ambrogio Spinola had captured Oldenzaal in 1605 and Groenlo a year later – with this the region was under Spanish occupation and they undertook raids. In May 1626, the Dutch decided to eliminate the Spanish from the area once and for all. They brought two armies under the command of Frederick Henry, Prince of Orange and with them a detachment of the English army which had been raised as result of their war with Spain. Oldenzaal's garrison which had been continuously strengthened since it capture and twenty years later the city had around 800 troops along with cannon under the command of Spanish Governor Guillermo Verdugo.

=== Siege ===
On July 23 the Dutch and English besieged the town and had a good view of the surrounding environment; as a result, Casimir did not find it necessary to construct a circumvallation line against a possible Spanish relief attempt. Casimir with skilled pioneers dug siege lines with trenches, and batteries were put into position. A few companies of English were detached against Broeckhuise castle on the outskirts which posed a threat but it was captured within two days. It was subsequently plundered and burnt by Dutch troops.

The canals of Oldenzaal were controlled by two sluice gates. Casimir ordered his batteries to fire on the gates which eventually collapsed and the water from the canals was drained. The besieged were now cut off and having realized there was no hope of a relief, Verdugo asked the Anglo-Dutch for terms. After a mere ten day bombardment there was an honourable end to the siege; Verdugo surrendered the city and marched out under the honours of war.

=== Aftermath ===
Casimir made a triumphant entry into the city – Protestants defectors were soon arrested. Oldenzaal was a strategic place for the republic and the fortress walls despite the protests of the city burghers were demolished. However, parts of the old medieval remained, the city wall and parts of the canals were maintained in order to defend against mutinous troops. The following year Groenlo was taken in a two-month siege.
