= Ambrogio Spinola =

Italian-Spanish nobleman and general (1569–1630)

The Most Excellent Ambrogio Spinola 1st Duke of Sesto 1st Marquess of Los Balbases GE
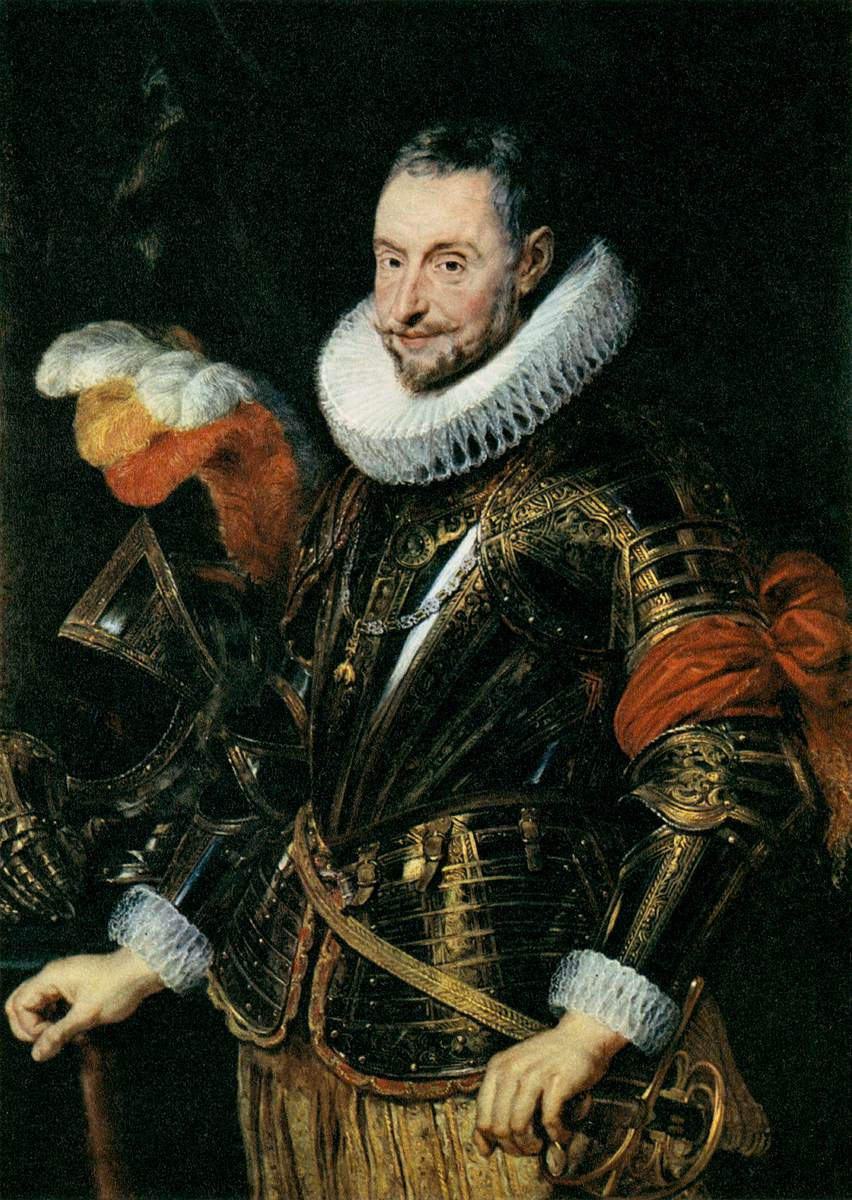
- Portrait by Peter Paul Rubens (1627)

Governor of the Duchy of Milan
- In office 16 June 1629 – 25 September 1630
- Monarch: Philip IV
- Valido: Count-Duke of Olivares
- Preceded by: Gonzalo Fernandez de Córdoba
- Succeeded by: Álvaro de Bazán

Personal details
- Born: 1569 Genoa, Republic of Genoa
- Died: 25 September 1630 (aged 60–61) Castelnuovo Scrivia, Duchy of Mantua

Military service
- Allegiance: Spain
- Branch/service: Spanish Army: Army of Flanders; Army of Italy
- Rank: Captain-General
- Commands: Maestre de campo general of the Army of Flanders (1605); Captain-General of the Army of Flanders (1620); Captain-General of the Flanders Armada (1624); Commander of the Army of Italy (1629)
- Battles/wars: See battles: Eighty Years' War; Siege of Ostend; Siege of Sluis (1604); Spinola's campaign of 1605–1606; Capture of Oldenzaal (1605); Siege of Lingen (1605); Battle of Mülheim; Siege of Lochem (1605); Siege of Groenlo (1606); Siege of Rheinberg (1606); Siege of Jülich (1621–1622); Siege of Bergen-op-Zoom (1622); Siege of Breda (1624); War of the Jülich Succession; Siege of Aachen (1614); Siege of Wesel (1614); Thirty Years' War; Palatinate campaign; Capture of Oppenheim; War of the Mantuan Succession; Siege of Casale (1630)

Ambrogio Spinola, 1st Marquess of Los Balbases and 1st Duke of Sesto (1569 – 25 September 1630) was an Italian nobleman and military leader from the Republic of Genoa in the service of the Spanish Empire. He distinguished himself in several key engagements during the Eighty Years' War and the Thirty Years' War, and is regarded as one of the greatest military commanders of his time and in the history of the Spanish army.

Born into a prominent family in the Republic of Genoa, Spinola entered Spanish service in 1602, raised 9,000 men at his own expense and conducted a successful siege at Ostend. His early victories led to his appointment as commander-in-chief in Flanders by King Philip II. Demonstrating his mastery of siege warfare, he led a one-year campaign that resulted in the capture of a string of cities along the Rhine from Maurice of Nassau, but also brought about his own financial ruin.

Early in the Thirty Years' War, Spinola conducted the Palatinate campaign. Following the end of the Twelve Years' Truce in the Low Countries, Spinola achieved the most famous victory of his career by capturing Breda in 1624. Political intrigues, in particular his rivalry with the royal favourite Olivares, hindered his military efforts, and he left Flanders in 1628. Spinola died in 1630 while conducting the siege of Casale during the War of the Mantuan Succession.

== Early life ==
Heir to a prominent branch of his family, Ambrogio Spinola was born in Genoa, the eldest son of Filippo Spinola, Marquis of Sesto and Venafro, one of the wealthiest members of the Genoese nobility, and his wife Polissena Grimaldi, daughter of Nicolò prince of Salerno. The family of Spinola was of great antiquity, wealth and power in Genoa. Don Ambrogio's sister Donna Lelia was married to Don Giulio Cesare Squarciafico, 2nd Marquess of Galatone, from whom descend the Princes of Belmonte.

In the 16th century, the Italian Republic of Genoa was in practical terms a protected state of the Spanish Empire; the Genoese were the bankers of the Spanish monarchy and had control of its finances. Several of the younger brothers of Ambrogio Spinola sought their fortune in Spain, and one of them, Federico, distinguished himself greatly as a soldier in the Army of Flanders.

As the eldest brother, Ambrogio remained at home to marry and continue the family. In 1592 he was married to Giovanna Bacciadonne, daughter of the count of Galerata.

In 1597, Ambrogio was elected representative of the villa owners of Cornigliano, where he owned a palace. In 1600 he was involved in the construction of a galley to be built on the beach at Cornigliano or Sampierdarena.

== Spanish service ==
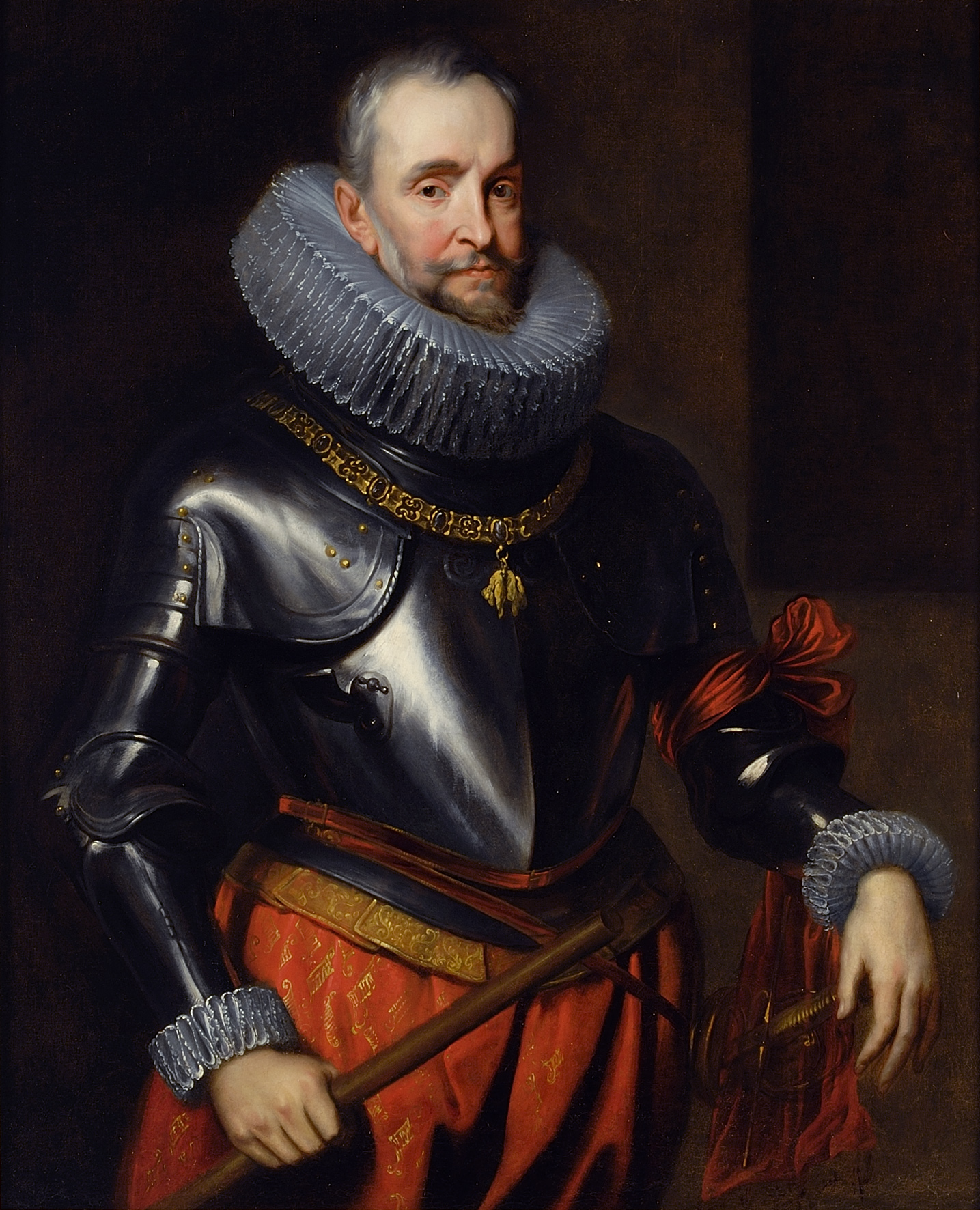
Portrait of Ambrogio Spinola by Anthony van Dyck

The houses of Spinola and Doria were rivals for authority within the republic. Ambrogio Spinola continued the rivalry with Giovanni Andrea Doria, count of Tursi, then the chief of the Dorias. He was not successful, and having lost a lawsuit into which he had entered to enforce a right of pre-emption of an important palace built by his grandfather Niccolò Grimaldi, prince of Salerno, which the Doria wished to purchase, he decided to withdraw from the city and advance the fortunes of his house by serving the Spanish monarchy in Flanders.

In 1602 he and his brother Federico entered into a contract with the Spanish government—a condotta on the old Italian model. It was a speculation on which Spinola risked the whole of the great fortune of his house. Ambrogio Spinola undertook to raise 9,000 Lombard mercenaries for land service, and Federico to form a squadron of galley ships for service on the coast.

Several of Federico's galleys were destroyed by English and Dutch war-ships; first at Sesimbra in June and then at the Goodwin Sands in October in the English Channel. He himself was slain in an action with the Dutch on 24 May 1603.

Ambrogio Spinola marched overland to Flanders in 1602 with the men he had raised at his own expense. During the first months of his stay in Flanders, the Spanish government played with schemes for employing him on an invasion of England, which came to nothing. At the close of the year, he returned to Italy for more men.

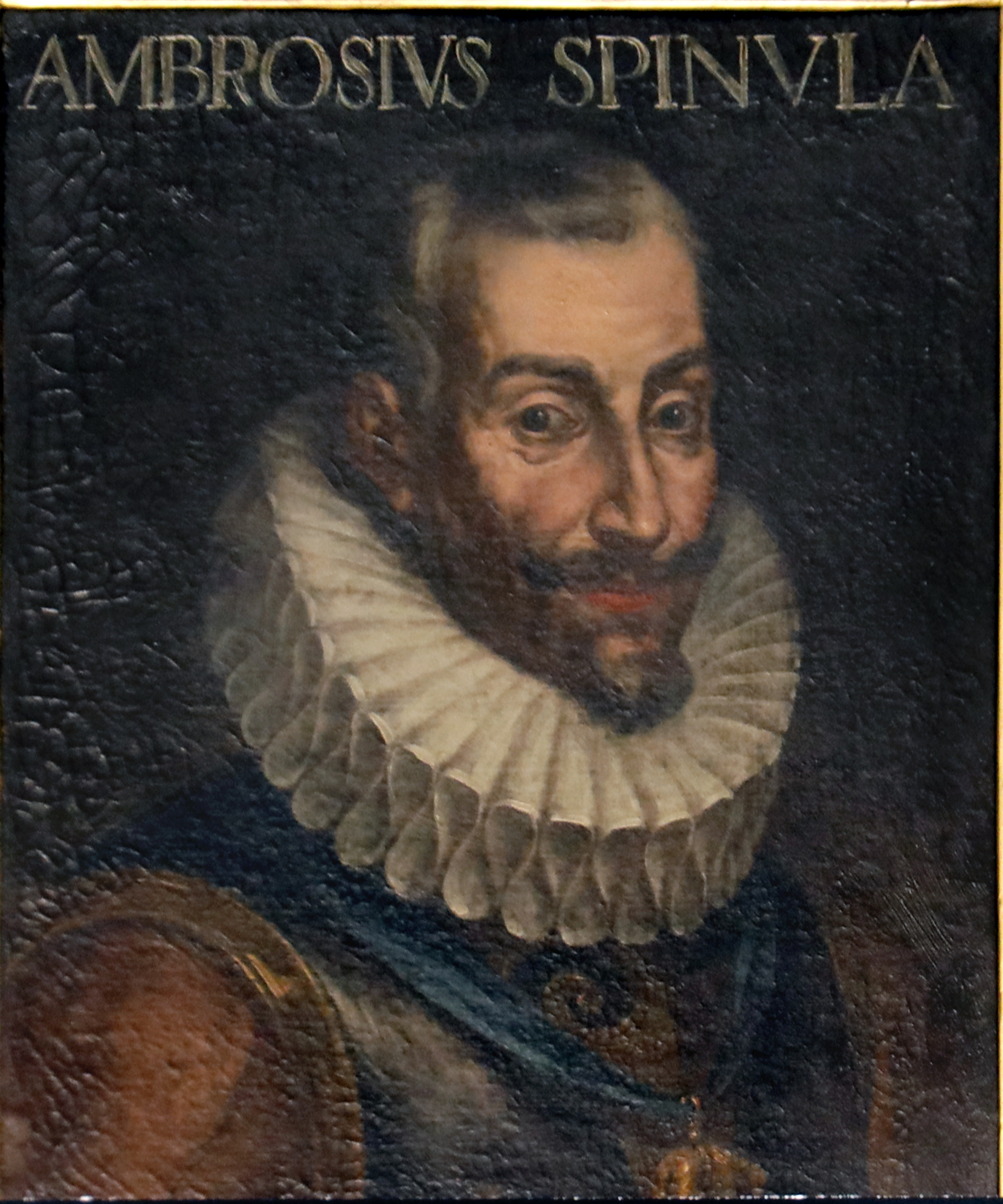
Ambrogio Spinola, Painted before 1630 in Florence, Galleria degli Uffizi.

His experience as a soldier did not begin until, as General, and at the age of thirty-four, he undertook to continue the Siege of Ostend on 29 September 1603. Despite failing to relieve Sluis under siege at the same time, the ruins of Ostend fell into his hands on 22 September 1604. For this victory, he was appointed a Knight of the Order of the Golden Fleece in 1605.

== War in Flanders ==
The rulers of Flanders, Archduke Albert and the Infanta Isabella, who had set their hearts on taking Ostend, were delighted at Spinola's success, and it won him a high reputation among the soldiers of the time. At the close of the campaign, he went to Spain to meet with the court, then in Valladolid, and make arrangements for the continuation of the war. At Valladolid, he insisted on being appointed commander-in-chief in Flanders.

By April, he had returned to Brussels to lead his first military campaign. At this period, the wars of the Low Countries consisted almost entirely of sieges, and Spinola made himself famous by the number of places he took in spite of the efforts of Maurice of Nassau to defend them, including heavily fortified Groenlo. His efforts would mark a turning point in the war with his campaign resulting in capturing Oldenzaal, Lingen, Wachtendonk, Groenlo and Rheinberg for the Archdukes.

In 1606 he again went to Spain. He was received with much outward honour, and entrusted with a very secret mission to secure the government of Flanders in case of the death of the Archduke or his wife. However, he could not obtain the grandeeship which he desired and was compelled to pledge his entire fortune as security for the expenses of the war before the bankers would advance funds to the Spanish government. He was never repaid, resulting in his complete financial ruin.

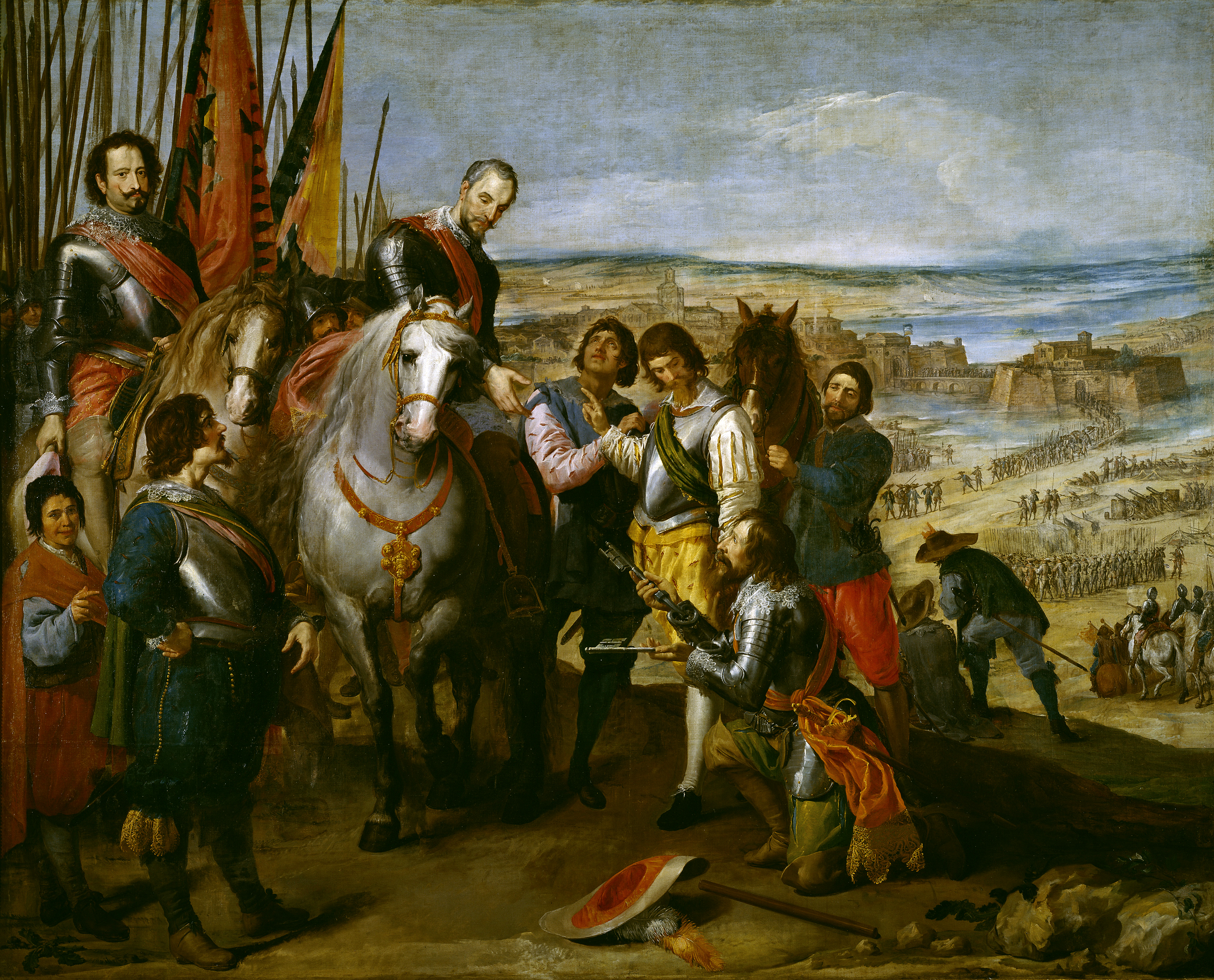
Ambrogio on horseback at the Siege of Julich

The Spanish government now had a reason to keep him away from Spain. Until the signing of the Twelve Years' Truce in 1609, he continued to command in the field with general success. After it was signed he retained his post, and had among other duties to conduct the negotiations with France when Henry II de Bourbon, Prince de Condé fled to Flanders with his wife, Charlotte-Marguerite de Montmorency, in order to put her beyond the reach of the admiration of the older Henry IV of France. By 1611 Spinola's financial ruin was complete, but he was given the aristocratic title, a Grandeza, which he had sought. In 1614 he was involved with operations connected with the settlement of the War of the Jülich Succession, which awarded Cleves to George William, Elector of Brandenburg and Jülich to Wolfgang Wilhelm, Count Palatine of Neuburg. From 1620 to 1622, in the Thirty Years' War, he led the Palatinate campaign in the Lower Palatinate, which included the capture of many towns and villages, including Drais, and was rewarded with the rank of Captain-General.

After the renewal of the war in the Low Countries in 1621 he had the worst setback of his career in the Siege of Bergen op Zoom (1622), followed by his most renowned victory, the capture of Breda. Success came after a long siege (28 August 1624 – 5 June 1625), in spite of the objections of Philip IV of Spain, who thought the siege was too risky and expensive, and the strenuous efforts of Maurice of Nassau, Prince of Orange, to save the town. The surrender of Breda is the subject of a famous painting by Velázquez, known as Las Lanzas.

=== Capture of Breda ===
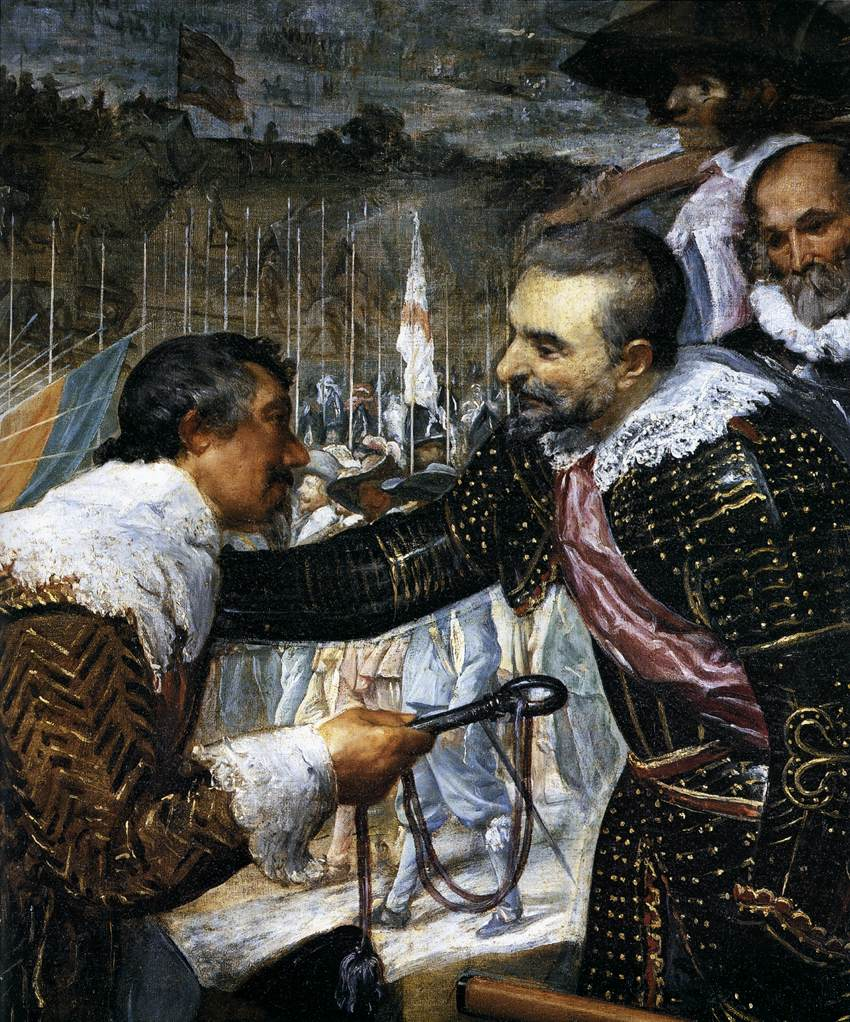
Diego Velázquez - The Surrender of Breda (1634–1635), Spinola is pictured on the right.

Spinola captured the city after a prolonged siege. After its surrender, he gave safe passage to the officers and soldiers of the Dutch garrison, who were allowed to leave the city with their banners and arms, a magnanimous gesture that made Spinola famous throughout Europe. Spinola famously argued, El valor del vencido es la gloria del vencedor ("The valour of the defeated is the glory of the victor"). The gesture, which was understood as true Christian benevolence, is depicted in Velázquez's work.

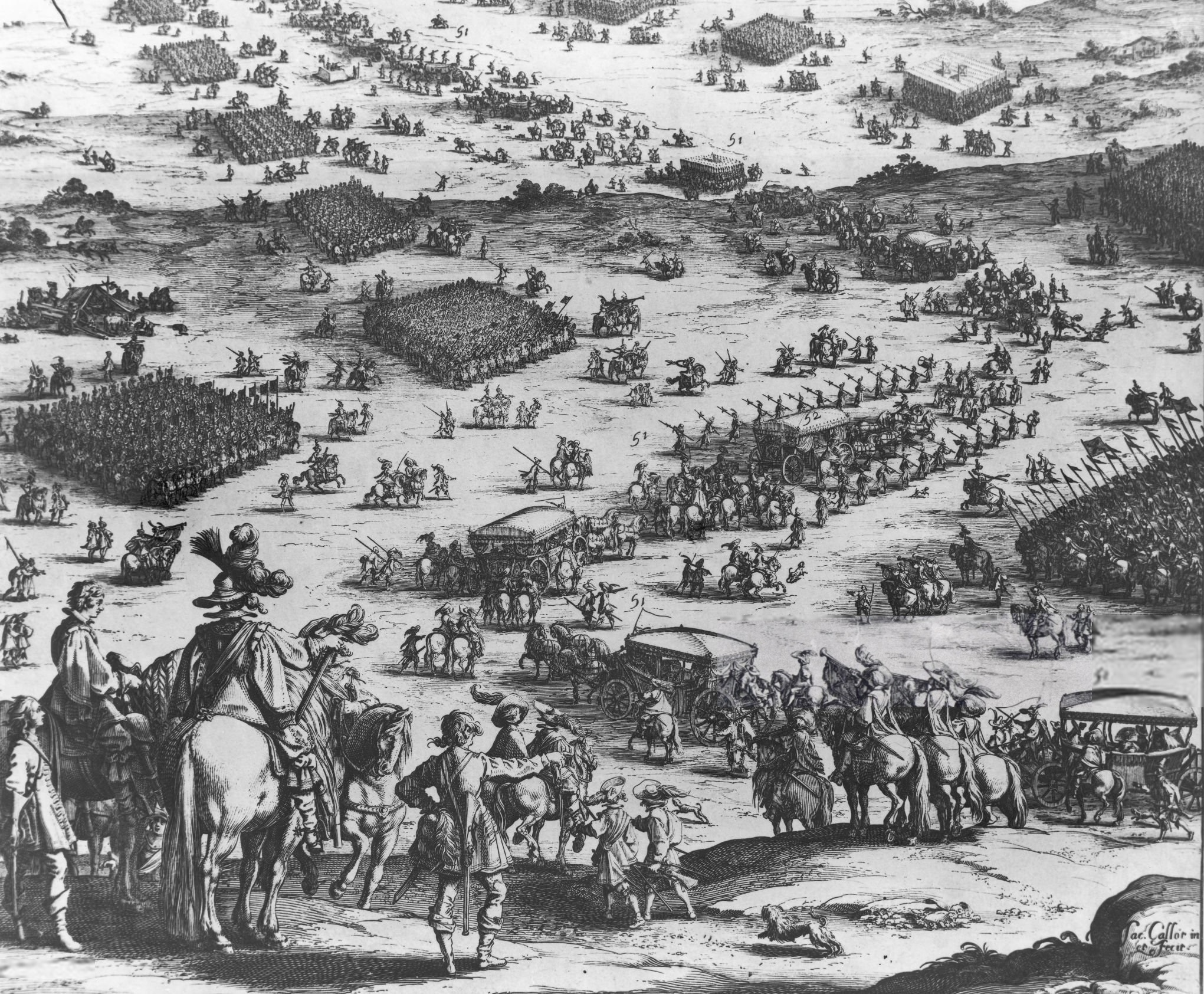
The Siege of Breda.

The taking of Breda was the culmination of Spinola's career. Utter want of money paralysed the Spanish government, and the new favourite, Olivares, was jealous of the general. Spinola could not prevent Ernest Casimir of Nassau from taking Oldenzaal in 1626, or Frederick Henry of Nassau from taking Groenlo (or Grol) in 1627.

In January 1628 Spinola left for Spain, resolved not to resume the command in Flanders unless security was given to him for the support of his army. At Madrid he had to endure much insolence from Olivares, who endeavoured to make him responsible for the loss of Groenlo. Spinola resolved not to return to Flanders.

== Death ==
Meanwhile, the Spanish government added a war over the succession to the Duchy of Mantua to its heavy burdens. Spinola was appointed as plenipotentiary and general. He landed at Genoa on 19 September 1629. With him, at the suggestion of painter Peter Paul Rubens, came the Spanish royal painter Diego Velázquez, who went with him to see famous paintings in Genoa, Milan, Venice and Rome.

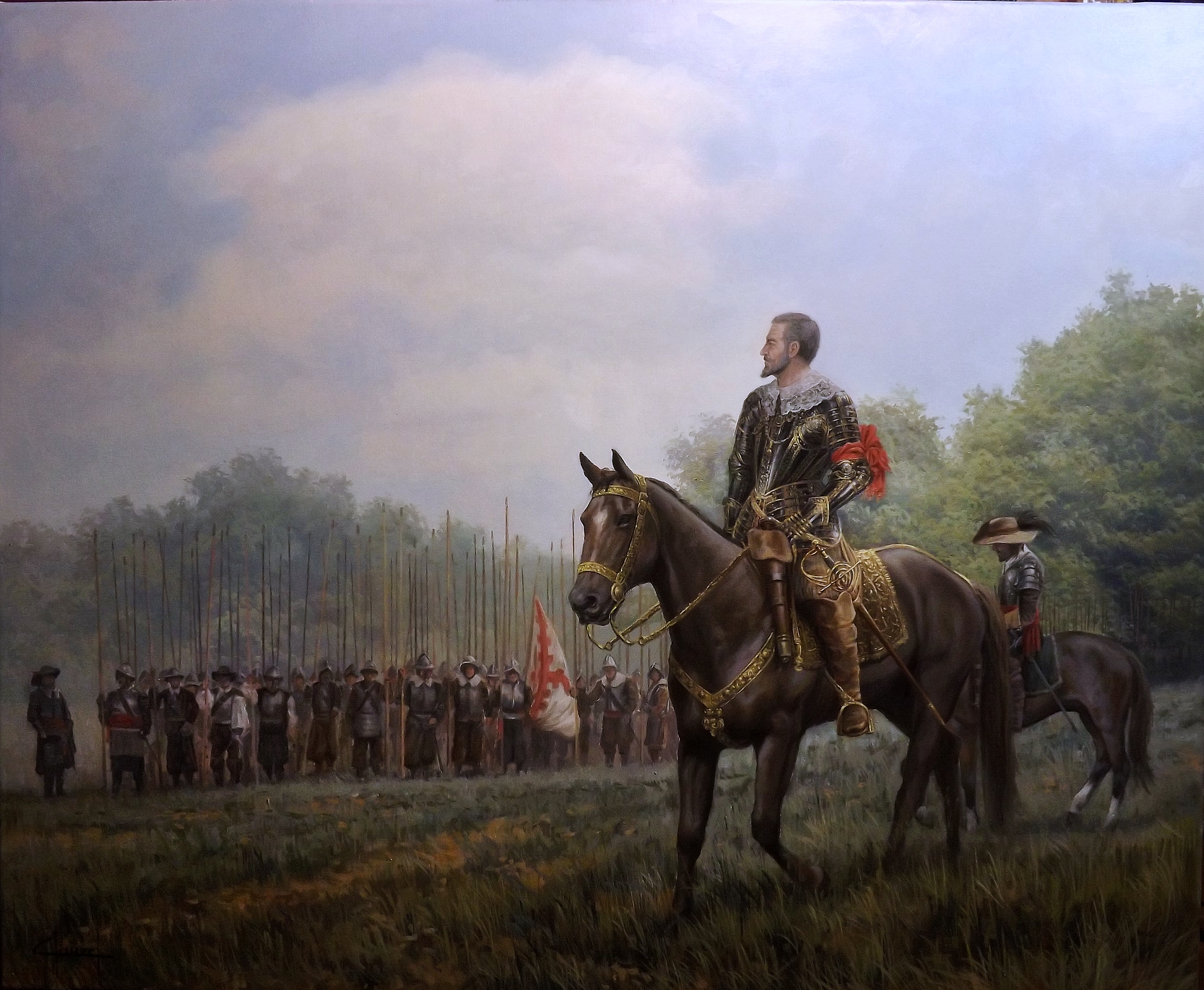
Painting of Spinola leading his troops. Jose Ferre Clauzel (2016)

Flag of a Tercio of Spinola in 1621.

In Italy, he was pursued by the enmity of the Conde-Duque of Olivares, who had been born in Rome in 1587, where his father, don Enrique de Guzmán y Ribera, a cadet child from one of Spain's oldest noble families, was the Spanish ambassador. Olivares ultimately caused Spinola to be deprived of his powers as plenipotentiary. Spinola's health broke down, as he was already 61 years old, with over 30 years' experience on the battlefield. He died on 25 September 1630 at the Siege of Casale, muttering, apparently, the words "honour" and "reputation." The title of "Marquess of Los Balbases", still borne by his representatives in Spain, was all that his family received for the vast fortune they spent in the service of Philip III and IV. He would be painted however after his death, by Diego Velázquez, in 1635, as ordered by Felipe IV, in The Surrender of Breda.

Spinola was a brilliant field commander, whose daring in battle often was used to outflank his opponents and catch them off guard. He was not a great technical innovator but was a master of military skills. He used rapid movement and pell-mell actions in his battles. He was skilled at picking out an enemy's weakest spot and applying force there to achieve victory.

== Family ==
Spinola and Giovanna Bacciadonne had three children:

- Filippo (1594 – 8 August 1659), 2nd Marquess of Balbases and his successor.
- Polissena (died 1639), married Diego Felipe de Guzmán, 1st Marquess of Leganés, Governor of Flanders.
- Agustin (1597 – 12 February 1649), Bishop of Tortosa 1625, Archbishop of Granada 1627, Archbishop of Santiago de Compostela 1630, Archbishop of Sevilla 1645.

== Sources ==
- Hobbs, Nicolas (2007). "Grandes de España" (in Spanish). Archived from the original on 25 October 2008.
- Instituto de Salazar y Castro. Elenco de Grandezas y Titulos Nobiliarios Españoles (in Spanish). periodic publication.
- Rodriguez Villa, A. (1905). Ambrosio Spinola, primer marqués de Los Balbases (in Spanish). Madrid, Spain.
- Genealogía de la familia y del apellido Spinola (in Spanish)..

Government offices
Preceded by Gonzalo; Fernández de Córdoba	Governor of the Duchy of Milan; 1629–1630	Succeeded by Álvaro de Bazán
Italian nobility
New title	Duke of Sesto; 1612–1630	Succeeded by Filippo Spínola
Spanish nobility
New title	Marquess of Los Balbases; 1621–1630	Succeeded by Filippo Spínola
