= Siege of Bergen op Zoom (1622) =

Battle between Dutch and Spanish in 1622

- Part of the Eighty Years' War
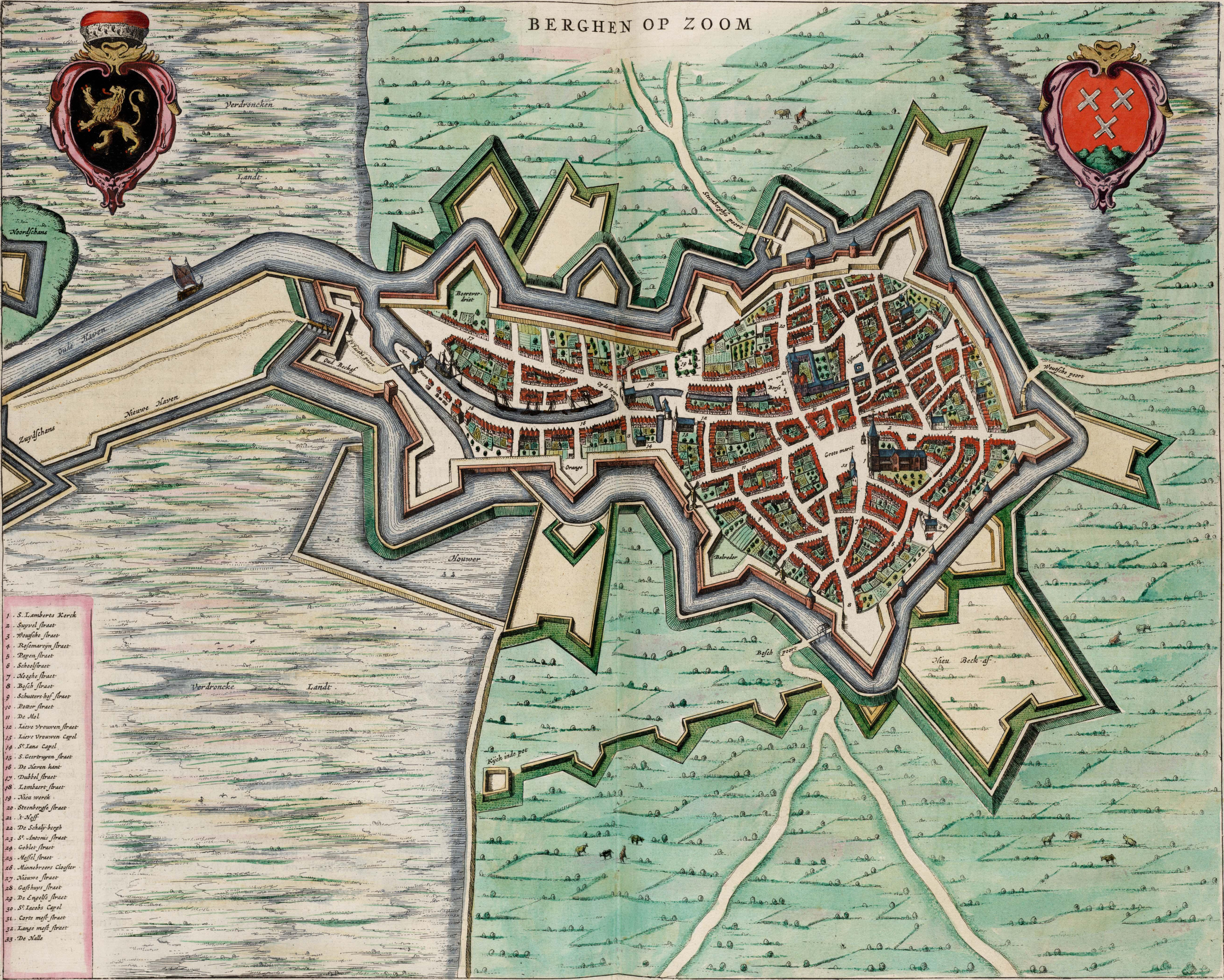
- Bergen op Zoom, c. 1620
Date	8 July 1622 – 2 October 1622
Location	Bergen op Zoom (present-day Netherlands) 51°30′N 4°18′E
Result	Dutch victory

Belligerents
Dutch Republic	Spain

Commanders and leaders
(Dutch Republic) Maurice, Prince of Orange (Dutch Republic) Ernst von Mansfeld (Dutch Republic) Sir Robert Henderson † (Dutch Republic) Christian the Younger (Dutch Republic) Nicolaas Schmelzing	(Spain) Ambrosio Spinola (Spain) Hendrik van den Bergh (Spain) Luis de Velasco

Strength
Unknown	Unknown

Casualties and losses
Unknown	Unknown
- Location within North Brabant Bergen op Zoom (Netherlands)

The siege of Bergen op Zoom (1622) was a siege during the Eighty Years' War that took place from 18 July to 2 October 1622. The Spanish general Ambrosio Spinola laid siege to the Dutch city of Bergen op Zoom.

== Background ==
The Spanish had besieged the city before in the Autumn of 1588. Led by the Alexander Farnese, the Duke of Parma the Spanish failed to take the city which had been composed of Dutch, English and Scots. The population of Bergen op Zoom was divided between Protestants, who favoured resistance and Catholics, who favoured a Spanish conquest.

== Siege ==
Spinola tried a feigned manoeuvre by sending a part of his army under Hendrik van den Bergh to Cleves, and another part under Luis de Velasco to Steenbergen, which was consequently conquered by Velasco.

But the city did not fall because it was supplied by sea. Furthermore, the Dutch Navy regularly bombarded the Spanish, causing many casualties. The young Michiel de Ruyter was one of these gunners.

The Dutch called on the German mercenary armies of Mansfeld and Christian of Brunswick to relieve the city. The Spanish sent their Palatian Army under Córdoba to intercept them, resulting in the Battle of Fleurus, Belgium on 22 August. Although the Germans lost thousands of men there, in the end Córdoba could not hinder their orderly departure towards Bergen.

In September 1622, when Spinola and Velasco seized Steenbergen, they moved to besiege to Bergen op Zoom. Prince Maurice, realising Spain's intentions, detached fourteen companies of English and Scots under Sir Robert Henderson as well as eleven companies of Flemings, Walloons and French to both reinforce and command the garrison in Bergen op Zoom. The English and Scots were allocated the South side of the defence of the town.

On 16 August the English Scots seized high piece of ground near the Antwerp gate and commenced constructing a half moon. The Spanish then attempted to retake this position but were repelled three times; a fourth attempt broke into the trenches but the English and Scots held firm. Henderson seeing the difficulty they were in, according to a chronicler at the battle, then led a massive sally of three or four thousand men from the garrison, with the Scots and English in the vanguard, the Dutch in the middle, and the French in the rear. In the battle, which "lasted a night and a whole morning," Henderson was killed. The chronicler's description of his death rich and colourful:

I will saying nothing, in commendation of Colonel Henderson; his own actions commend him in the highest degree, for he stood all the fight in as great danger as any common soldier, still encouraging, directing, and acting with his Pike in his hand. At length he was shot in the thigh: he received his wound at the front, or, as most say, being over earnest he stepped into his enemy's trenches. So he was nothing but spirit and courage. He shewed it chiefly in his devotion, and in his earnest calling upon God in his sickness, and he was so willing to die that he made but a recreation of it, for after he had received the Sacrament he remembered his friends very cheerfully, and being extremely hot, he asked his physician [for leave] to drink some water; so his Physician, seeing he was but a dead man, let him have his will. He drank five toasts; the first was to the King, the second to the Prince [Charles], the third to the Queen of Bohemia, the fourth to the Prince of Orange, and the last to the Earl of Marre. When he had done he desired his brother to thrust him down into his bed, and so took his leave of this miserable life.

The Spanish, by now led by Velasco, had to lift the siege on 2 October, as a result of the arrival of an army under the Dutch Stadtholder Maurice of Nassau, Prince of Orange and Ernst von Mansfeld.

== Aftermath ==
In his memoirs, the Prince of Orange credits the reinforcements under lieutenant-governor of Overijssel, Nicolaas Schmelzing as decisive, which led to a pursuit and the imprisonment of 1,200 Spanish forces near the town of Ommen. The siege cost Spinola between 5,000 and 10,000 troops.
