= Groenlo =

- City
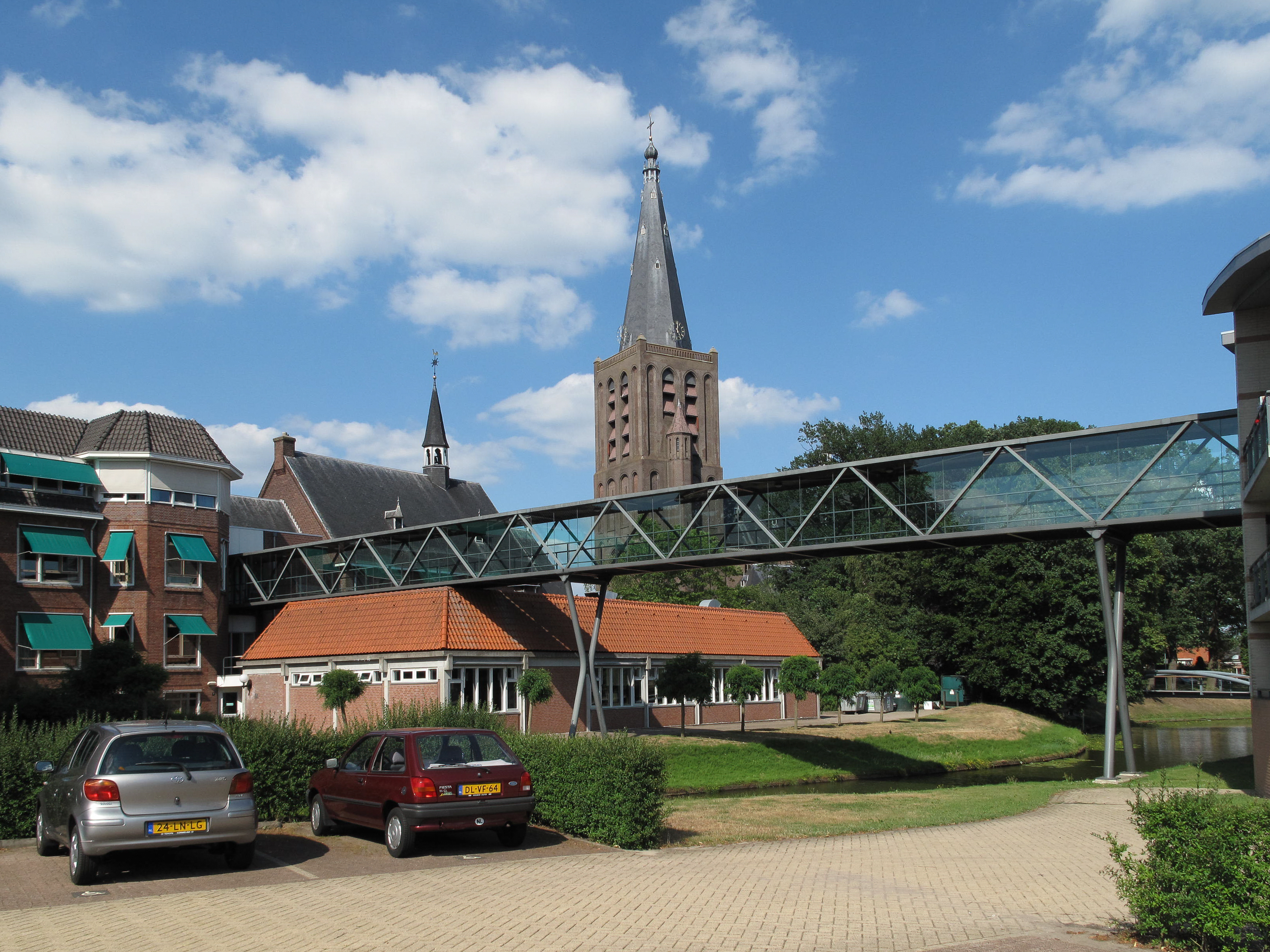
- Two churches of Groenlo

- Flag Coat of arms

- Location in the province of Gelderland in the Netherlands Groenlo (Netherlands)
- Coordinates: 52°2′28″N 6°37′2″E
- Country: Netherlands
- Province: Gelderland
- Municipality: Oost Gelre

Area
  - Total: 27.84 km^{2} (10.75 sq mi)
- Elevation: 25 m (82 ft)

Population (2021)
  - Total: 9,860
  - Density: 354/km^{2} (917/sq mi)
- Time zone: UTC+1 (CET)
  - Summer (DST): UTC+2 (CEST)
- Postal code: 7141
- Dialing code: 0544
- Website: www.groenlo.nl

Groenlo (Dutch pronunciation: [ˈɣrunloː]) is a city in the municipality of Oost Gelre, situated in the eastern part of the Netherlands, on the German border, within a region in the province of Gelderland called the Achterhoek (literally: "back corner"). Groenlo was a municipality until 1 January 2005, when it merged with Lichtenvoorde. Until 19 May 2006 Groenlo was the official name of Oost Gelre. As of 1 January 2006 Groenlo, including its hamlet Zwolle, counted a population of 10,067. Groenlo is known locally and historically as Grolle, Groll or Grol.

Today, Groenlo is known primarily for its beer brewery Grolsch (literal meaning: "from Grol"), which was in business since 1615, but has been closed in 2004 when it moved to Boekelo. Grolsch produces many specialty beers (including beers for each season) and its beer is exported all over the world. Groenlo's military history is less well known today.

== History ==
The old shield of Groenlo

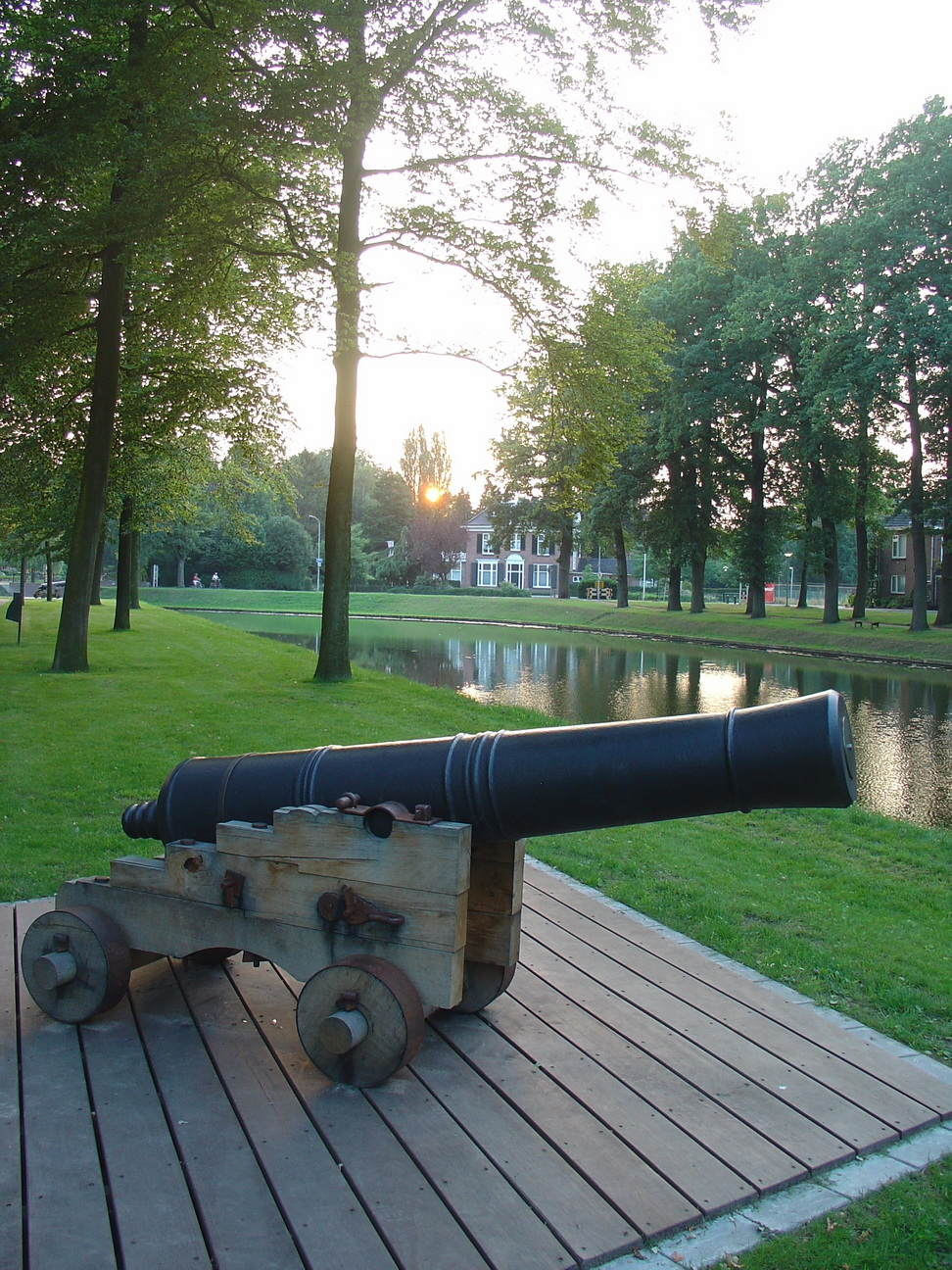
Canons placed alongside the canals in Groenlo.

Groenlo originates from the beginning of the 7th century. The name Groenlo refers to a green wood that lay in the neighbourhood (groen means "green", lo means "forest"), hence the old shield of Groenlo, a green tree. Groenlo became a Guelders enclave of Borculo. On 2 December 1277, it received city rights from landgrave Reinoud I of Zutphen. There were six councilors, four of which were aldermen and two mayors. The judicial archive of Groenlo is very incomplete.

Since 1406, Groenlo has been part of the bishopric of Münster. The city was an important trade center along the German–Dutch trade route, which resulted in a rich variety of guilds. It became a strong stronghold during the 16th and 17th century. The stronghold was repeatedly besieged during the Eighty Years' War. The city still has a defensively shaped Gracht (canal) and (the remains of) bulwarks stemming from this era.

In 1597 the city was conquered by Maurice of Nassau. In 1606 it was reconquered by Spanish troops led by Spinola. In 1627 Groenlo was besieged and conquered by Frederik Hendrik, one of Groenlo's most important historical events. This happening still has its effects in present-day in the form of street names and the names of establishments in the city. Two restaurants in its historical center are appropriately named Frederik Hendrik and "Het Belegh van Grol" (The Siege of Grol). The battles of the Eighty Years' War are re-enacted regularly, drawing sizable crowds. As part of wider tourist attraction plan, some of Groenlo's old bulwarks have been under restoration in 2007, causing some controversy making local and even national television, the reason being a large number of large trees that had to be cut down for the plan. Tourism is of major importance to Groenlo, with over 3500 tourists spending the night locally at given times.

Groenlo has been under Spanish control for a considerable time during its violent history, which has left its marks. The majority of the local population is of Catholic persuasion, an exception (together with Lichtenvoorde) in the mainly Protestant region. This has resulted in several Catholic traditions being celebrated locally, such as Carnaval and "Kermis", as well as a relatively large number of licensed establishment and festivities.

== Gallery ==
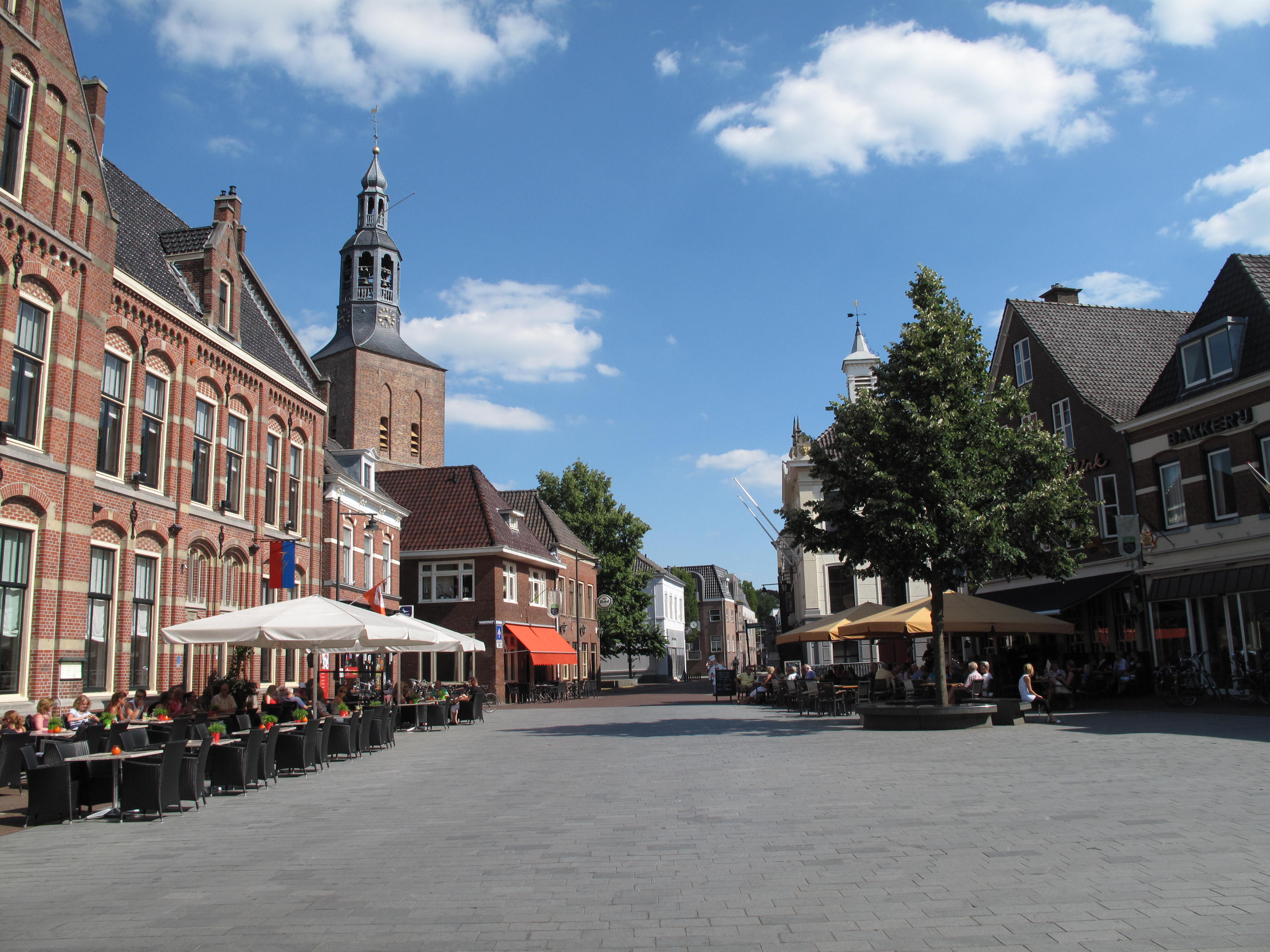
Groenlo, view to a street

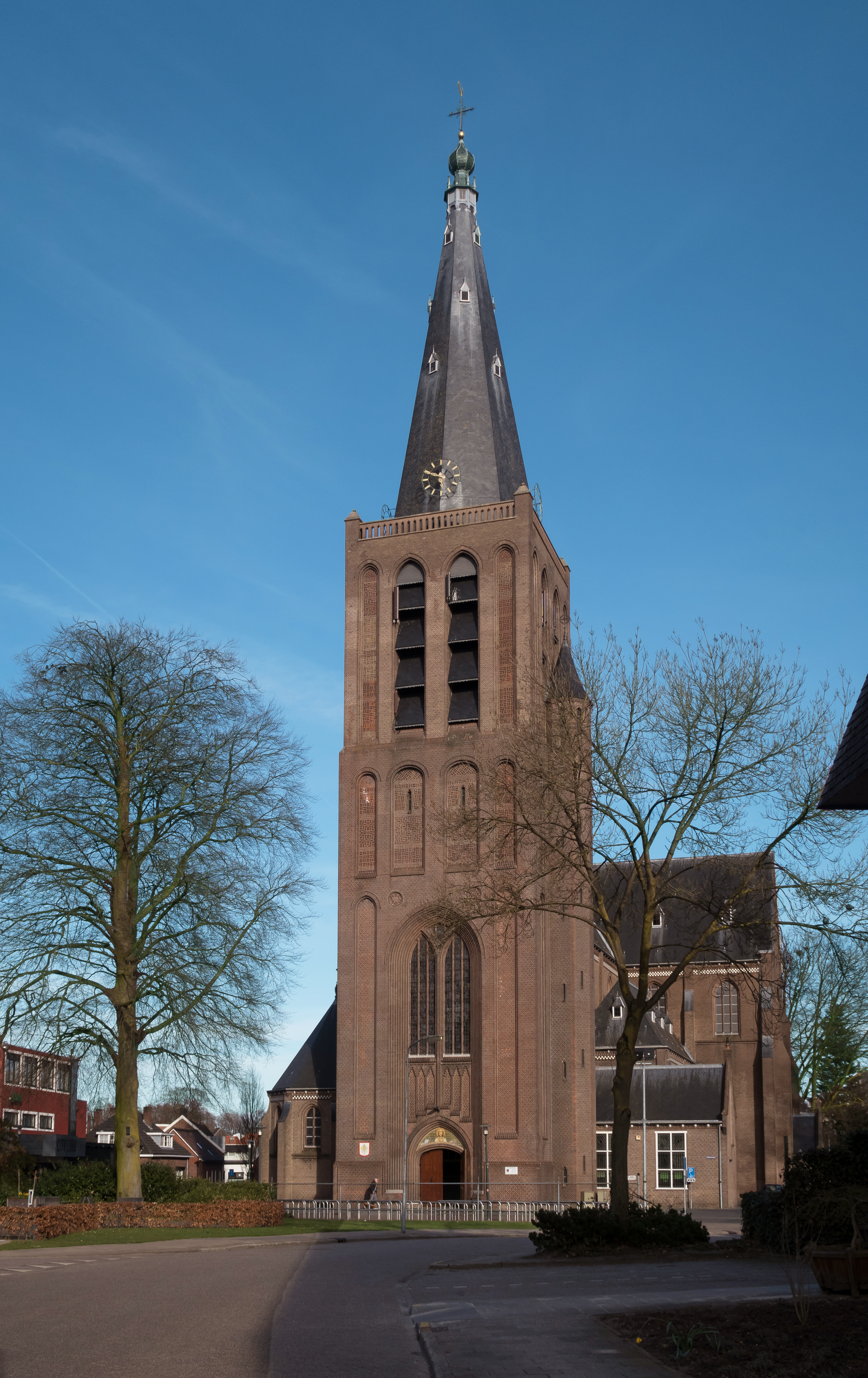
Groenlo, basilica
