= Battle of Delft (1573) =

1573 battle of the Eighty Years' War

- Part of the Eighty Years' War
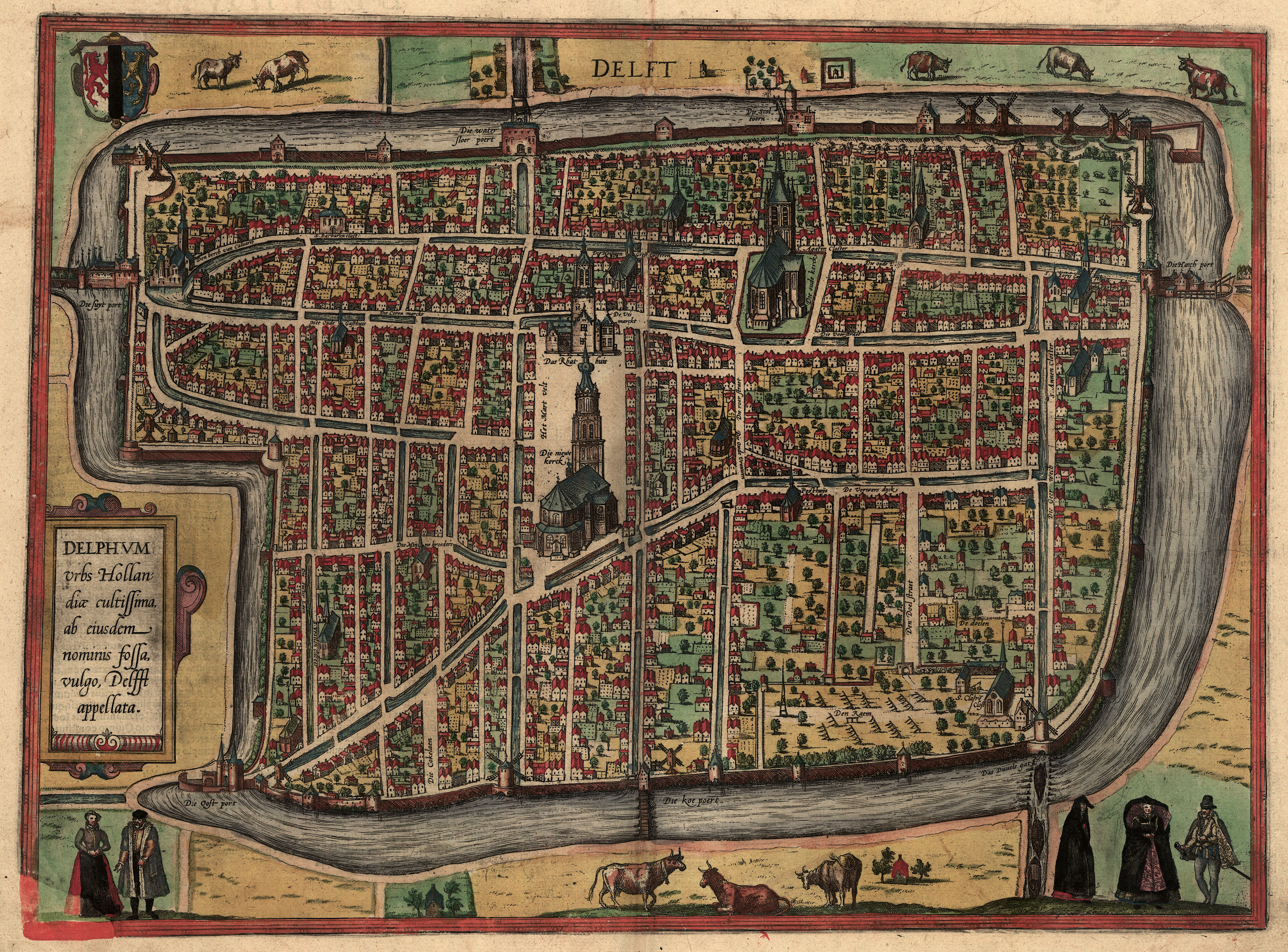
- A 1580 map of Delft by Georg Braun & Frans Hogenberg
Date	October 1573
Location	Delft (Present day Netherlands)
Result	Dutch rebel victory

Belligerents
Dutch rebels	Spain

Commanders and leaders
William of Orange; Thomas Morgan	(Spain) Francisco de Valdez (Spain) Julian Romero

Strength
6,000 (1,000 in Delft)	4,000

Casualties and losses
Unknown but low	700 casualties

The Battle of Delft, also known as the Defence of Delft, was a military engagement fought during the Eighty Years' War which took place in October 1573 in and outside the city of Delft. The battle was fought by a small Dutch rebel force under Thomas Morgan and an attacking Spanish force under Francisco de Valdez. The Spanish were repelled and forced to retreat.

== Background ==
The Spanish Governor of the Netherlands Fernando de Toledo (the 3rd Duke of Alba) had besieged Alkmaar in August but had been repelled. Soon after in early October, Leiden was besieged but a chance of a quick victory disappeared when the Spanish realised the city had stronger defences and a well stocked garrison. Alba then sent the master of his camp Francisco de Valdez with his veteran Tercio soldiers along with twelve companies of Walloons; in all numbering 4,000 men under the command of Julián Romero to advance deep into Holland. His objective was to seize the rich villages and outlying towns between Leiden, Delft, and the sea coast as far as the river Meuse (Dutch: Maas), so that all relief for Leiden could be cut off. Valdez captured The Hague without any resistance and soon the place was fortified by them.

Meanwhile, Thomas Morgan's regiment of English, several Scots, a few French Huguenot companies besides the troops under the command of the Prince of Orange were lodged in the villages between Delft and Rotterdam safely from the Spanish. They were positioned before large dykes on both sides of the roads. One position secured the Prince in control of the alluvial quadrangle watered on two sides by the rivers IJssel and the Meuse. One company of English held this position and was under the command of Roger Williams and included the poet George Gascoigne. Captain Edward Chester was posted in the Poldervaart Sconce, another fortified position in between Delft and Rotterdam. These troops were ready to shore up any last ditch defence if Delft, Rotterdam, and Delfshaven had been attacked by the Spanish.

== Attack ==
A Dutch force had made upon intelligence of the Spanish approach to Delft via the outskirts of The Hague. Romero and his Spaniards were entrenched at a stone bridge halfway between The Hague and Delft, and cut off the passage between that town and Leiden. The Dutch burnt all the houses on the outskirts denying the Spanish any shelter. The Prince had a total of 6,000 troops between Rotterdam and Delft but did not have enough experienced troops to meet the Spanish Tercios in open combat. Valdez did all he could with Leiden and Delft by using treachery or stealth in order to open the town port leading to Utrecht.

Valdez constructed a few peat boats which were manned with nearly a thousand hand-picked troops with the intention of gaining the city at night from different directions. A few boats managed to get through past the port entrance to Delft by use of a French spy, but the garrison was on full alert and managed to kill or capture all of the Spanish attackers. Meanwhile, at the Poldervaart Sconce outside Delft, Captain Chester with his company of 200 English men-at-arms highly distinguished themselves in repelling the attack, inflicting heavy casualties.

With this repulse Valdez then sought to make a large assault on the town. At the same time the garrison sought out the betrayers and with intelligence from Spanish prisoners were able to discover the townsmen, who were then dealt with. The garrison was then reinforced from nearby villages to expand to just over 1,000, most of whom had entered the following night. In addition cannons were loaded with whatever could be found such as nails and musket balls.

The main attack, however, never came, as Valdez had discovered that the defences were much stronger and realised that a major assault on the city was out of the question. As a result, he abandoned the Delft enterprise and the Spanish withdrew.

== Aftermath ==
The attack on the city had been defeated, and the Spanish had lost in all around 700 men, mostly on the outskirts. Delft, along other Dutch towns and cities, had been saved. This meant that Leiden had a better hope of relief.

After these attempts, Valdez informed the Duke of Alba of his defeat, showing him that victory could not be achieved without a larger force along with siege artillery. He requested more troops and guns or leave to retire himself from the area with the troops he had; the latter was chosen as Alba refused more men or guns. Romero, meanwhile, managed to capture Maassluis, but an attempt on Delftshaven was repelled, and no further efforts were made for the rest of year.

For his action in helping to repel the Spanish attack on the city, the Prince of Orange promoted Chester to the rank of lieutenant colonel. The Duke of Alba, after this bout of failures, and as a result of his violent councils, solicited to be recalled and thus departed the Netherlands in 1574.
