= Groenedijk Monument =

Coordinates: 51°55′37″N 4°36′28″E

The Groenedijk Monument, also known as the Dukdalf, is a monument in Capelle aan den IJssel that serves as a memorial for the events that took place in 1574 related to the Eighty Years' War, also known as the Dutch Revolt. During the conflict, William the Silent ordered the destruction of several dykes to stop the Spaniards who were surrounding the Dutch city of Leiden. The tactic proved to be successful, as the Spanish troops were greatly affected by the incoming water, which took them by surprise. The Spanish troops lost their mobility, whereas the troops mustered by William the Silent had prepared for the water using small ships. With the help of the controlled destruction of dykes in four strategic locations, the city could be freed with the help of the Sea Beggars, better known as the Geuzen. The people in Leiden, who had been starving for months, could now be fed with herring, which became a Dutch tradition to remember the Siege of Leiden.

== History ==
During the Dutch Revolt, Spanish troop under the direct supervision of the Duke of Alba, wanted to force the city of Leiden, which was a notable city in The Netherlands at the time, into submission. Spanish troops mostly had military successes up to 1574 leaving the Dutch people in disparity and starvation. The Siege at the city of Leiden was no outlier to this. Even though the besieging circumstances were horrific for the Spanish troops, they managed to surround the city successfully. A long lasting siege started which took lives on both sides of the city walls. The breaking of the dykes was something Spanish forces were not at all prepared for and the Dutch had gained the help of the Sea Beggars. This was a pirate like group of people who had turned to help the Dutch and were very effective in their endeavor of hindering or beating down the Spanish cause. The Sea Beggars were crucial in the Relief of Leiden as the destroying of the dykes had caused much of the land surrounding Leiden to be underwater. The Sea Beggars had boats to sail over this water and attack or scare away the Spanish troops who were, as a result of the water, trapped either in the water or on small hills which were surrounded by water. The Sea Beggars together with the rest of the Dutch rebel force were able to bring food to the starving population of Leiden, which by now has become a tradition. Every year the Relief of Leiden is celebrated in the Netherlands on the third of October. People come together and eat the traditional herring with white bread, the same food the Sea Beggars gave to the starved people in Leiden. Up until now the breaking of the dyke at Capelle aan den IJssel and at several other places is often seen as one of the crucial moments in the creation of the Dutch Republic and the start of freedom.

== The Monument ==
The monument was designed by J. Nieuwehuis, an employee of the Dutch governmental company Rijkswaterstaat. The monument is meant as an ironic gesture towards the Spanish Duke of Alba who is up until today a hated figure in Dutch History due to his radical approach towards the Dutch population at the time. The name Dukdalf was inspired on the Sea Beggars who had a great part in the relief of the besieging of Leiden. They named it after a commonly referred to method used by water lock managers in their effort to keep ships from sailing into the water lock. This name has little to no relation to the events that are represented by the monument. The monument consists of four pillars and each pillar has an inscription. One of which is a portrayal of William the Silent on a horse. The other three each are textual representations of the breaking of the dykes. one honors the Sea Beggars and the Orange prince (William the Silent), the other describes the date on which the monument was created which was on the third of October 1984 and this opening was celebrated by Mr. S. Patijn; a commissioner for the King operating in the Dutch province of South Holland. The last textual representation describes the breaking of the dykes themselves.
