= Siege of Bergen op Zoom =

Siege of Bergen op Zoom may refer to:

- Siege of Bergen op Zoom (1588)
- Siege of Bergen op Zoom (1622)
- Siege of Bergen op Zoom (1747), during the War of the Austrian Succession
- Siege of Bergen op Zoom (1814), during the Napoleonic Wars
