= Louis de Boisot =

Admiral of the Zeeland Sea Beggar fleet (circa 1530-1576)

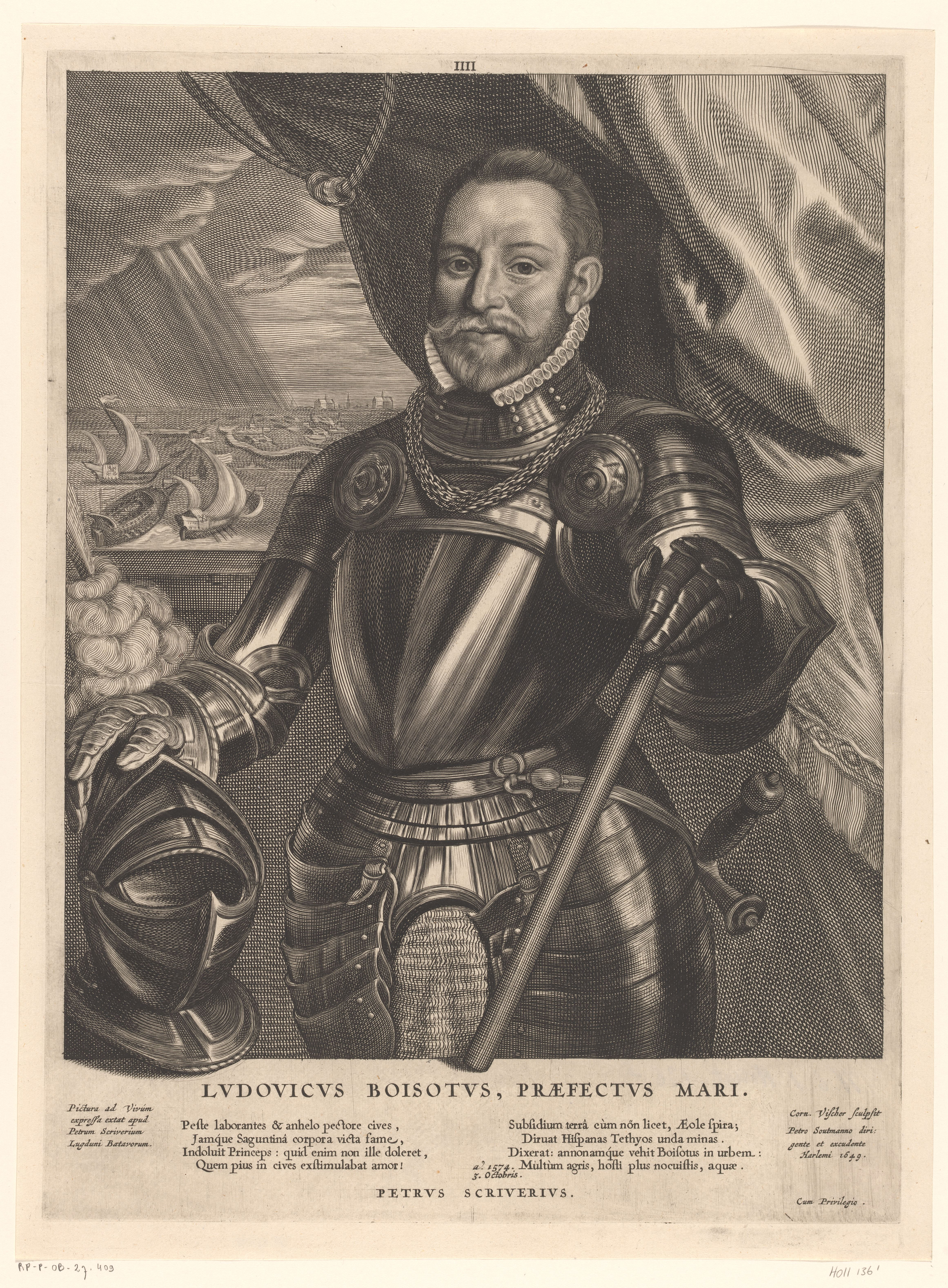
- Louis de Boisot by Cornelis Visscher.
- Born: 1530
- Died: 27 May 1576

Louis de Boisot, also called Lodewijk van Boisot in Dutch, was a noble from the Duchy of Brabant and an admiral of the Zeeland Geuzen (Sea Beggars) early in the Eighty Years' War. In October 1574 de Boisot's beggar fleet lifted the Siege of Leiden.

== Early years ==
Louis de Boisot was born in Brussels. His father, Pierre de Boisot, was treasurer-general in the service of Charles V, Holy Roman Emperor and, later, the regent Mary of Hungary. His mother's name was Louise de Tisnack. He became interested in Calvinism which he studied in Geneva.

Although uninvolved, in 1567 de Boisot fled from the special inquisition set up to punish the riots during the Dutch Iconoclasm of 1566.

== William the Silent ==
In 1567 de Boisot made contact with William the Silent (also known as Prince William of Orange) who became the main leader of the Dutch Revolt against the Spanish Habsburgs, and visited him in 1568 in Dillenburg, part of modern-day Germany.
