= Francisco de Valdez =

Spanish general

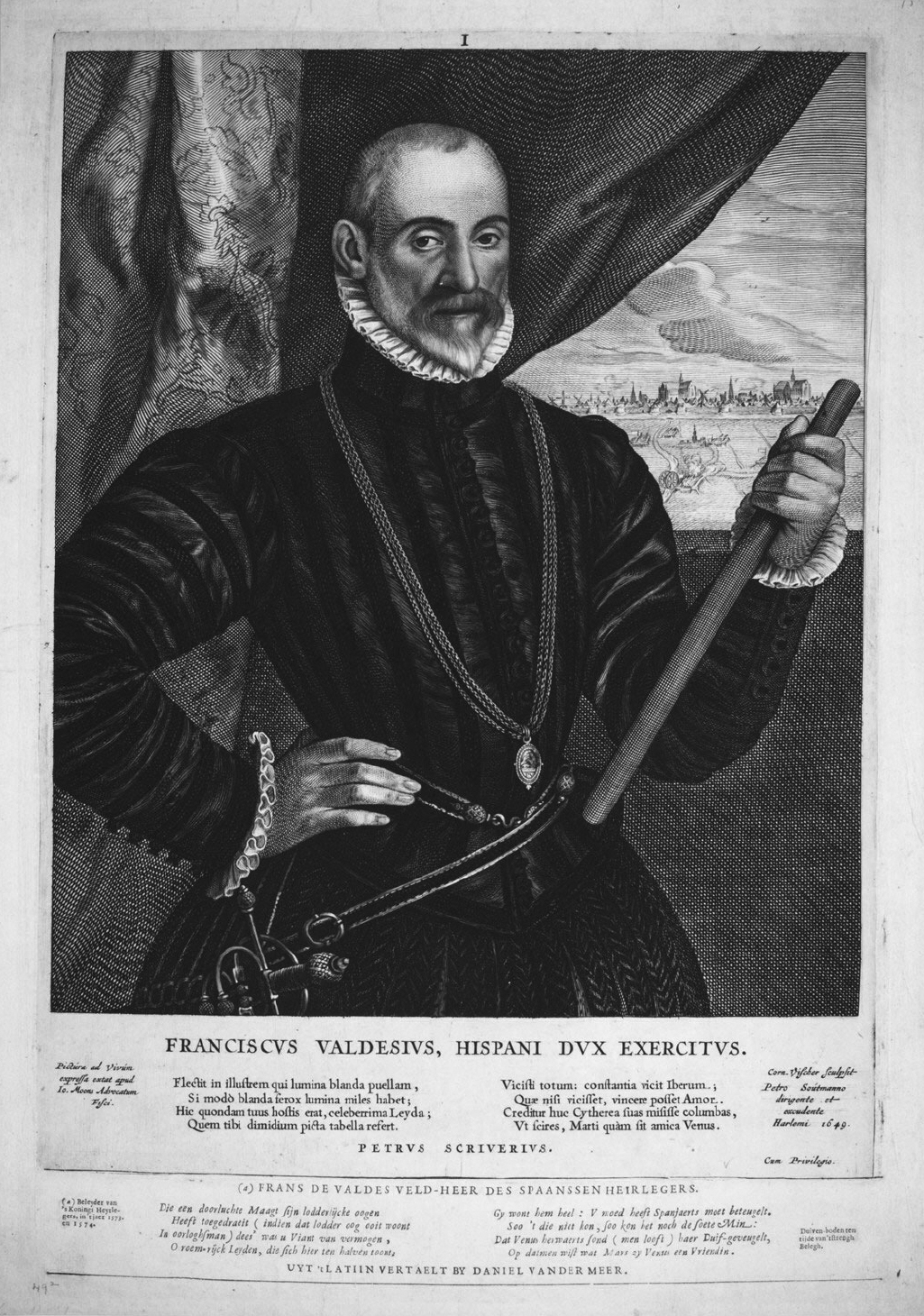
Francisco de Valdez (Cornelis de Visscher II, 1649)

Francisco Valdez (1522? – 1580?) was a Spanish general during the Eighty Years War. He had command over the besieging forces of the Army of Flanders during the Siege of Leiden commencing in 1573 and led the failed attack on the city of Delft the same year.

== Early life ==
Born a peasant, Valdez served Emperor Charles V in the 1546 war with the Protestant factions of the Holy Roman Empire, and in 1550 he led an expedition against Tunis. In 1567 he accompanied the Duke of Alva to the Netherlands, to restore the authority of Philip II of Spain at the outbreak of the Dutch Revolt. He was married to Magdalena Moons in 1574.
