= Thomas Morgan (died 1595) =

Welsh soldier and politician

Thomas Morgan (c. 1542 – 1595) was a Welsh professional soldier and politician.

Morgan had volunteered his services by raising a regiment and fought against the Spanish in the outbreak of the Eighty Years War fighting in battles such as the Relief of Goes in 1572, the defence of Delft in 1573 and the naval victory in the Scheldt the following year.

Morgan was governor of the predominantly English garrison at Bergen Op Zoom in the Netherlands from 1587 through until 1593. During his time he was able with the help of Lord Willoughby to inflict a defeat on the Duke of Parma attempting to besiege the city in September 1588.

He was a Member (MP) of the Parliament of England for Shaftesbury in 1571 and Wilton in 1593.
