= Lammenschans =

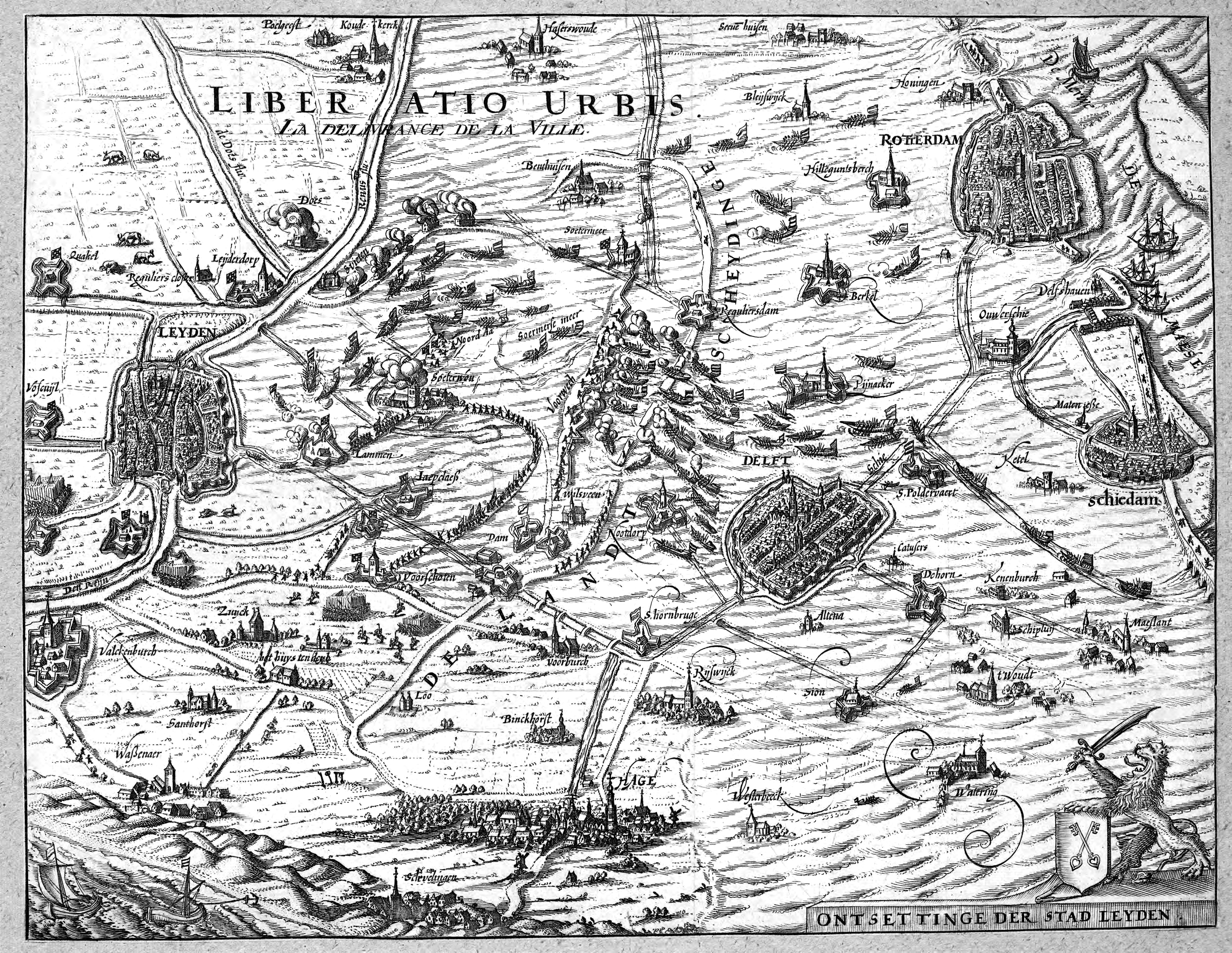
Scene of the Leiden rescue on 2-3 Oktober 1574, showing Leiden on the left and fort Lammen to the right of it with the flooded fields with rebel fleet that rowed up from Delft (center) and Rotterdam (above right)

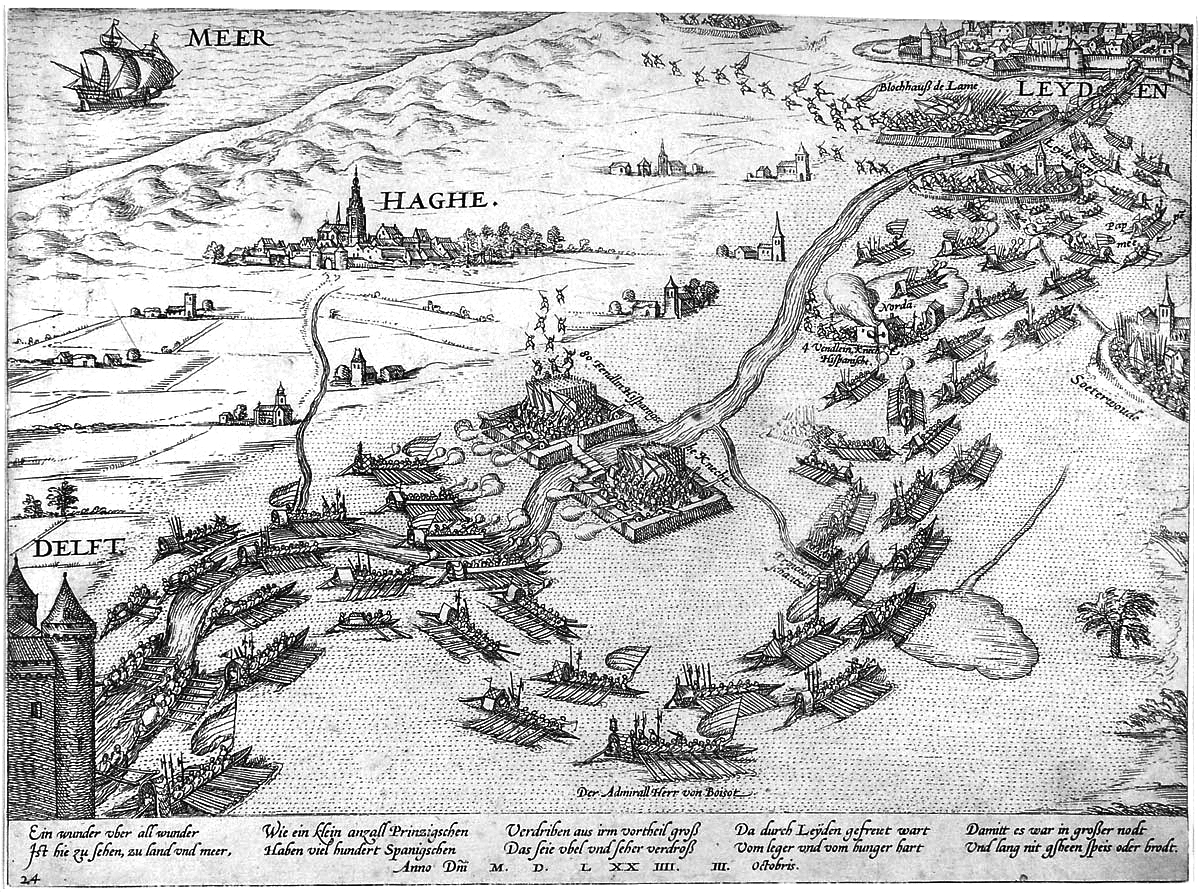
Same scene with Leiden upper right and the Blochhauss de Lame just below it on the Vliet

Lammenschans refers to a former fort located in Leiden along the Vliet. In October 2020 remains of the fort were found near a modern bridge called Lammebrug, about half a kilometre more southerly than earlier assumed (52.1404°N, 4.4878°E). According to local legend, a large Spanish cooking pot filled with hutspot was found there on 3 Oktober 1574 by Cornelis Joppenszoon after the Spanish forces fled at the conclusion of the Siege of Leiden. Later historians have concluded that this pot, which today is in the collection of the Museum De Lakenhal, was actually found by Gijsbert Cornelisz. Schaeck and was engraved with the story by his son in the 17th century. A statue of Cornelis Joppensz with his pot can be seen at the train station today. The Leiden rescue, or Leidens Ontzet is celebrated each year in Leiden on October 3.

== History ==
After 1574, the Lammen fort was eventually dismantled when the city of Leiden expanded its borders. Period drawings show that all that remained was the raised ground which had formed the basis for a fortified position.

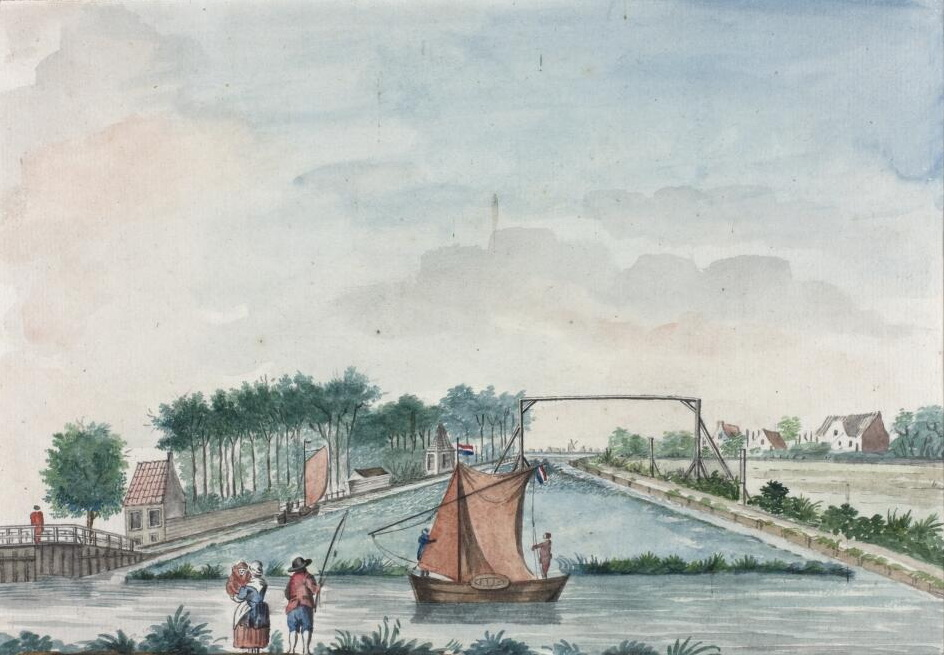
Looking southwest along the Vliet towards Voorschoten from Lammen, by Jacob Timmermans in 1788

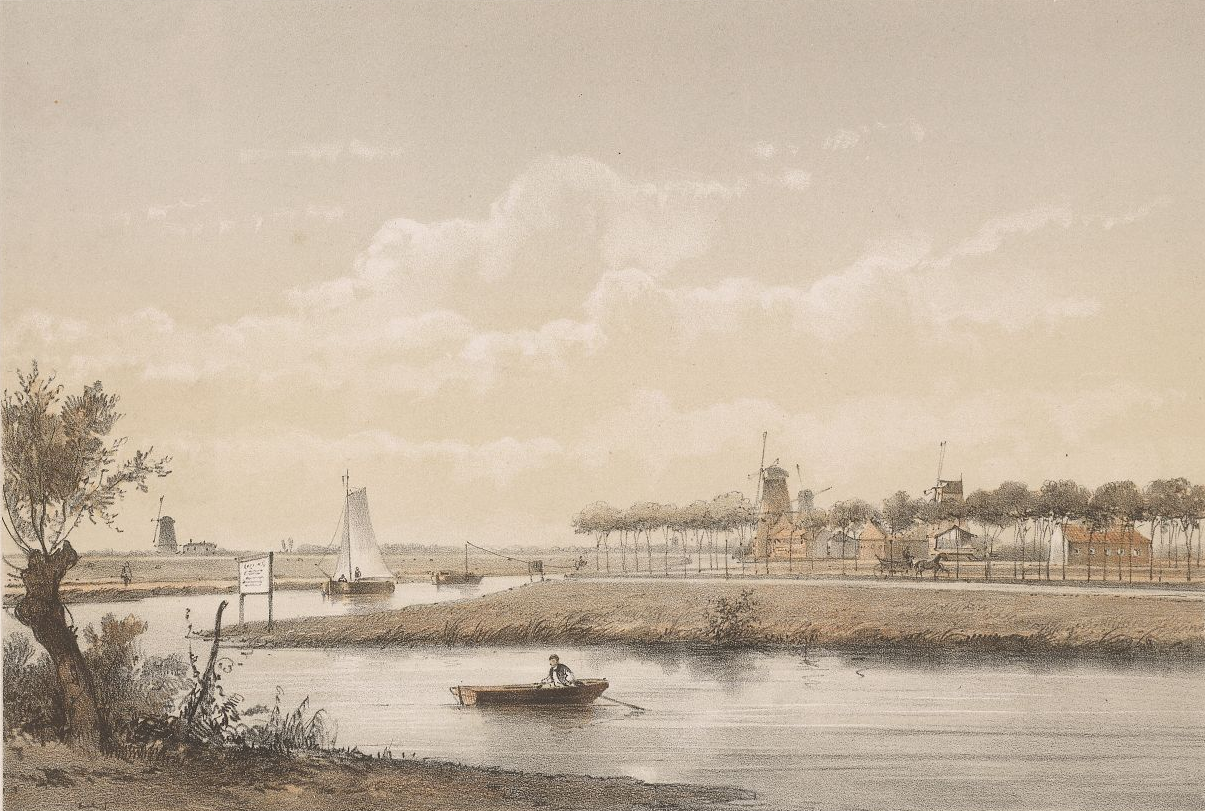
The Lammenschans at the junction of the Vliet and Roomburgerwetering, by Gerardus Johannes Bos in 1850

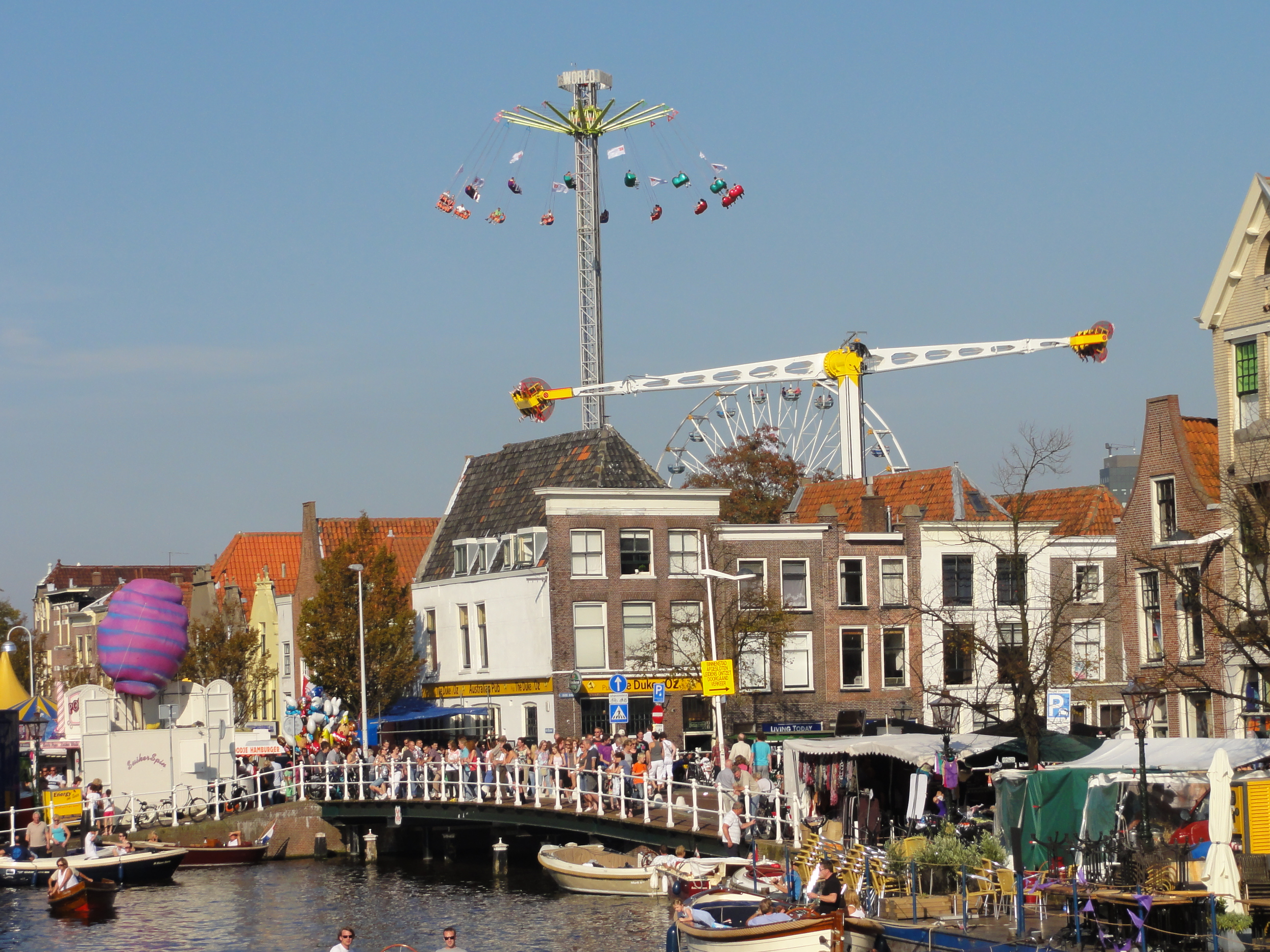
Leiden Ontzet celebration

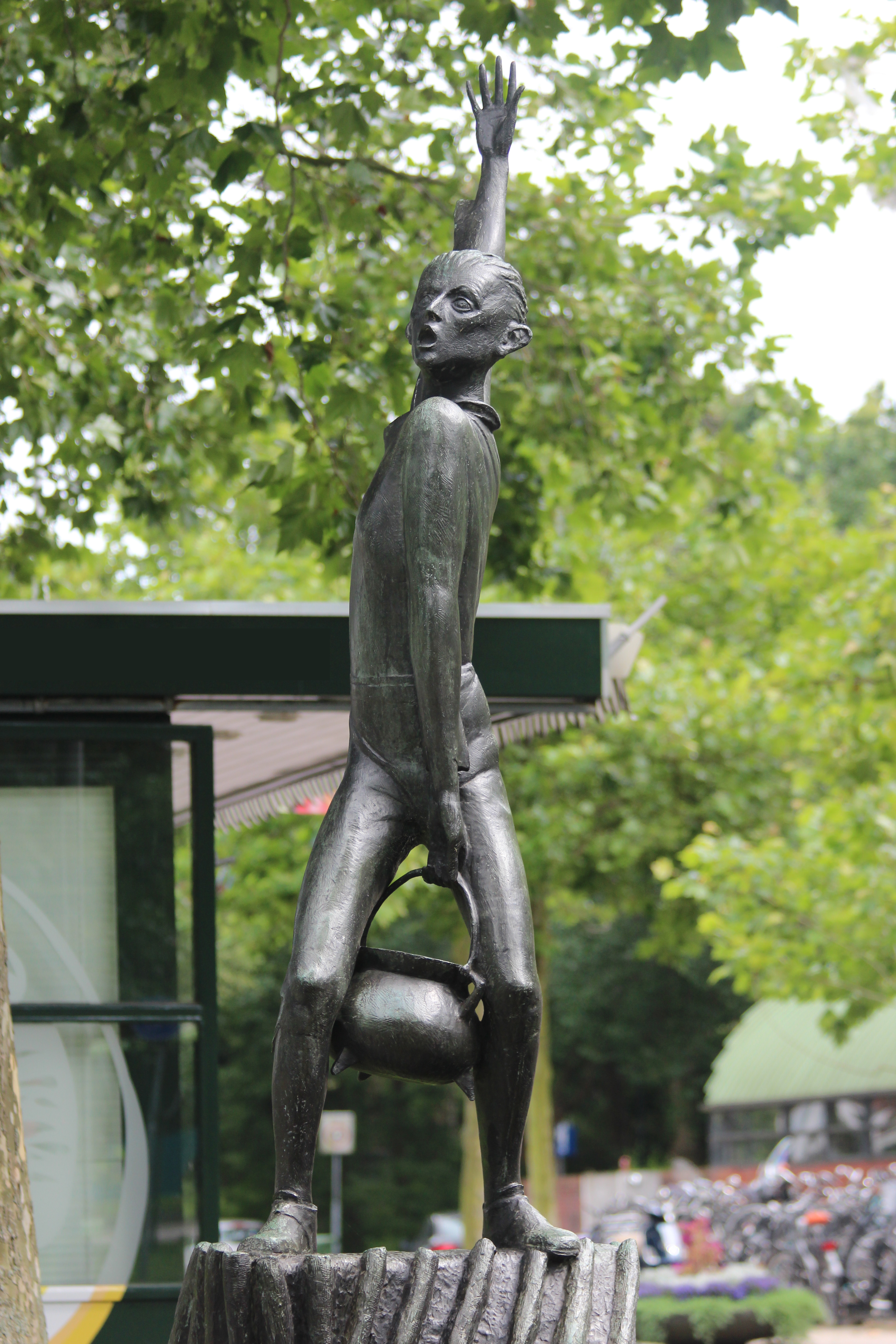
Modern recreation of Cornelis Joppensz with his pot of hutspot, by Oswald L. Wenckebach in 1961
