= Magdalena Moons =

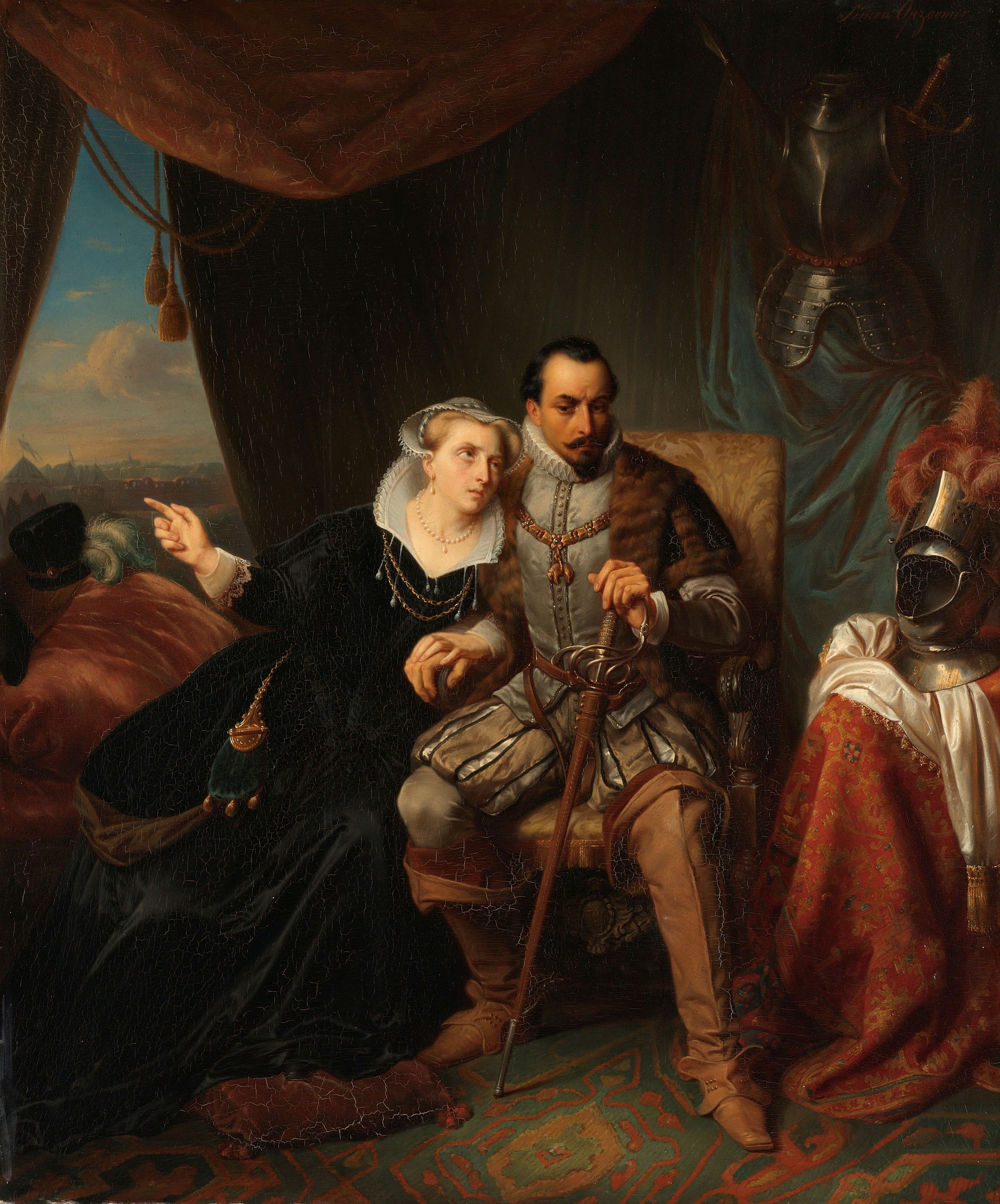
Magdalena Moons implores her fiancé Francisco de Valdez to put off the storming of Leiden for another night (painting by Simon Opzoomer)

Magdalena Moons (24 January 1541 – 15 June 1613) was a Dutch woman known for her role in saving the city of Leiden during its first siege by Spain in 1574 during the Eighty Years' War.

Moons was born in The Hague. A Catholic, she was the daughter of the judge Pieter Moons. She promised the 30 years older Spanish commander, Francisco de Valdez (1511-1580), to marry him if he stopped Spanish attacks on the starving city for a while, as her relatives were there, with the result that reinforcements were given time to arrive and the siege was broken.

The story was famous in its time and often told by both sides during the war.

Moons died in Utrecht.
