= Siege of Bergen op Zoom (1588) =

1588 siege

Siege of Bergen-op-Zoom
- Part of the Eighty Years' War and the Anglo-Spanish War (1585–1604)
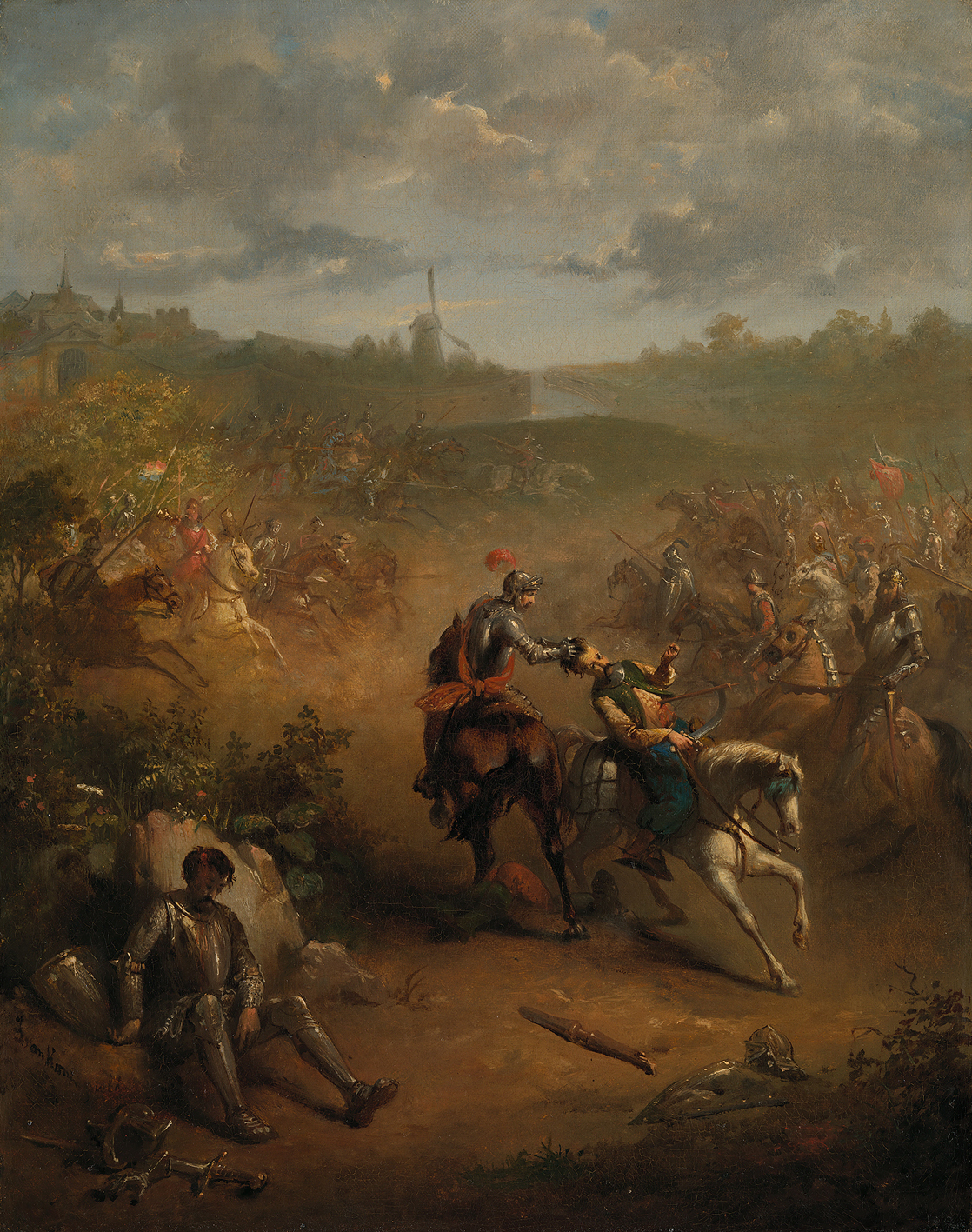
- Anno 1588. Marcelis Bax's brave performance during a sortie
Date	September 23 – November 13, 1588
Location	Bergen op Zoom, Brabant (present-day the Netherlands) 51°30′N 4°18′E
Result	Anglo-Dutch victory

Belligerents
England; Dutch Republic	(Spain) Spanish Empire

Commanders and leaders
(England) Peregrine Bertie (England) Thomas Morgan (Dutch Republic) Maurice of Orange	(Spain) Duke of Parma (Spain) Sancho Martínez de Leyva

Strength
5,000	20,000

Casualties and losses
Low	1,000

The siege of Bergen op Zoom was a siege that took place between September 23 - November 13, 1588, during the Eighty Years' War and the Anglo-Spanish War (1585–1604). The siege took place in the aftermath of the Spanish Armada when famed commander Alexander Farnese, the Duke of Parma attempted to use his forces to besiege Bergen op Zoom, which was held by an Anglo-Dutch force under Thomas Morgan and Peregrine Bertie. An English officer named Grimstone, claiming to be a disaffected Catholic, had set up a trap during which a large Spanish assault was bloodily repulsed. An Anglo-Dutch relief column under the command Maurice of Orange arrived soon after and forced the Duke of Parma to retreat, thus ending the siege.

== Background ==
England had been freed from danger following the failure of the Spanish Armada during the summer of 1588. At the same time the Duke of Parma with his army which had been assembled for the invasion then stood his troops down.

Parma instead turned and then marched through Brabant with the aim of taking Bergen op Zoom before winter set in. Parma sent a regiment under the Marquis de Renty, with troops numbering 8,000 men under Count Mansfelt, the Prince of Ascoli, and the Duke of Pastrana, in advance to attempt the capture of the island of Tholen. On it was an important town of the same name to the north of Bergen op Zoom, on the opposite side of the channel of the Scheldt separating the island from the mainland of Brabant. The governor of Bergen op Zoom was Thomas Morgan and the garrison was predominantly English - composed of twelve ensigns of English foot and three cornets of Dutch cavalry under the commands of Peregrine Bertie (Lord Willoughby) and Sir William Drury.

Morgan had been in England supervising the defence of the English coast during the armada campaign, leaving Lord Willoughby in charge. Willoughby in the meantime had worked hard to put Bergen op Zoom in a good form of defence. He constructed two blinds outside the Wouw Gate, to cover the drawbridges and protect sallying parties, and some other outworks, connected by covered ways. He had advice from Count Everard Solms, who came over from Tholen, where he commanded the Zeeland regiment.

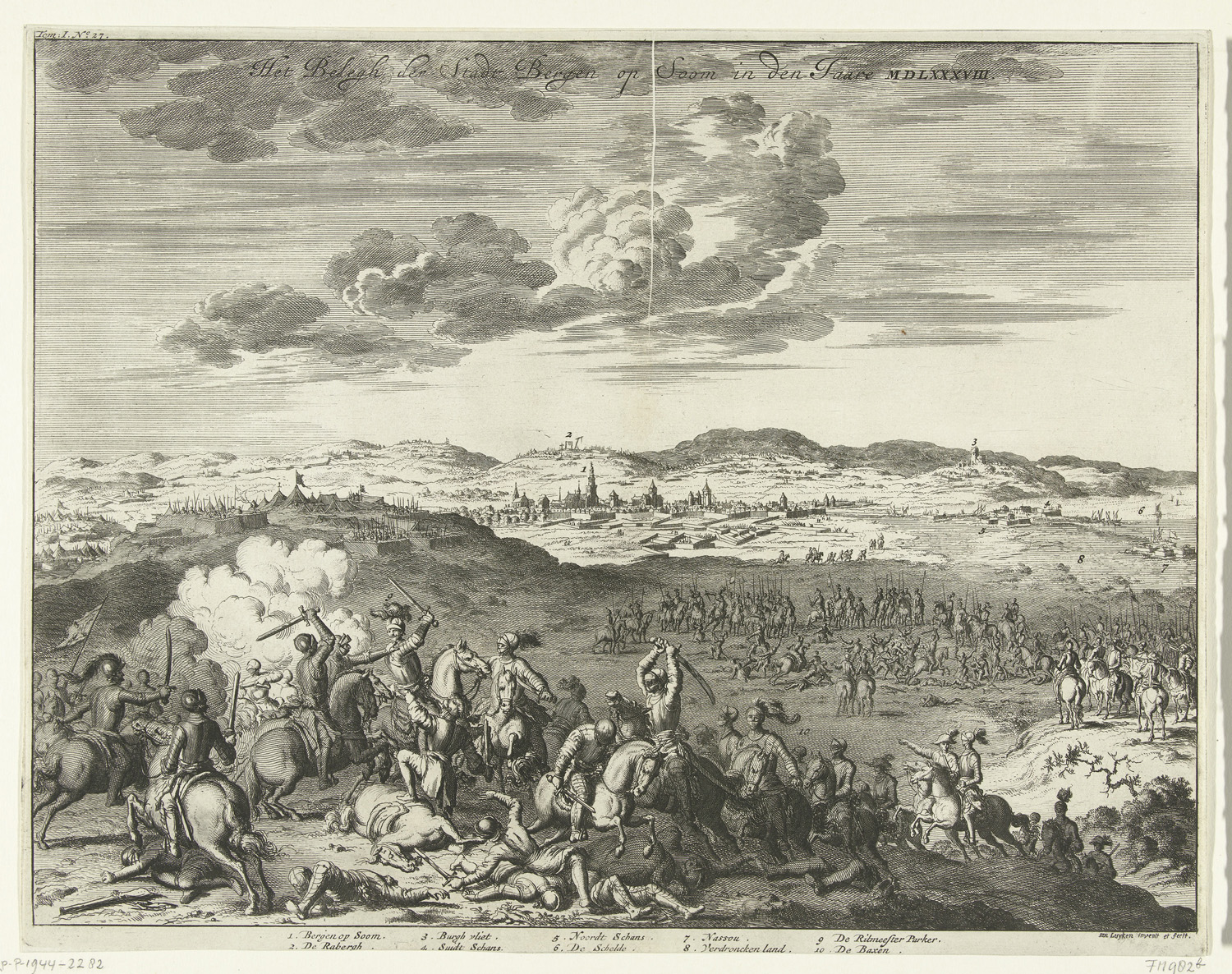
Dutch cavalry attacking Spanish siege lines during the Siege of the Anglo-Dutch town of Bergen-op-Zoom by the Duke of Parma 1588 - by Jan Luyken

As the Spanish force advanced through Tholen they attacked the town but after several attempts were vigorously repulsed by Solmes and his Zealand troops who had inflicted nearly 400 casualties. The commanders themselves narrowly escaped drowning in the retreat across the river owing to the sudden rise of the waters. Parma, despite the defeat, wasted no time and pressed on towards Bergen-op-Zoom.

== Siege ==
Morgan arrived back from England and found that Parma had surrounded the place, but Willougby was able to act. The waters of the dykes were let out by the defenders of the city and poured over the countryside. With the exception of some elevated points occupied by Parma's forces, the whole country was overflowed. The Spanish army comprised almost 20,000 men and Morgan ordered sallies to be made against the besieging Spanish force whilst trenches and ravelins were built. Several were made from September 23 with success and forced the Spanish to flee from their entrenchments having lost a great deal of supplies, prisoners, and equipment. During one of the sallies a young Francis Vere received a wound from a pike to this leg.

Dutch militia cavalry under the command of Bergen op Zoom traders Paul and Marcellus Bax made a sortie on the Spanish lines all the way to Wouw, capturing a number of prisoners. On the same day a canal boat had left Antwerp during the morning and was set upon by a detachment of English troops. They captured it along with twelve prisoners and found 60,000 florins in money. This was a huge blow to Parma as the money was needed to pay the troops. Parma was unable to capture any of the water forts and so decided to turn the siege into blockade.

=== Grimstone ruse ===
During one of these sorties Robert Redhead, a sutler, had captured two very important Spanish prisoners: Cosimo d'Alexandrini and Pedro de Lugo a Commissary of the artillery. They had been captured not far from the North Fort by an English scouting party, Redhead was looking for items to sell to the troops inside when he stumbled across the Spanish officers checking the strength of the walls. The North Fort was a strong fortress which secured the entrance to Bergen op Zoom from the Scheldt on the north-east side. The two Spanish stayed as guests at the Lieutenant of the garrison's house belonging to William Grimstone and large bribes were offered to allow the Spanish into the North Gate. It was hoped that this would fall into the hands of Parma thus making the capture of Bergen a lot easier. Willoughby soon discovered this and by his orders pretended to give a ready consent to the proposal. As a ruse Grimstone pretended he was a staunch Catholic and were supporters of William Stanley the English turncoat. They secretly left the camp provided with letters from the two Spaniards to the Duke of Parma informing that everything was prepared for the admittance of the besiegers into the fort. On 6 October they soon met with Parma and were in conference - Parma obliged them to take an oath on the Sacrament that they were acting in good faith. Once this was done he gave them a large gold chain and promised a large sum of money in the event of success.

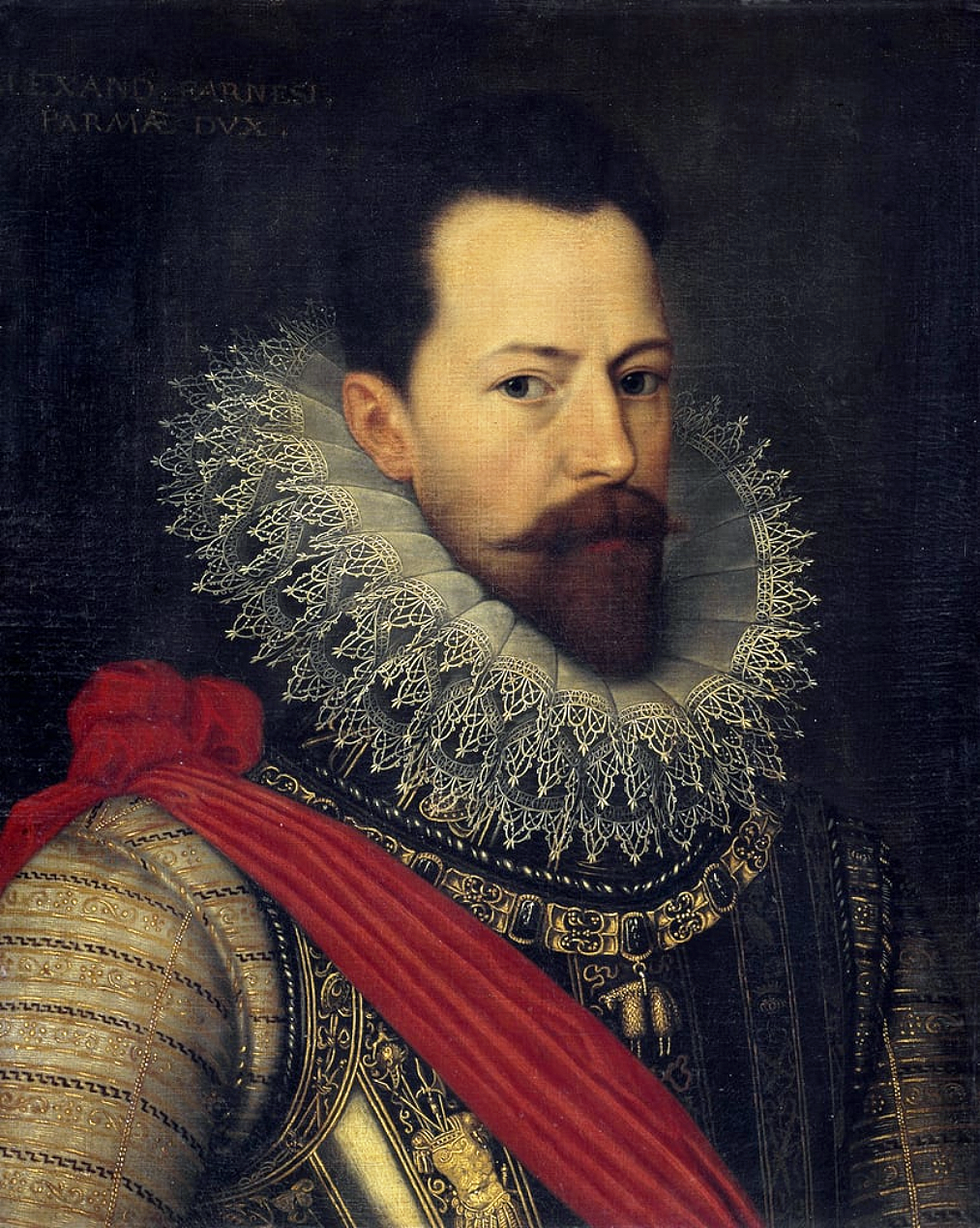
The Duke of Parma by Otto van Veen

Parma selected a band of one hundred handpicked musketeers to be followed by a much more considerable force two thousand in number under maestro de campo Don Sancho de Leyva. With him were Don Juan de Mendoza, Don Alonzo de Idiaquez, and William Stanley not much further behind under the guidance of Grimstone. Before the Spanish assault troops set forth the two Englishmen were tied and accompanied them. In an autumnal moonless evening in poor weather the Spanish force set off. They soon waded breast high in the waters of the Scheldt but after a time they reached the appointed gate. The external portcullis had been raised and the Spanish soon rushed into the town. At the next moment Willoughby cut the cords which held the portcullis and entrapped the advance guard of the Spanish. Francis Vere led the charge and were all at once put to the sword, while their followers were coming towards the gate.

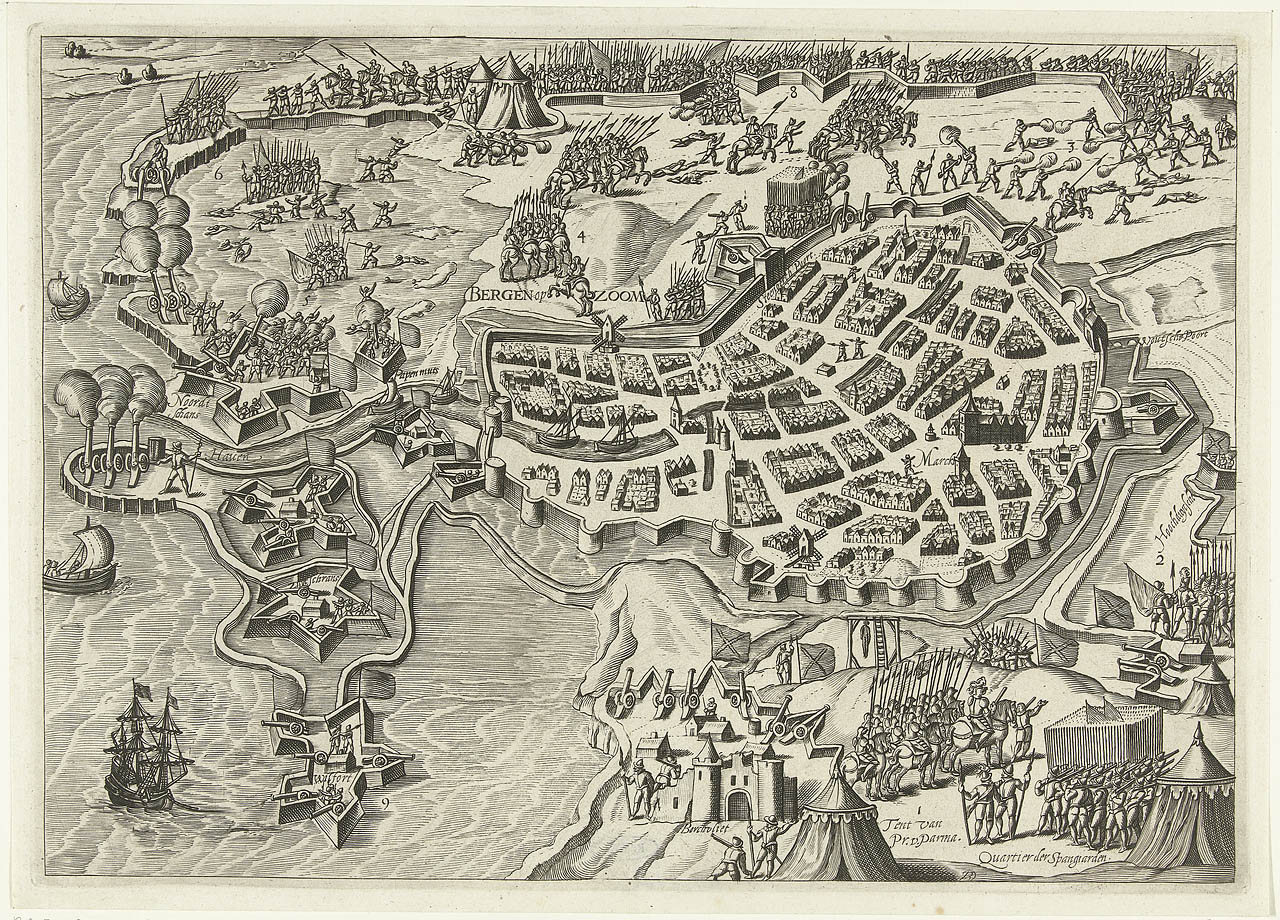
Siege of Bergen op Zoom in 1588 by the Duke of Parma Print by Bartholomeus Dolendo

As soon as the troops on the outside were aware of the trap into which they had fallen, the Spanish enraged by this refused to abandon the attack. They threw down the palisades and began a vigorous attack on the fortifications. At the same time the portcullis was swung wide open and a furious onslaught was made by the garrison upon the Spaniards. In the confusion the two English prisoners were able to escape unhurt. There was a fierce struggle, the Spanish could not get out of the trap; some were killed under the walls and the rest were soon speedily driven back. As they did so the Spanish were assailed on their retreat by an ambush on the dyke and the rest were hunted into the waters. They were utterly routed; a great number were killed or wounded and several high-ranking officers were taken prisoner.

To make matters worse the tide began to flow, and the soldiers who had easily waded across the moat were washed away - 300 were drowned in an attempt to reach the camp. Parma was horrified and couldn't believe what had happened as he saw the survivors coming back to their entrenchments; he realised that the siege had to be raised.

=== Relief ===
A relief force under Maurice of Orange arrived the day after with 600 Scots and Dutch put into the garrison. The force combined then promptly launched another attack driving the Spanish away from their entrenchments. With the arrival of the relief force the Spanish position was now completely untenable. Parma having lost many men and his provisions exhausted then set fire to his camp and on the night of November 12 retreated in some disorder. The following morning however the Spanish rearguard was assaulted by a pursuing English force of twenty ensigns of foot and cavalry, capturing more prisoners and supplies.

== Aftermath ==
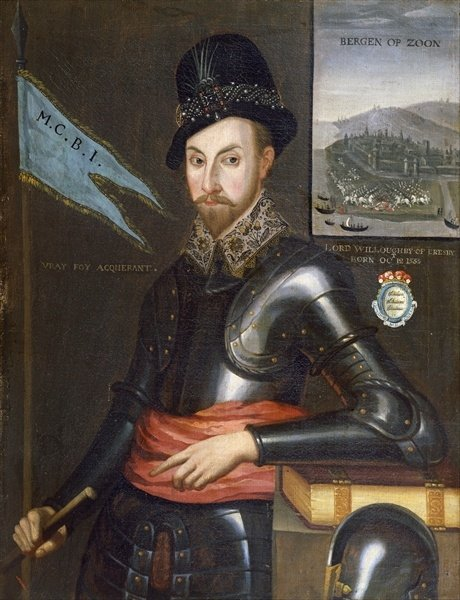
Peregrine Bertie, with siege of Bergen behind him

Parma and his army returned in defeat to Brussels, after a siege which had lasted six weeks. Willoughby had achieved an important victory in the eyes of Queen Elizabeth I especially so soon after the failure of the Spanish armada.

The Spanish lost 1,000 men to the garrison of Bergen op Zoom most of whom were killed or drowned in the assault. In addition to the repulse at Tholen and the armada campaign, Parma had lost in the region of some 10,000 men killed or dead from sickness. The Anglo-Dutch losses were minor save for some that were ill with disease. Grimston and Redhead received a present of 1,000 florins each from the Queen and an annuity of 600 florins.

The following year the Spanish army mutinied for pay; the war chest was empty for the money which was to have been replenished had been lost in the galleons of the Armada and the capture by the English of the canal boat from Antwerp. The treasury at home was utterly exhausted and extraordinary efforts had been made necessary for the protection of the Spanish colonies and the plate fleet. Parma then raised forts at Roosendaal, Turnhout, and Kempeu to check the incursions of the garrison of Bergen into Brabant. The Count of Mansfeld also captured the small town of Wachtendonck in Guelderland at the siege of which the bomb shell was first used having been invented shortly before by an artisan of Venlo.

Francis Vere had distinguished himself and was Knighted by Willoughby on the battlefield for bravery. Vere the following year would command the English army in the Netherlands after Willoughby's resignation and would hold this command for twenty years. He was highly esteemed by the Queen and also by the States General of the United Provinces.

Bergen op Zoom would continue to be in English and Dutch hands repulsing further Spanish sieges and attacks over the next forty years most notably during the siege in 1622 in which English troops also played a significant part.

== Bibliography ==
- Armstrong, Alastair (2002). The European Reformation, 1500-1610. Heinemann. ISBN 9780435327101.
- Black, Jeremy (2005). European Warfare, 1494-1660 Warfare and History. Routledge. ISBN 9781134477081.
- Buisman, Jan (2006). Duizend jaar weer, wind en water in de Lage Landen: 1575-1675, Volume 4. Van Wijnen. ISBN 9789051941432. (Dutch)
- Jaques, Tony (2006). Dictionary of Battles and Sieges: A Guide to 8500 Battles from Antiquity Through the Twenty-first Century. Greenwood Press. ISBN 978-0313335365.
- Marek y Villarino de Brugge, André (2020). Alessandro Farnese: Prince of Parma: Governor-General of the Netherlands (1545-1592): v. V. Los Angeles: MJV Enterprises, ltd., inc. ISBN 979-8689560397.
- Markham, C. R (2007). The Fighting Veres: Lives Of Sir Francis Vere And Sir Horace Vere. Kessinger Publishing. ISBN 978-1432549053.
- Meakin, H. L (2013). The Painted Closet of Lady Anne Bacon Drury. Ashgate Publishing. ISBN 9780754663973.
- Regan, Geoffrey (1992). The Guinness Book of Military Anecdotes. Canopy Books. ISBN 9781558594418.
- Robinson, Paul (2006). Military Honour and the Conduct of War: From Ancient Greece to Iraq. Routledge. ISBN 9781134165032.
- Wernham, R.B (1984). After the Armada: Elizabethan England and the Struggle for Western Europe : 1588-1595. Clarendon Press. ISBN 9780198227533.
- Wingfield, Jocelyn R (1993). Virginia's True Founder: Edward-Maria Wingfield and His Times, 1550-c.1614: the First Biography of the First President of the First Successful English Colony in the New World. Wingfield Family Society. ISBN 9780937543047.
- van der Hoeven, Marco (1997). Exercise of Arms: Warfare in the Netherlands, 1568-1648, Volume 1. Brill. ISBN 9789004107274.
