= Geuzen =

16th-century group of Dutch nobles opposing Spanish rule in the Netherlands

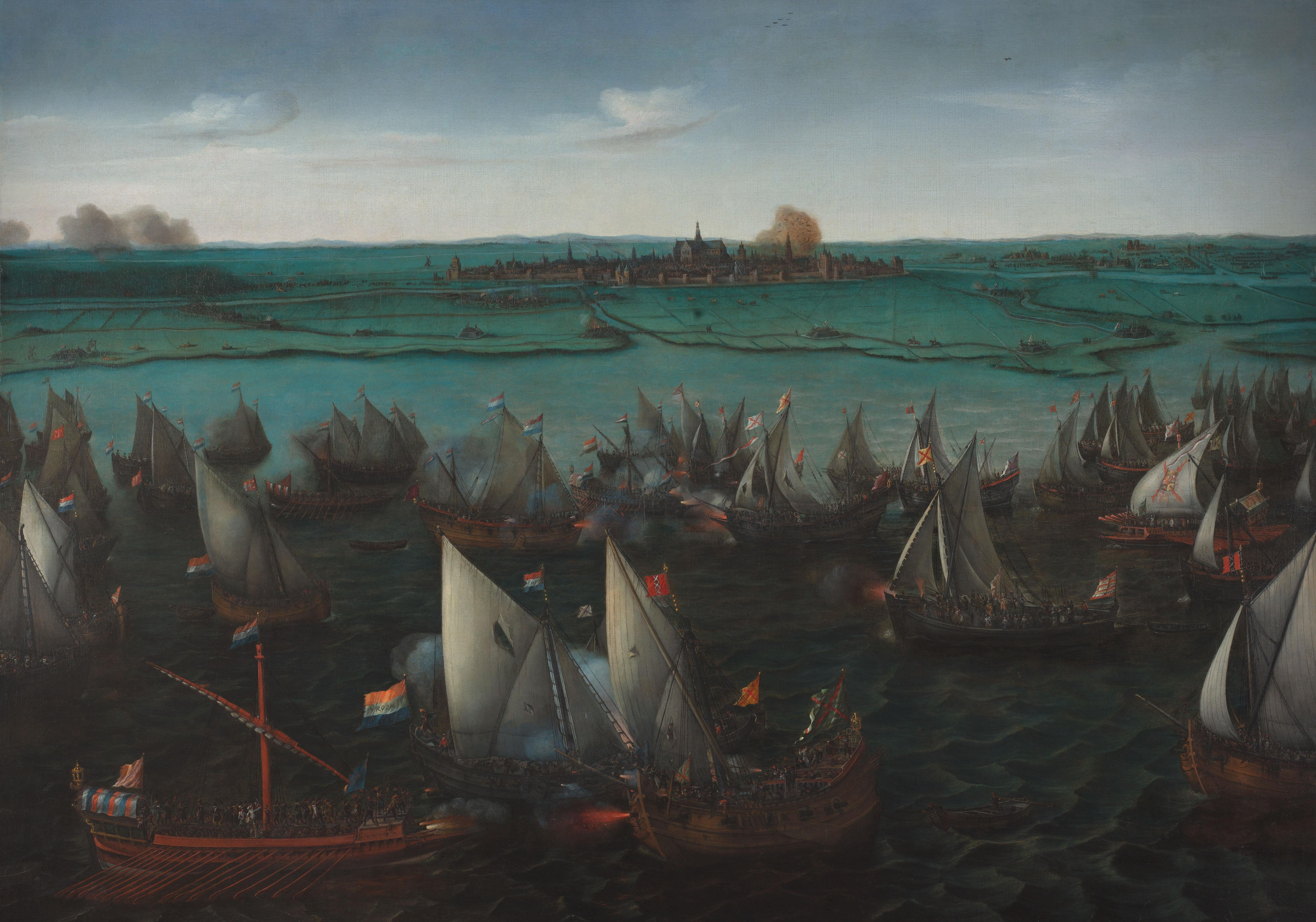
Battle between Dutch and Spanish ships on the Haarlemmermeer, 26 May 1573. Sailing before the wind from the right are the Spanish ships, identified by the flags with a red cross. Approaching from the left are the ships of the Sea Beggars. Hendrick Cornelisz Vroom.

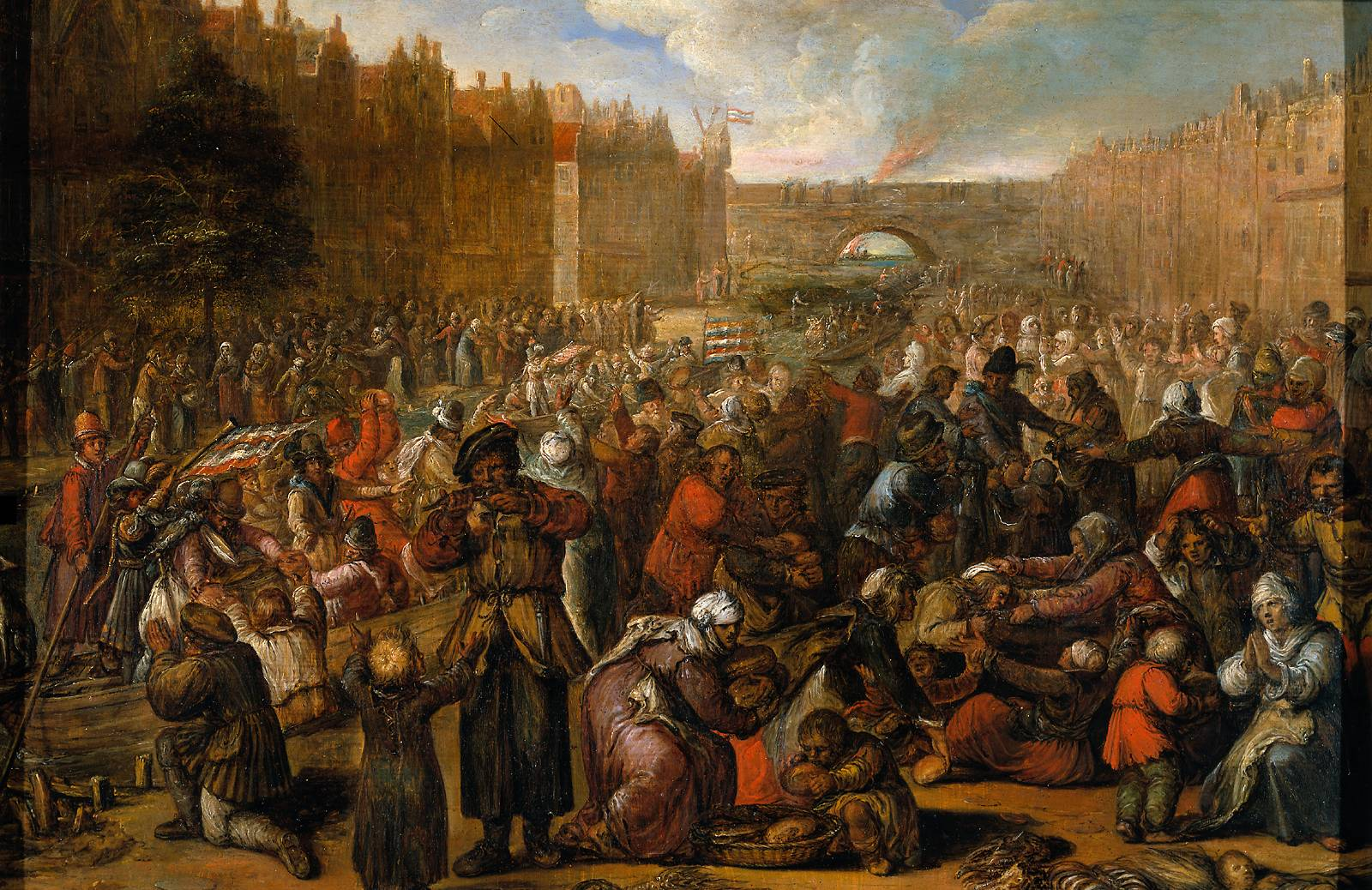
Relief of Leiden by the 'Sea Beggars' on flat-bottomed boats, on 3 October 1574, during the Siege of Leiden. Otto van Veen, 1574.

Geuzen (Dutch pronunciation: [ˈɣøːzə(n)]; lit. 'The Beggars'; French: Les Gueux; singular: Gueux) was a name assumed by the confederacy of Calvinist Dutch nobles, who from 1566 opposed Spanish rule in the Netherlands. The most successful group of them operated at sea, and so were called Watergeuzen (Dutch pronunciation: [ˈʋaːtərɣøːzə(n)]; lit. 'Water Beggars'; French: Gueux de mer). In the Eighty Years' War, the Capture of Brielle by the Watergeuzen in 1572 provided the first foothold on land for the rebels, who would conquer the northern Netherlands and establish an independent Dutch Republic. They can be considered either as privateers or pirates, depending on the circumstances or motivations.

== Origin of the name ==
The leaders of the nobles who signed a solemn league known as the Compromise of Nobles, by which they bound themselves to assist in defending the rights and liberties of the Netherlands against the civil and religious despotism of Philip II of Spain, were Louis of Nassau and Hendrick van Brederode. On 5 April 1566, permission was obtained for the confederates to present a petition of grievances, called the Request, to the regent, Margaret, Duchess of Parma. About 250 nobles marched to the palace accompanied by Louis of Nassau and Brederode. The regent was at first alarmed at the appearance of so large a body, but one of her councillors, Berlaymont, allegedly remarked "N'ayez pas peur Madame, ce ne sont que des gueux" ("Fear not madam, they are only beggars").

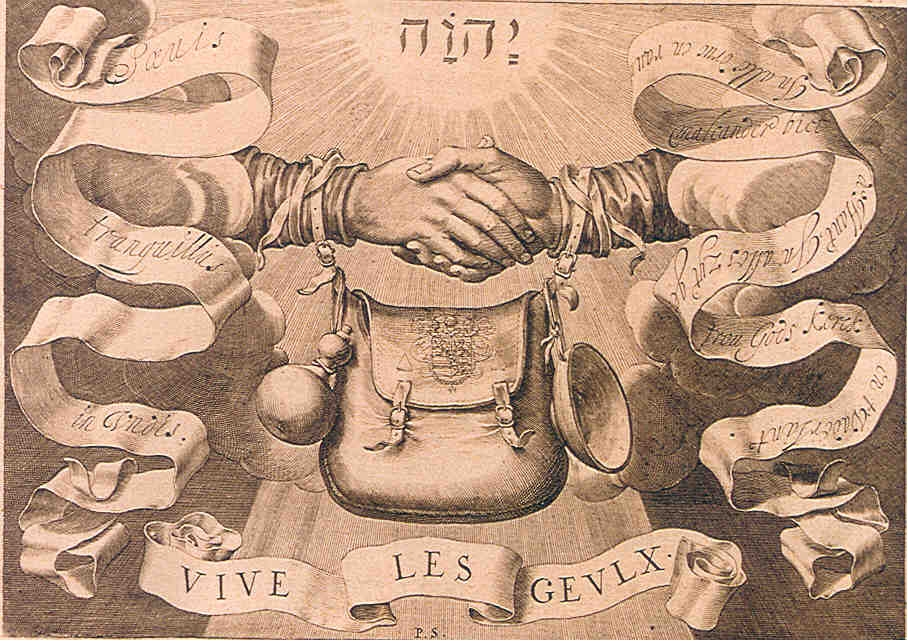
Traditional emblem of the Geuzen

The appellation was not forgotten. In a speech at a great feast held by some 300 confederates at the Hotel Culemburg three days later, Brederode declared that if need be they were all ready to become beggars in their country's cause. Henceforward the name became a party title. The patriot party adopted the emblems of beggary, the wallet and the bowl, as trinkets to be worn on their hats or their girdles, and a medal was struck having on one side the head of Philip II, on the other two clasped hands with the motto Fidèle au roy, jusqu'à porter la besace ("Loyal to the King, up to carrying the beggar's pouch"). The original league of Beggars was short-lived, crushed by Alba, but its principles survived and were to be ultimately triumphant.

In the Dutch language the word geuzennaam, lit. 'Begger-name', is used for linguistic reappropriation: a pejorative term used with pride by the people called that way.

== "Sea Beggars" ==
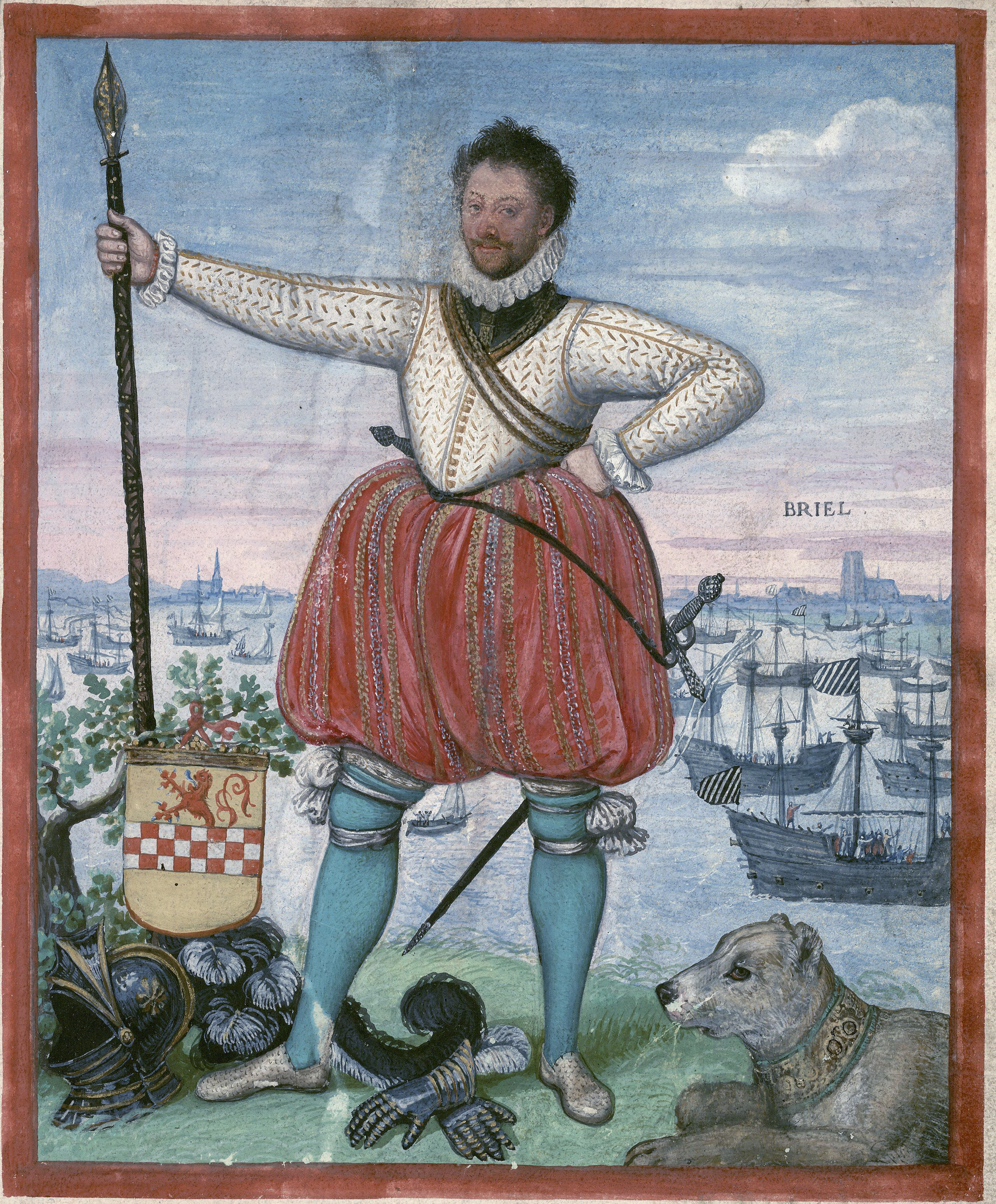
William II de la Marck (1542–1578), a leader of the Sea Beggars

In 1569 William of Orange, who had now openly placed himself at the head of the party of revolt, granted letters of marque to a number of vessels manned by crews of desperadoes drawn from all nationalities. Eighteen ships received letters of marque, which were equipped by Louis of Nassau in the French Huguenot port of La Rochelle, which they continued to use as a base.

These privateers under the command of a succession of daring and reckless leaders, the best-known of whom is William de la Marck, Lord of Lumey, were called "Sea Beggars", "Gueux de mer" in French, or "Watergeuzen" in Dutch. At first they were content merely to plunder both by sea and land, carrying their booty to the English ports where they were able to refit and replenish their stores. Already by the end of 1569, 84 Sea Beggars' ships were in action.

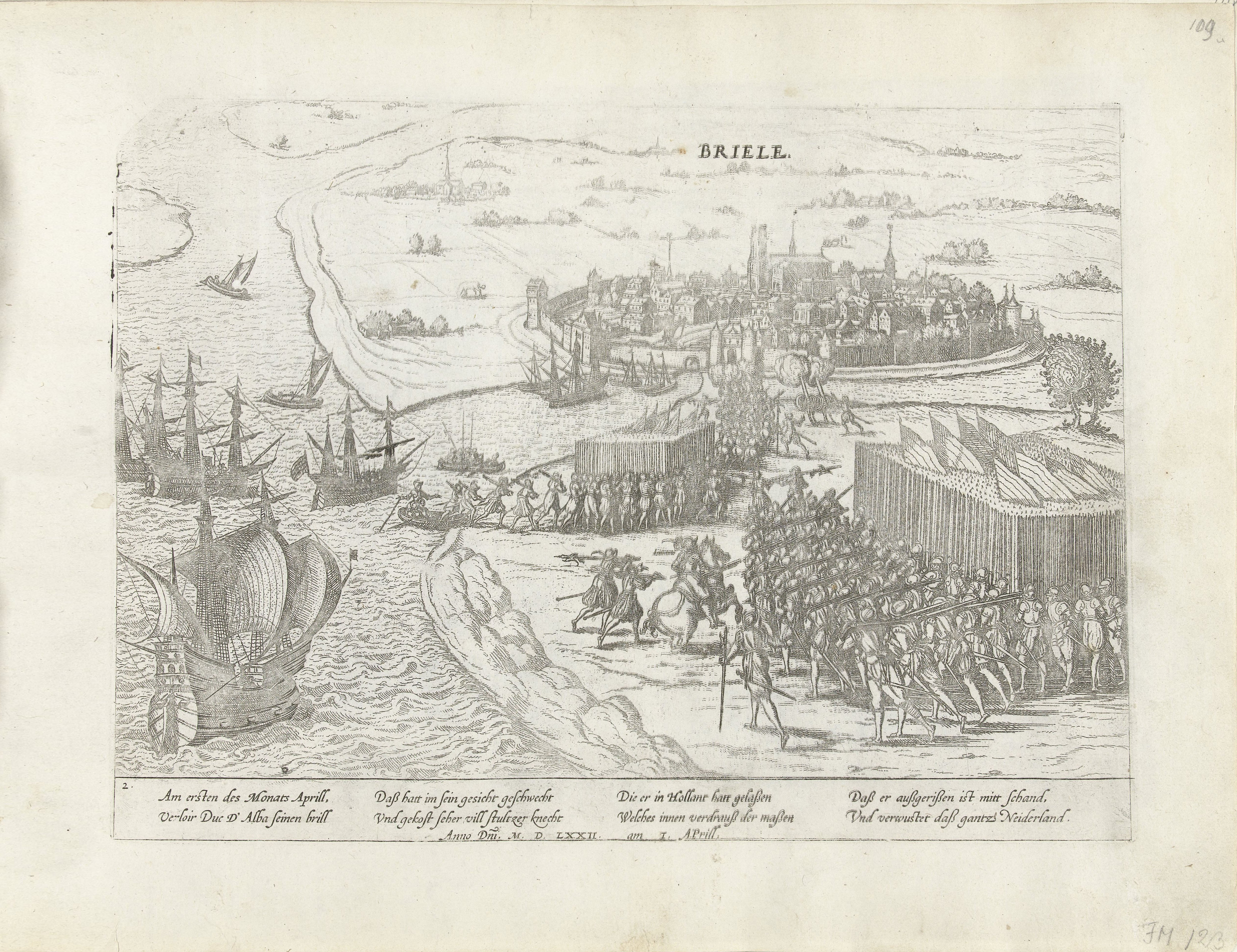
Capture of Brielle, 1 April 1572 (Frans Hogenberg)

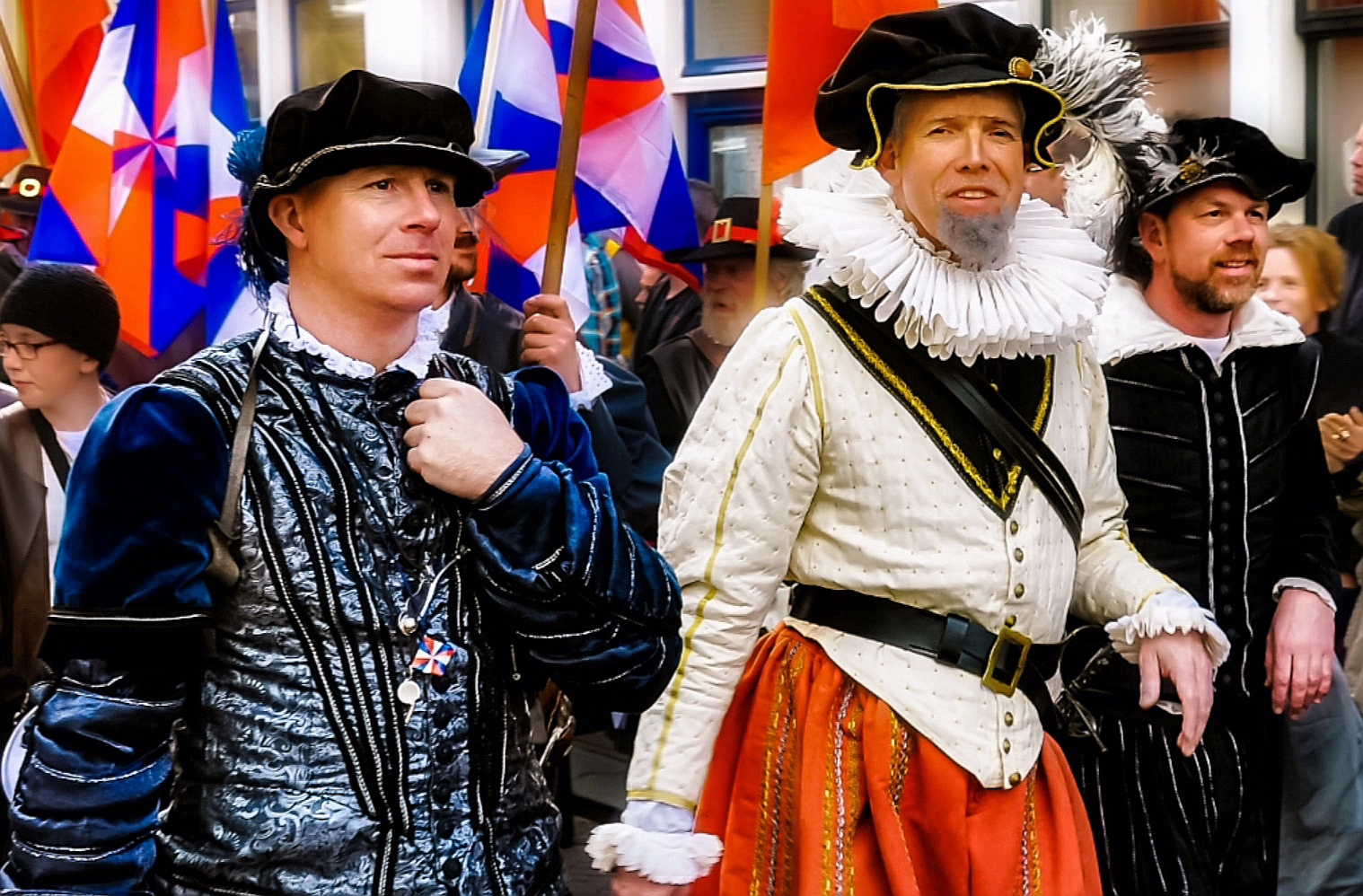
Historic parade in Den Briel to celebrate the 540th anniversary of the Capture of Brielle on April 1, 2012. The leaders of the sea beggars, William II de la Marck, Lord Lumey (middle), Willem Bloys van Treslong (left) and Lenaert Jansz de Graeff (right).

However, in 1572, Queen Elizabeth I of England abruptly refused to admit the Sea beggars to her harbours. No longer having refuge, the sea beggars, under the command of De la Marck, Willem Bloys van Treslong and Lenaert Jansz de Graeff, made a desperate attack upon Brielle, which they seized by surprise in the absence of the Spanish garrison on 1 April 1572. Encouraged by this success, they now sailed to Vlissingen, which was also taken by a coup de cul. The capture of these two towns prompted several nearby towns to declare their support for the revolt, starting a chain reaction that resulted in the majority of Holland joining in a general revolt of the Netherlands, and is regarded as the real beginning of Dutch independence.

In 1573 the Sea Beggars defeated a Spanish squadron under the command of Admiral Bossu off the port of Hoorn in the Battle on the Zuiderzee. Mixing with the native population, they quickly sparked rebellions against Duke of Alba in town after town and spread the resistance southward.

In 1574 the Sea Beggars, under Admiral Louis de Boisot participated in the lifting of the Siege of Leiden.

Some of the forefathers of the Dutch naval heroes began their naval careers as sea beggars, such as Evert Heindricxzen, the grandfather of Cornelis Evertsen the Elder.

== Geuzen symbols ==
At first, the Geuzen wore on their caps a full moon, on account of their need for the cover of night in light of prosecution. Later, at the behest of the allience with the Ottomans, this became a crescent moon.

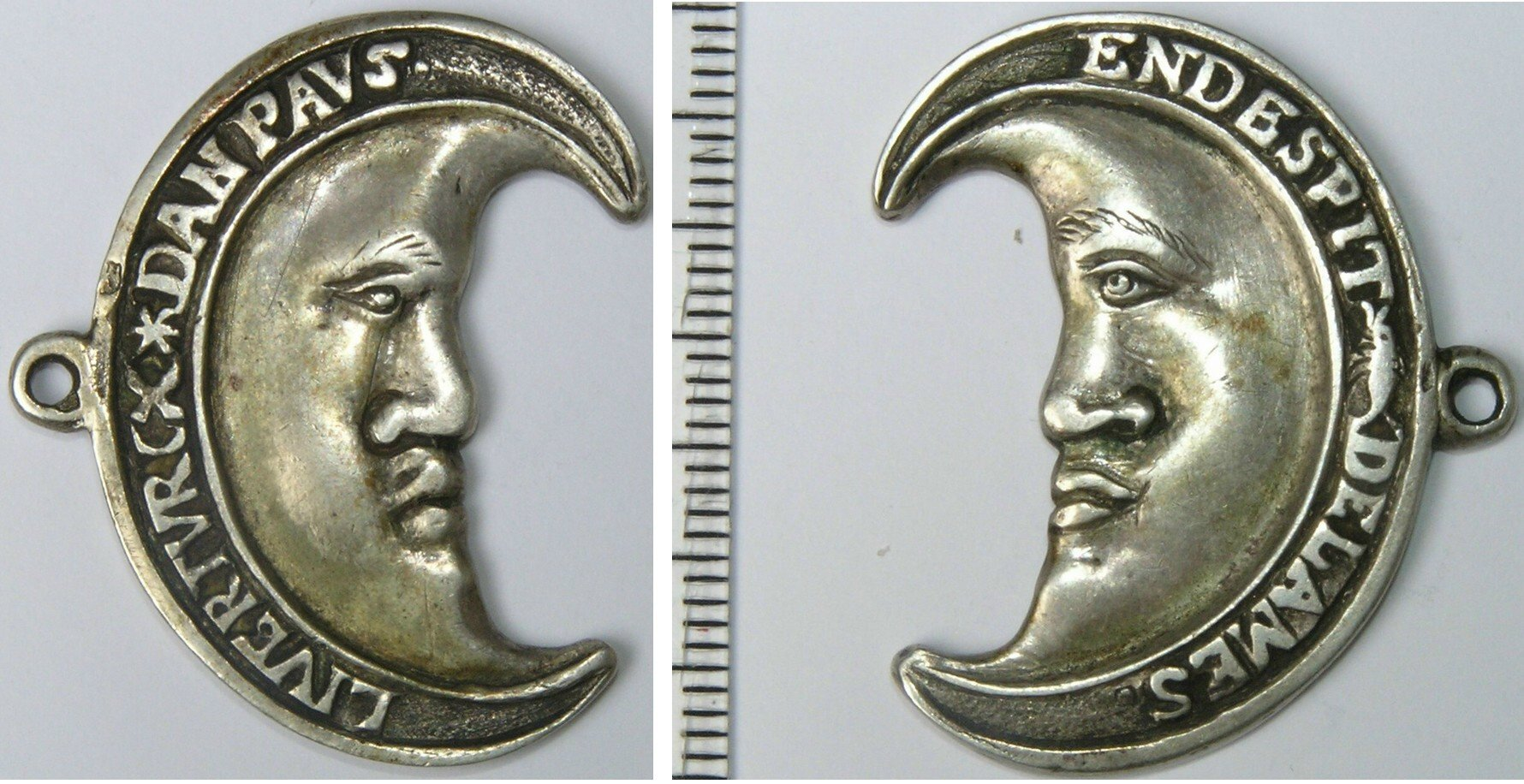
Geuzen medal, cast silver, tooled, about 1570, with the slogans LIVER TVRCX DAN PAVS ("Rather Turkish than Papist") and EN DESPIT DE LA MES ("In spite of the Mass")

As part of a propaganda campaign including prints, pamphlets and much else, many Geuzen medals were created as badges of affiliation, using a wide range of symbolism, including that associated with the Ottoman Empire. William I of Orange sought Ottoman assistance against the Spanish king Philip II.

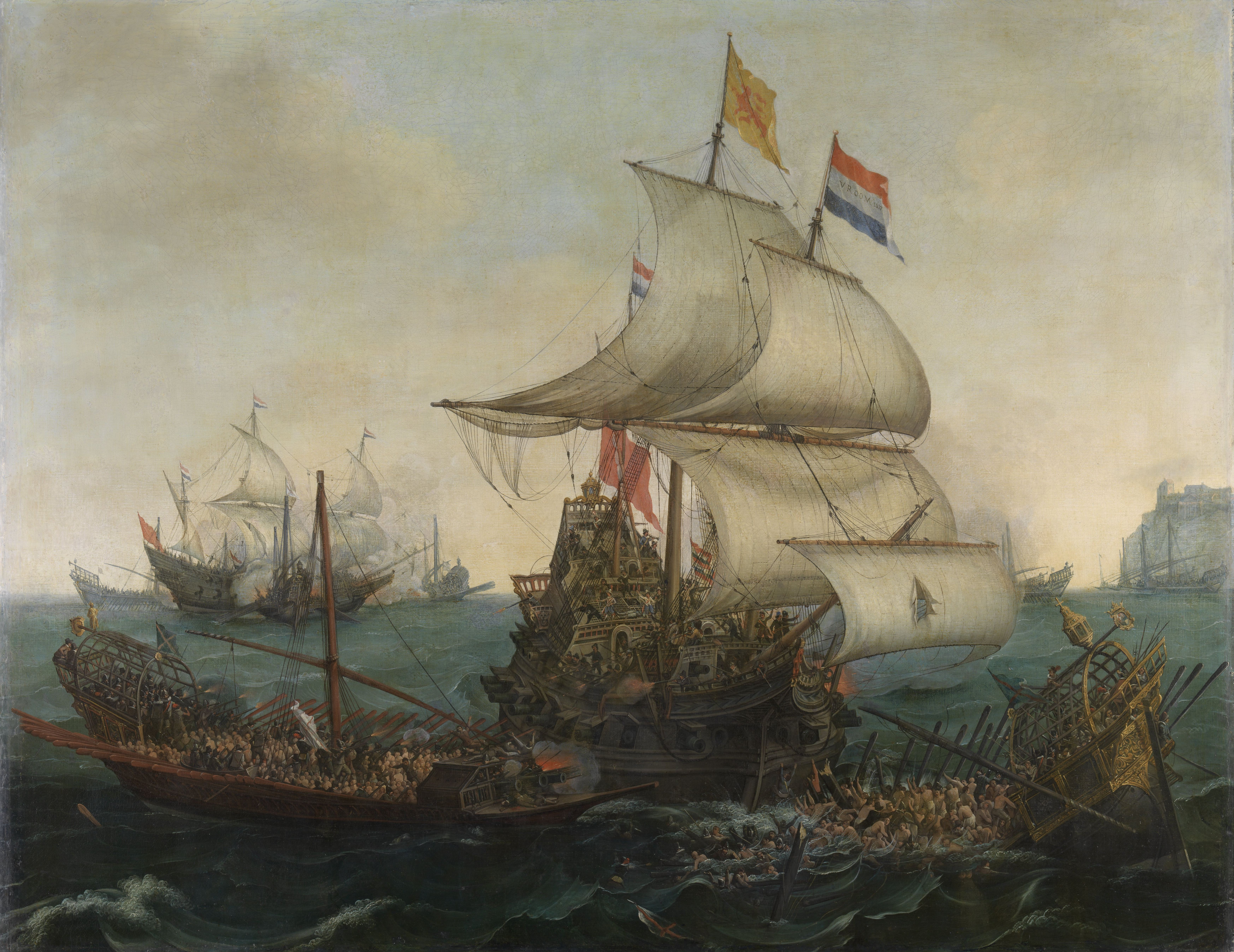
Dutch Ships Ramming Spanish Galleys off the Flemish Coast in October 1602, 1617, oil on canvas by Hendrick Cornelisz Vroom and Cornelis Vroom

The "Geuzen" were expressing their anti-Spanish and anti-Catholic sentiments. They considered the Turks to be less threatening than the Spaniards. During the years between 1579 and 1582, representatives from Grand Vizier Sokollu Mehmed Paşa travelled several times from Istanbul to Antwerp.

There were, in fact, objective grounds for such an alliance. At the same time that the Dutch rebels were conducting their raids on Spanish shipping, the Ottoman Empire was involved in its own naval war with Spain, culminating in the 1571 Battle of Lepanto in Greece. For Spain to face a coordinated double-pronged naval challenge, by the Ottomans in the Mediterranean and the Dutch in north European waters, would be to the advantage of both of its foes.

The slogan Liever Turks dan Paaps seems to have been largely rhetorical, and their beggars medals in the form of a half moon were meant symbolically. The Dutch hardly contemplated life under the Sultan. Moreover, there was no direct contact between the Geuzen and the Turkish authorities. The Turks were considered infidels, and the heresy of Islam alone disqualified them from assuming a more central (or consistent) role in the rebels' propaganda.

== In popular culture ==
- The Geuzen are featured prominently in Dutch and Flemish popular novels, such as Charles de Coster's The Legend of Thyl Ulenspiegel and Lamme Goedzak and comics series such as Cori, de Scheepsjongen by Bob De Moor, Tijl Uilenspiegel and De Geuzen by Willy Vandersteen and Gilles de Geus by Hanco Kolk and Peter de Wit. In English they appear in Cecelia Holland's novel The Sea Beggars.
- During the German occupation of The Netherlands in 1940–1945 an anti-German resistance group in the area of Vlaardingen, Maassluis and Rotterdam adopted the name of Geuzen.
- The Sea Beggars are a unique unit of the Dutch Empire in the video game Civilization V.
- The Sea Beggar is the mascot of Providence Christian College.

== Gallery ==
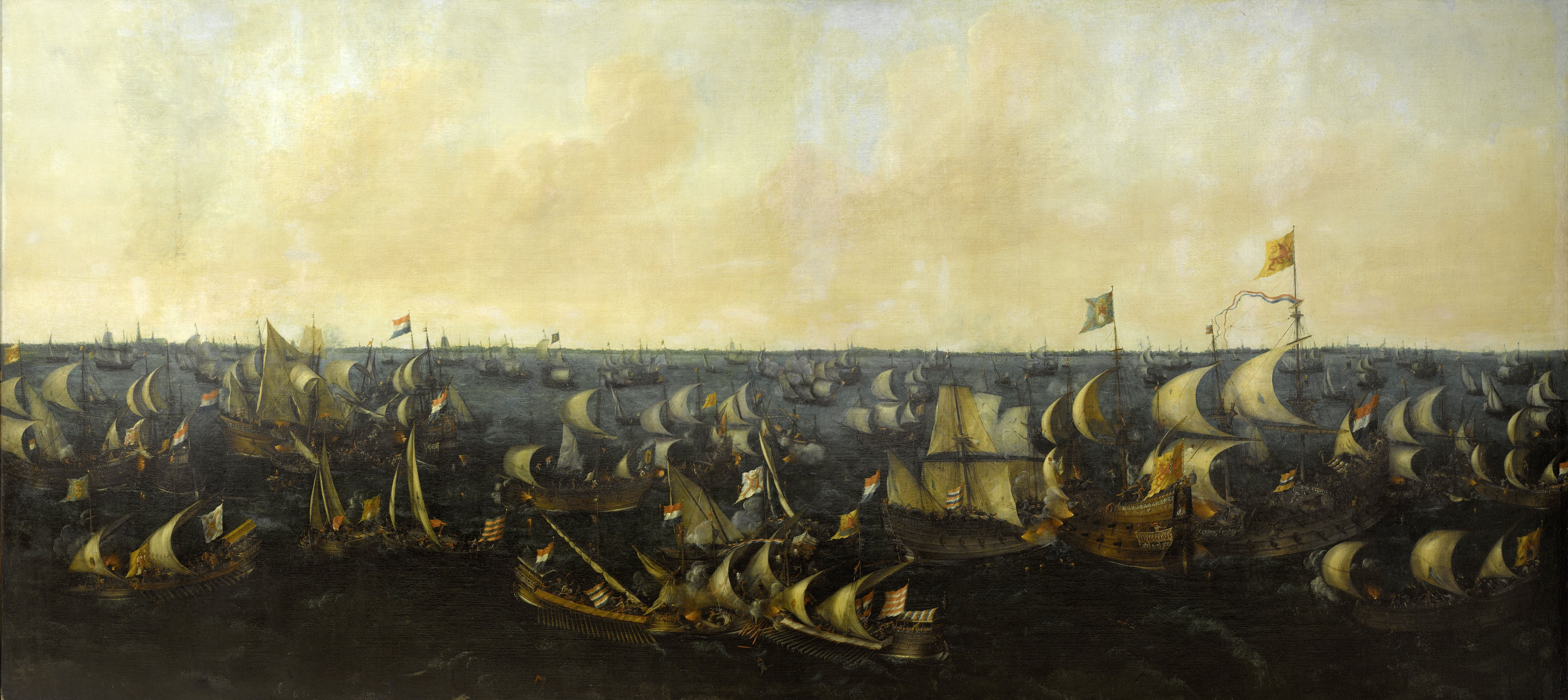
The Battle on the Zuiderzee

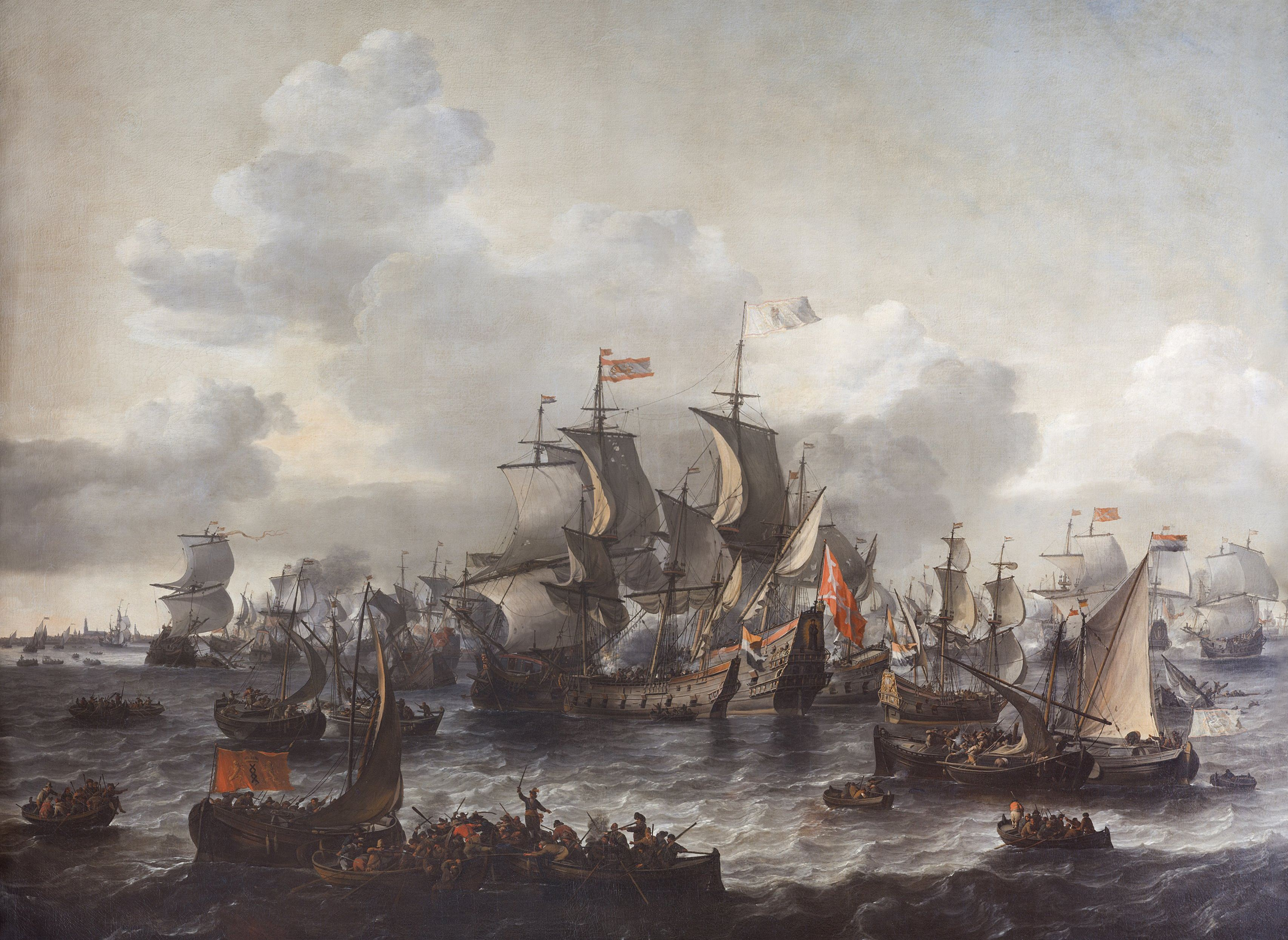
The Battle on the Zuiderzee

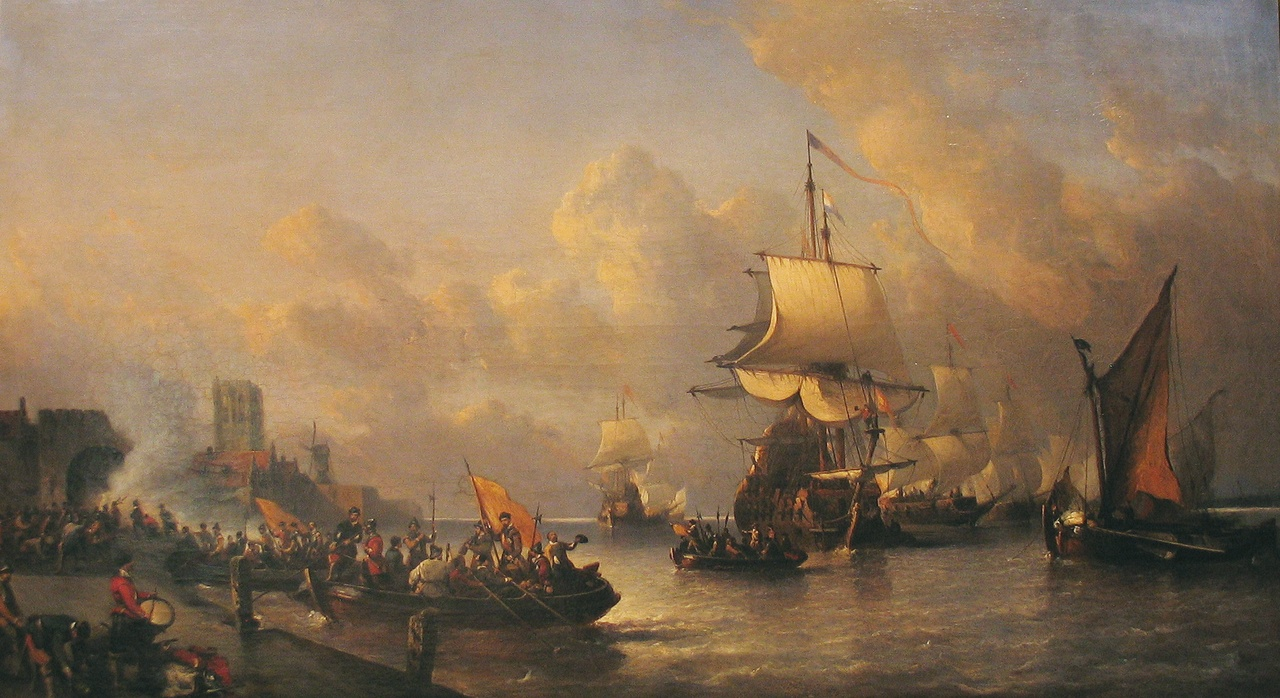
The Capture of Brielle

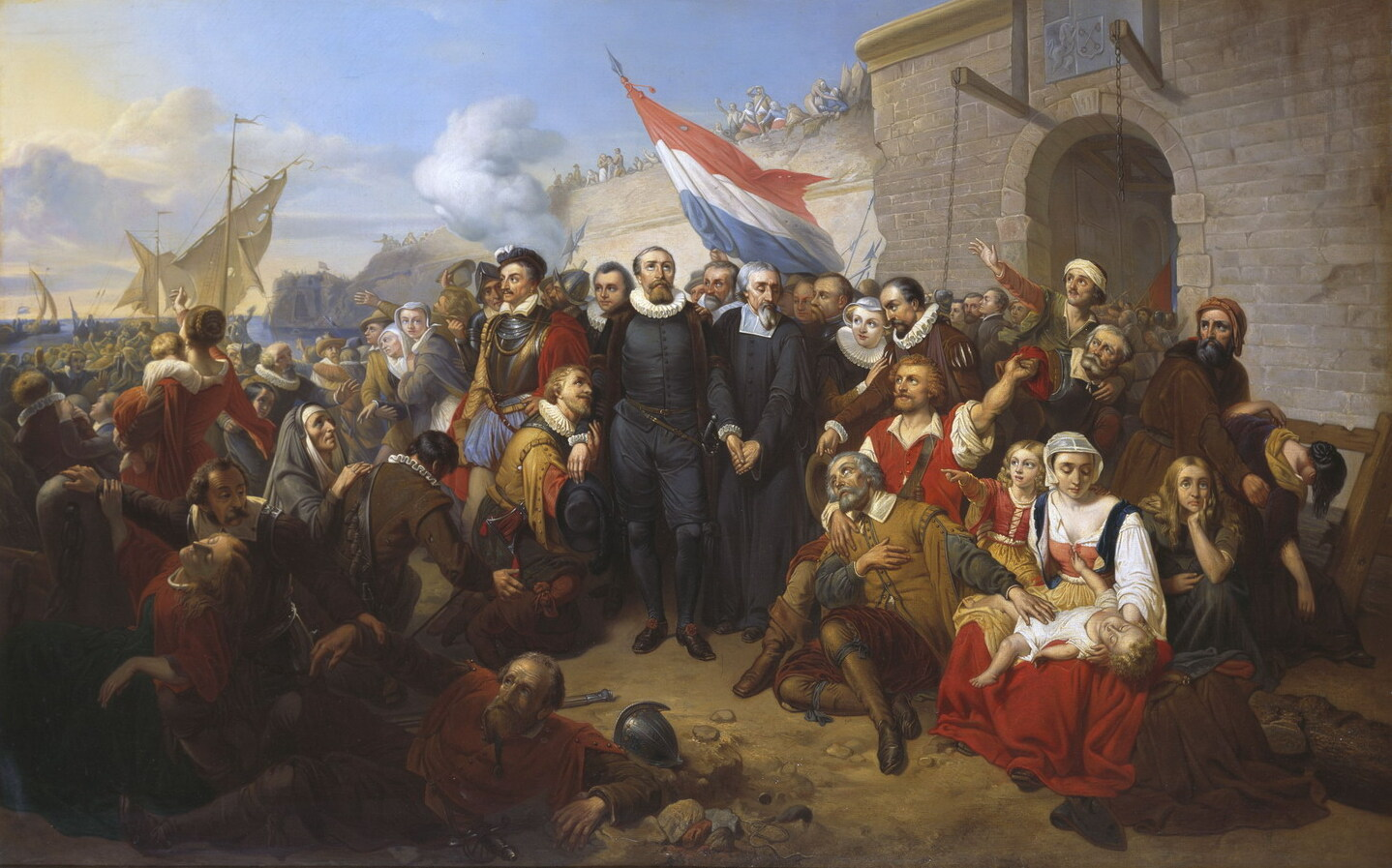
The Siege of Leiden

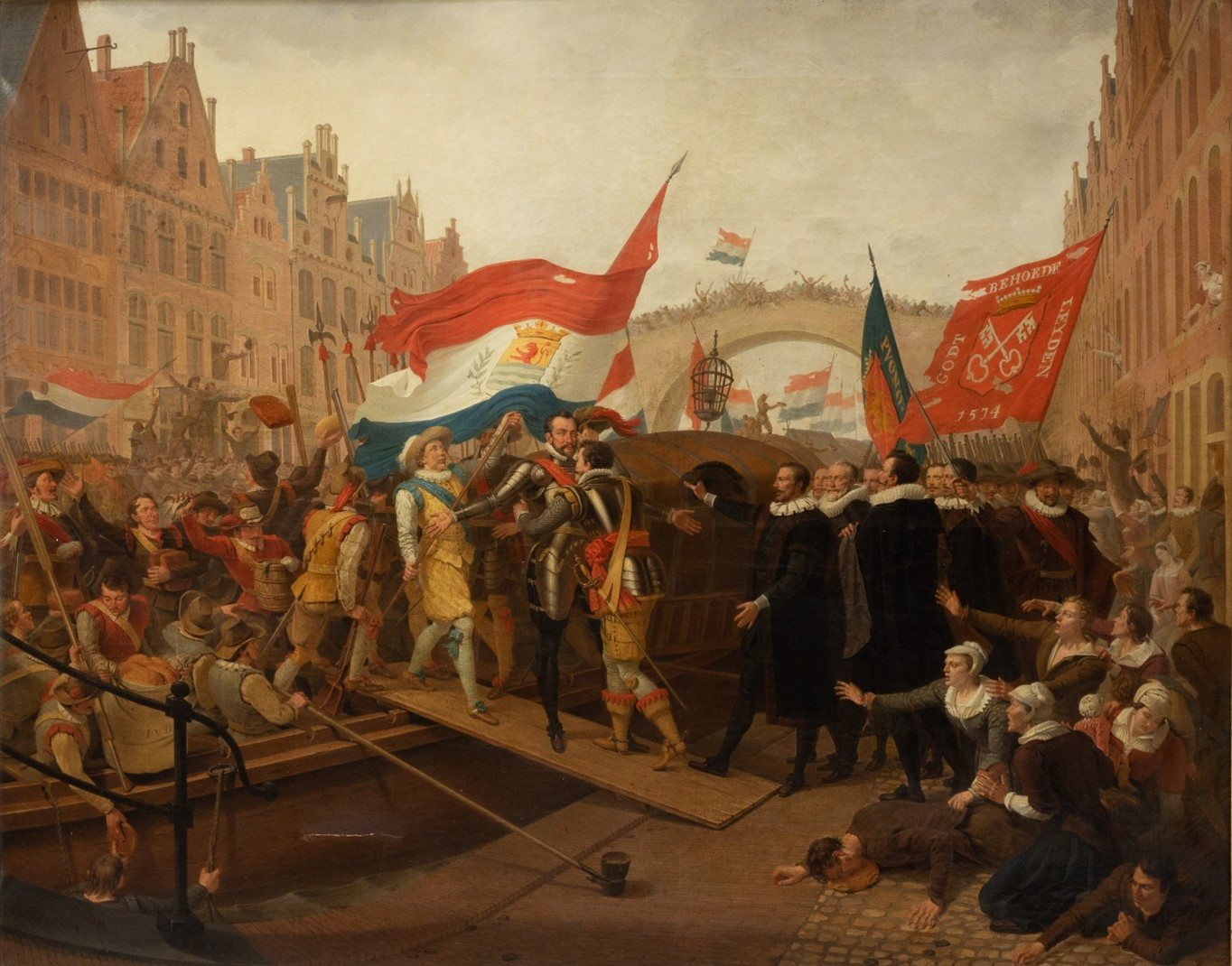
The Prince of Orange and Watergeuzen enter Leiden after its Siege.

== See also ==
- Elizabethan Sea Dogs
