= Eighty Years' War, 1572–1576 =

Second phase of the Eighty Years' War

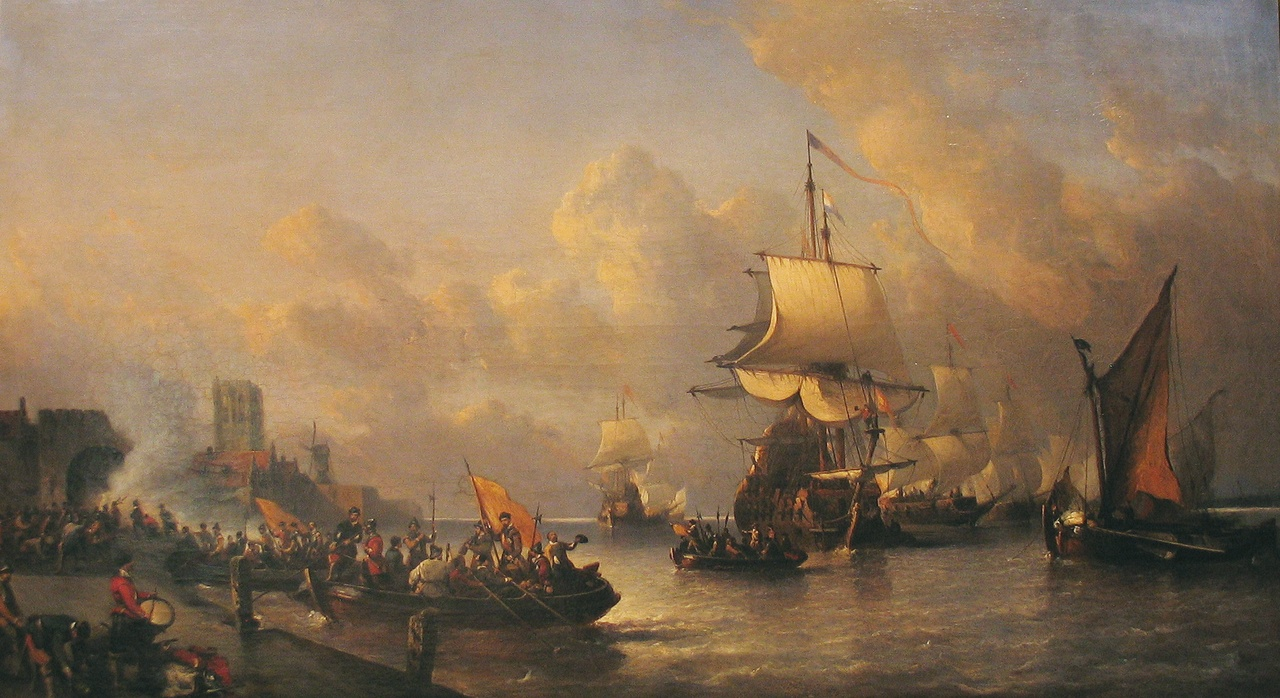
Capture of Brielle in 1572 by Anthonie Waldorp (1862)

The period between the Capture of Brielle (1 April 1572) and the Pacification of Ghent (8 November 1576) was an early stage of the Eighty Years' War (c. 1568–1648) between the Spanish Empire and groups of rebels in the Habsburg Netherlands.

After Watergeuzen (in English known as "Sea Beggars") seized several poorly defended towns and cities in Holland and Zeeland in April 1572, the exiled stadtholder William "the Silent" of Orange launched his second invasion of the Netherlands from the east in another attempt to generate a general uprising against the repressive regime of Spanish General-Governor Fernando Álvarez de Toledo, 3rd Duke of Alba. Acting on orders of Philip II of Spain, Alba sought to exterminate all manifestations of Protestantism and disobedience through inquisition and public executions, as well as abolishing several privileges of the Netherlandish nobility and autonomy of cities, and introducing more stringent taxes.

William's second invasion in 1572 had mixed results, and Alba's son Don Fadrique went on a lightning campaign to retake all towns occupied by Orangist and Geuzen troops in October 1572. Several towns (including Mechelen, Zutphen and Naarden) which refused to surrender were brutally sacked by Fadrique's forces in an attempt to intimidate others into resubmitting themselves to the royal government, culminating in the seven-month-long Siege of Haarlem before it was conquered and sacked in July 1573. By this point, the rebel territory had been reduced to most towns in Holland (notably excluding royalist Amsterdam) and Zeeland, and two towns in Guelders; knowing that violent repression would result from resistance, these cities resolved to fight to the bitter end, while the others capitulated. The Spanish offensive stalled after Haarlem, with the Dutch rebels capturing Geertruidenberg, winning the Siege of Alkmaar and Battle of Delft, and achieving naval superiority. Citing ill health, Alba resigned and returned to Spain in December 1573. During Alba's governorship, the total number of people killed in the Netherlands by executions, burnings, and massacres is estimated to have reached 50,000.

His successor Requesens was more conciliatory, but was unable to force or persuade many places back into governmental control, losing the Siege of Leiden (1573–1574). After his death in March 1576, exacerbated by Spain's state bankruptcy in November 1575, mutinies amongst the unpaid Spanish soldiers started spreading into what became known as the "Spanish Fury", plundering many towns and villages even in loyal territories of the Netherlands. Faced with the mutineer atrocities, particularly the Sack of Antwerp, all the provinces except Luxembourg made an alliance known as the Pacification of Ghent, rising in revolt in November 1576 to demand that Philip II withdraw all foreign troops from the Netherlands, suspend the persecution of Protestants, and consult the States-General in matters of local governance rather than rule by unilateral autocratic action.

== Historiography ==
Groenveld (2009) regarded 1572–1576 as one of the most violent periods of the Eighty Years' War. (Note: 'A first radical phase continued until 1575–1576, and found its violent peak in the years after 1572.') By contrast, the 1576–1579 phase represented 'three years of moderation'. Mulder et al. (2008) chose a different periodisation for the years 1572 to 1576: "Oppression and resistance, 1567–1573" and "The North on the way to autonomy, 1573–1588". For their chronology, the departure of Alba was a more significant turning point than the capture of Brielle. They also remarked: 'Alba has become the bogeyman in our [Dutch] national history. As for his taxation plans [this is] certainly unjustified. The hopelessly outdated beden had to be abolished urgently. [However,] his harsh treatment of rebels rightly earned him his nickname 'iron duke'.'

== Background ==
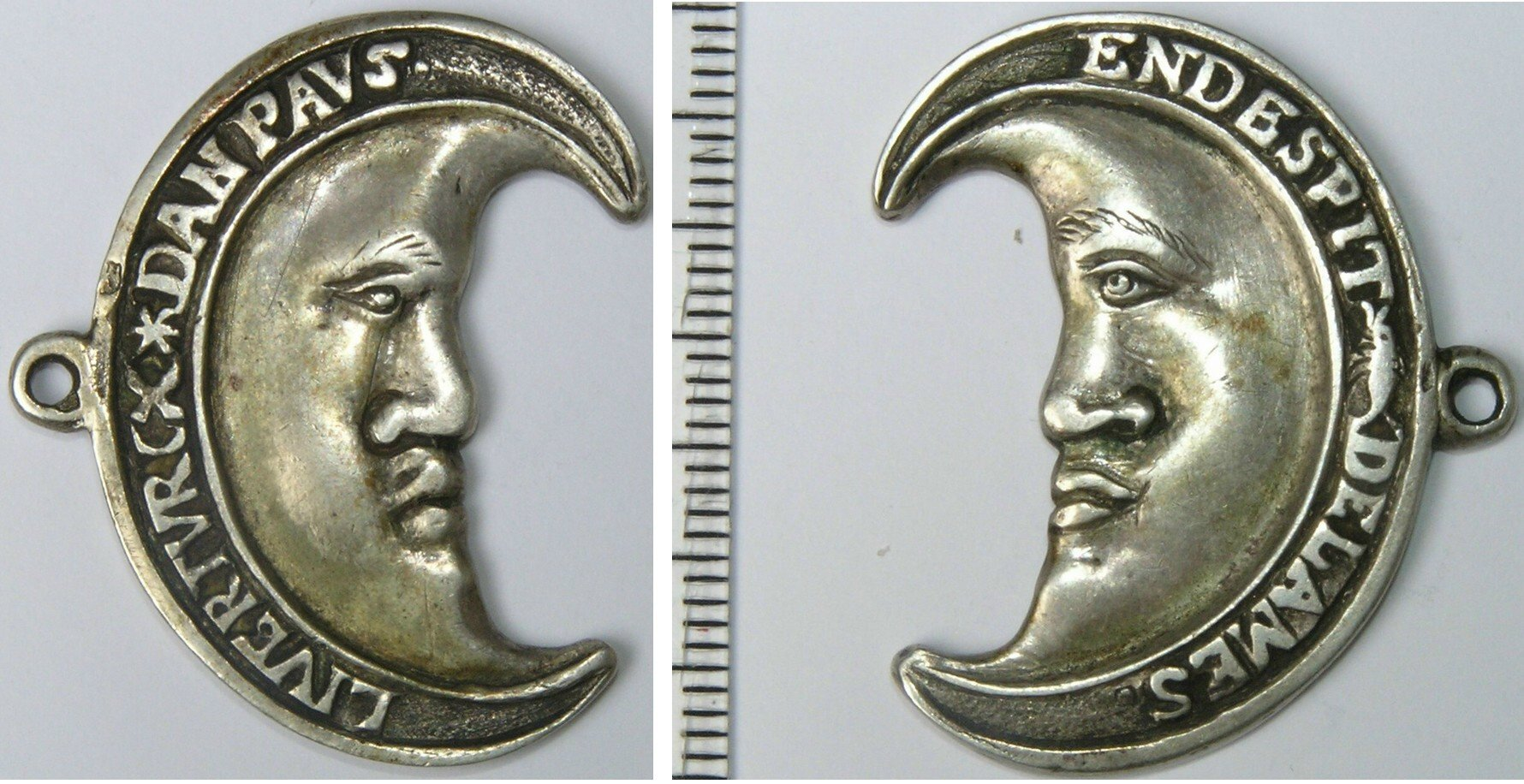
Crescent-shaped Geuzen medal, cast silver, tooled, about 1570, with the slogan "Liever Turks dan Paaps" ("Rather Turkish than Papist").

In the first stages of the War, the government had already succeeded in putting down the Beeldenstorm and several radical Calvinist insurrections in 1566–1567 (notably in Valenciennes, Tournai and Oosterweel), with Alba executing the leading opposition noblemen Egmont and Horne (who were Catholic) to intimidate the others, and defeating William of Orange's first invasion in 1568.

Spain was hampered because it was waging war on multiple fronts simultaneously, all of which cost money, equipment, troops and logistical support. Its struggle against the Ottoman Empire in the Mediterranean Sea put serious limits on the military power it could deploy against the rebels in the Netherlands. At the same time, Philip was also intervening in the French Wars of Religion. Finally, English privateers were harassing Spanish shipping and its colonies in the Atlantic. Even though Spanish treasure fleets were carrying massive riches from the American colonies filling the royal coffers, the extreme governmental expenses often exceeded even these enormous revenues.

The Ottoman sultan Suleiman the Magnificent (r. 1520–1566) claimed that he felt religiously close to the Protestants, "since they did not worship idols, believed in one God and fought against the Pope and Emperor". He generally supported Lutheranism and Calvinism, in 1552 specifically he sent a letter to the Protestant princes in Germany to incite them to rebel against the Pope and the Emperor, supported Calvinists in Hungary and Transylvania, and negotiated commercial treaties with Elizabeth I of England for the same reason, as a way to counter Habsburg attempts at supremacy in Europe, and in order to distract and weaken Catholic opposition to the Reformation. In 1566, diplomat Joseph Nasi contacted Protestants in Antwerp to discuss an Ottoman offer of assistance against the Spaniards. In 1569, William of Orange sent a secret envoy to Nasi asking the Ottomans to support the Dutch Revolt against their common Spanish enemies. According to a 1570 letter of encouragement to the "Lutheran group" (Luteran taifesi) in "Flanders and other Spanish provinces", which has been preserved in the archives of Feridun Ahmed Bey, the Ottoman sultan (at this point Selim II) promised the rebels in the Netherlands that he would send them troops whenever they were ready to rise up against Philip II.

Even so, by 1570 the Spanish had more or less suppressed the rebellion throughout the Netherlands. However, in March 1569, in an effort to finance his troops, Alba had proposed to the States that new taxes be introduced, among them the "Tenth Penny", a 1/10 levy on all sales other than landed property. This proposal was rejected by the States, and a compromise was subsequently agreed upon. Then, in 1571, Alba decided to press forward with the collection of the Tenth Penny regardless of the States' opposition. This measure aroused such strong protest that Alba relented, was satisfied with a ransom and moderated his proposals; the Tenth Penny was in fact almost never collected anywhere.

== Events and developments ==
=== Holland and Zeeland April–July 1572 ===
Geuzen and Orangist troop movements April–August 1572

With the threat of potential invasions from France, Alba concentrated his forces in the Southern Netherlands, in some cases removing troops from garrisons in the North. This left towns such as the port of Brielle (traditional English name: Brill; traditional Dutch name: Den Briel) almost undefended. On 1 March 1572, the English Queen Elizabeth I ousted the Watergeuzen from the English harbours in an attempt to appease the Spanish king. The Gueux under their leader Lumey then unexpectedly captured the almost undefended town of Brielle on 1 April 1572. An attempt by Count Boussu, the royalist stadtholder of Holland, to recapture the city failed. In securing Brielle, the rebels had gained a foothold, and more importantly a token victory in the north. This was a sign for Protestants across the Low Countries to rebel once more.

Flushing and Veere defected to the rebels on 3 May. Orange quickly responded to this new development, by sending a number of emissaries to Holland and Zeeland with commissions to take over local government on his behalf, in his old capacity of stadtholder, which he now re-assumed. Diederik Sonoy persuaded the cities of Enkhuizen, Hoorn, Medemblik, Edam, Haarlem, and Alkmaar to defect to Orange. The cities of Oudewater, Gouda, Gorinchem, and Dordrecht yielded to Lumey. Leiden declared itself for Orange in a spontaneous revolt. The States of Holland, with a rebel majority, (Note: In the States of Holland 18 cities and the Ridderschap (College of Nobles) each had one vote. So ten cities constituted a majority.) convened in the rebel city of Dordrecht, and by 18 July, only the important cities of Amsterdam (until 1578) and Schoonhoven openly remained loyalist. Rotterdam went to the rebels soon after the first meetings in Dordrecht. Delft remained neutral for the time being.

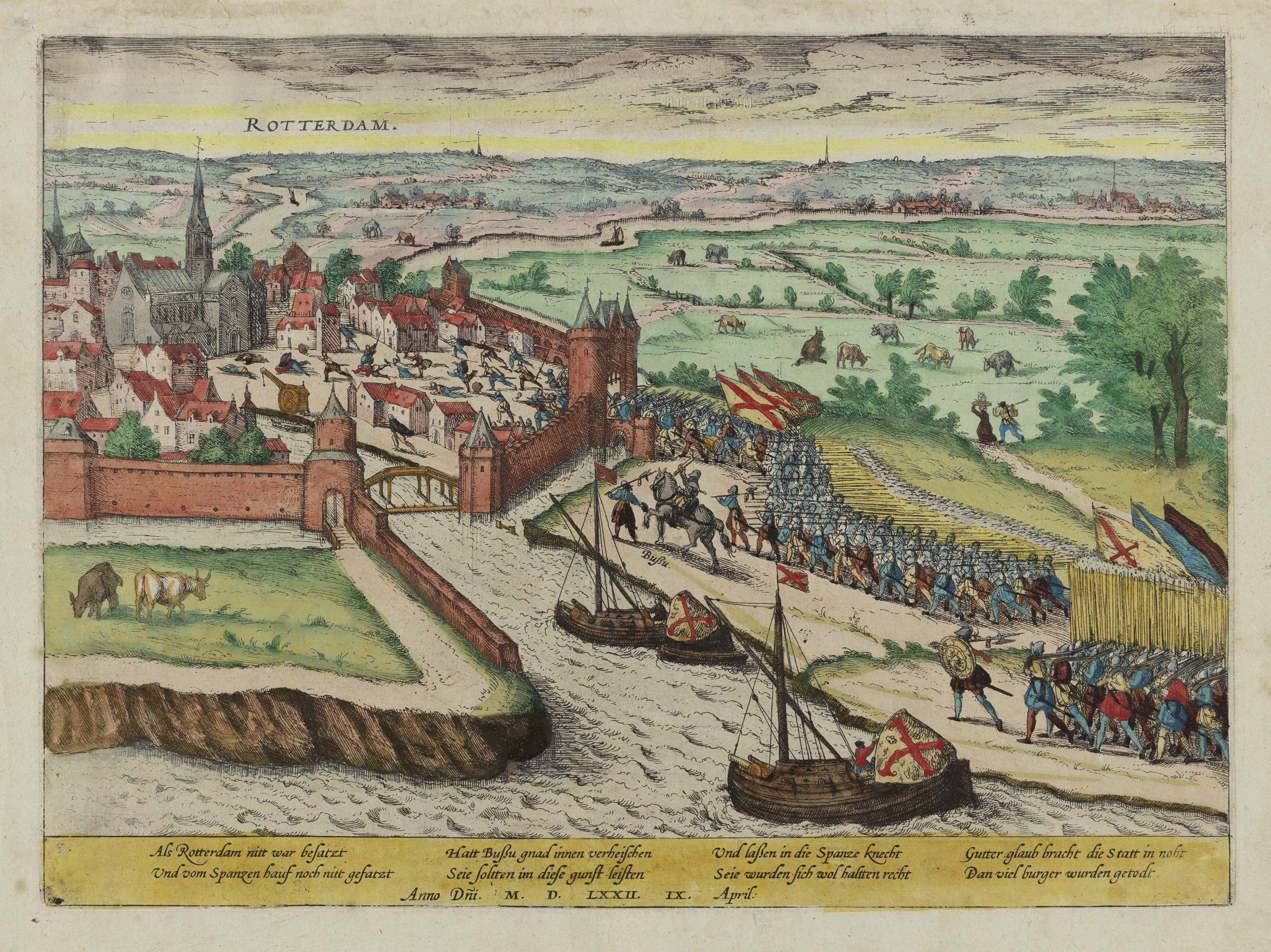
Capture of Rotterdam by Spanish soldiers led by Count Bossu, 9 April 1572

In Zeeland, the capital city of Middelburg also remained loyal, but was put under siege by the Geuzen from April 1572 until February 1574, when Middelburg surrendered to the rebels. Orange was recognised as stadtholder of Holland, Zeeland, and Utrecht at an unauthorised meeting of the States of Holland in Dordrecht in July 1572. Orange also asked for a formal alliance between himself and the States of Holland, rather than just being the king's representative and the States being the people's representatives. Calvinism was granted the status of 'public religion', even though less than 10% of the population was Calvinist at the time.

=== William's second invasion ===
Count Willem IV van den Bergh, William of Orange's brother-in-law, captured the city of Zutphen, followed by other cities in Gelderland and neighbouring Overijssel. In Friesland rebels had seized several cities. The royalist stadtholder Caspar de Robles sacked Dokkum in reprisal, killing many citizens (Walloon Fury in Dokkum). Louis of Nassau captured Mons by surprise on 24 May, but on 21 June Alba started besieging the city. William marched to Mons to support him, but a Spanish night raid on his camp forced Orange to withdraw through Mechelen, where he left a garrison. A French Huguenot army seeking to relieve Louis at Mons was also defeated in the Battle of Saint-Ghislain (17 July 1572) by Spanish forces under Philip of Noircarmes and Don Fadrique. Moreover, in the night of 23–24 August 1572, the St. Bartholomew's Day massacre was committed against the Huguenot leaders in Paris, crushing any remaining hopes of Calvinist reinforcements from the south. Louis surrendered Mons on 19 September on the condition of an honourable withdrawal. On the other hand, Alba had troops sack Mechelen on 2 October, after which towns in the southern Netherlands hastened to pledge renewed loyalty to Alba.

=== Don Fadrique's campaign ===
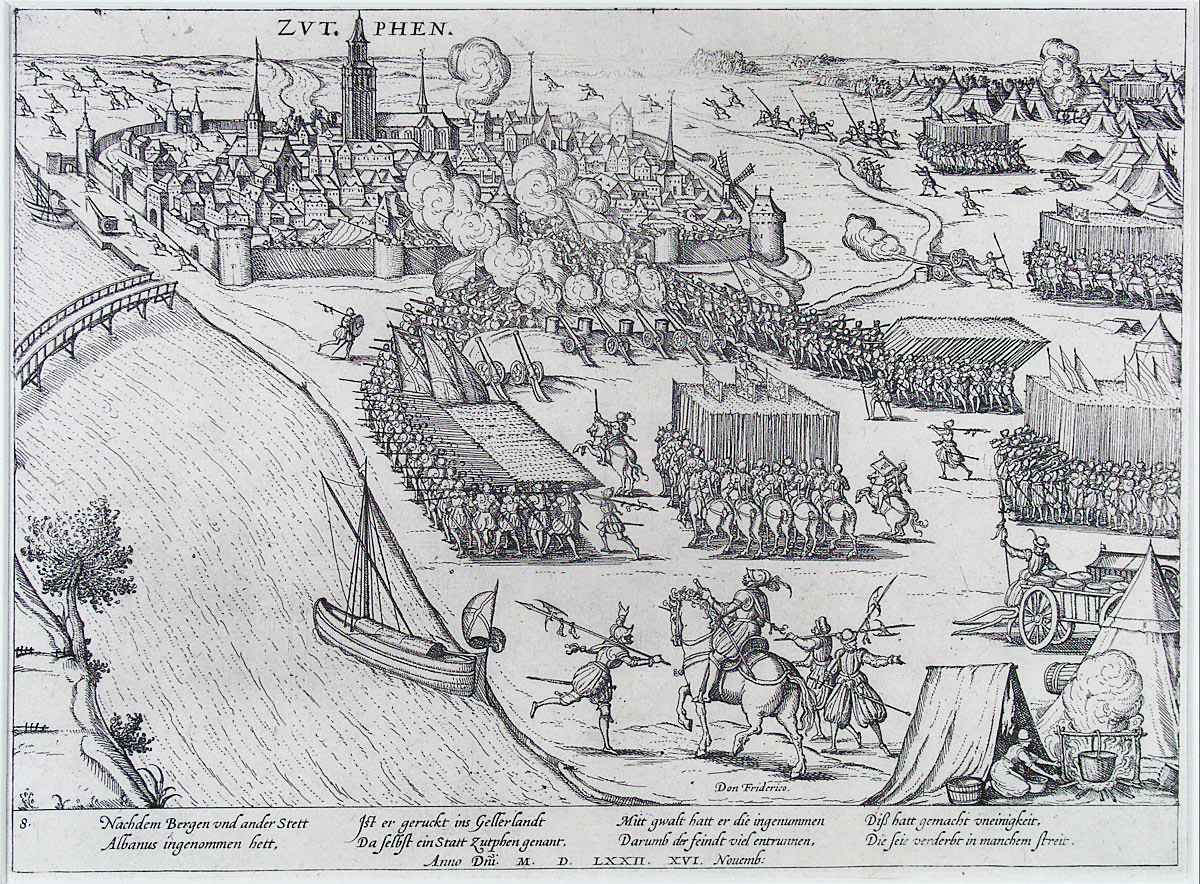
Zutphen taken by Fadrique Álvarez de Toledo on 16 October 1572

After dealing with William of Orange's threat in the South, Alba sent his son Fadrique to subdue rebel strongholds in Gelderland and Holland. Fadrique started his campaign by sacking the fortress city of Zutphen in Gelderland. Hundreds of citizens perished, and immediately many rebellious cities in Gelderland, Overijssel and Friesland yielded in order to avoid a similar fate. On his way to Amsterdam, Fadrique came across Naarden, which surrendered on 22 November 1572; and to set another example, Fadrique herded all of Naarden's citizens (reportedly including a Roman Catholic priest) into their church, which was subsequently set on fire. All 3,000 citizens perished in this massacre of Naarden. However, this galvanised the resistance of the rebellious cities, as they realised that surrender would not help them. It prompted the garrison of Haarlem to hold out until 13 July 1573, when starvation finally forced it to surrender.

=== Siege of Haarlem ===
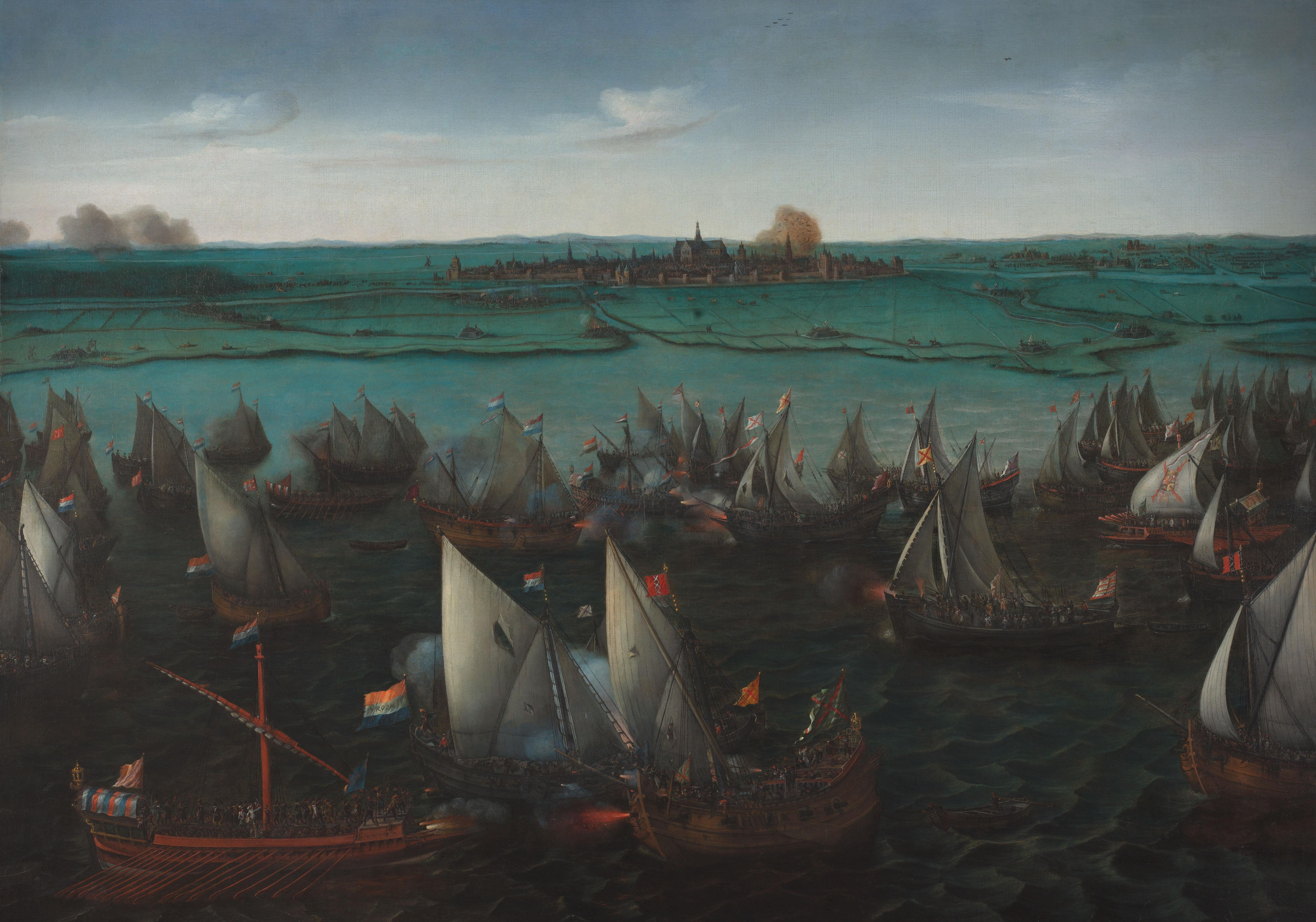
Battle of Haarlemmermeer (1573), by Hendrick Cornelisz, 1621. Vroom, oil on canvas

Next, Fadrique approached the city of Haarlem by way of the dike road along the IJ river and the Haarlem lake, then still a large inland lake. The city had recently been reinforced with mercenary troops in the pay of the Rebel States of Holland. When Fadrique laid siege in early December, the city council secretly tried to capitulate, but the citizens, aware of the fate of Naarden, prevented this and the defenders put up a resistance. Several attempts of rebel mercenary forces, sent by Lumey and William of Orange to relieve the city, were repelled by the besiegers. Meanwhile, Fadrique's siege artillery repeatedly reduced sections of the city's curtain wall to rubble, and repeatedly the defenders filled these breaches with makeshift ramparts during the following nights. They made good use of their fire-arms in repelling two Spanish attempts to take the city by storm in December 1572 and January 1573.

Starving the defenders therefore seemed the only way to success. During the winter months, when the waterways were frozen over, the city was adequately supplied with sleds crossing the ice. However, when thaw set in Fadrique was the first to use the weapon of inundation. He had the IJ dike cut, which allowed Amsterdam war galleys to bring in men to build an important earthwork to neutralize a pesky Haarlem bastion, called theVijg, that was successfully defended by Walloon and Scottish mercenaries. To counter this move, William brought together a fleet of a hundred lake vessels manned with volunteers in April. This naval attempt was, however, beaten back and Haarlem was effectively cut off. An overland attempt with a large force of rebel volunteers was ambushed by the besiegers with large loss of life on the rebel side in July. Haarlem, near starvation, therefore surrendered on terms on 13 July, buying off a sack with a large indemnity. The denial of their well-deserved sack of the city prompted Fadrique's soldiers to stage a month-long mutiny to protest their arrears in pay, during which they amused themselves with drowning hapless garrison members in the Spaarne river, though they left the citizens alone.

=== Rebel victories in 1573 ===
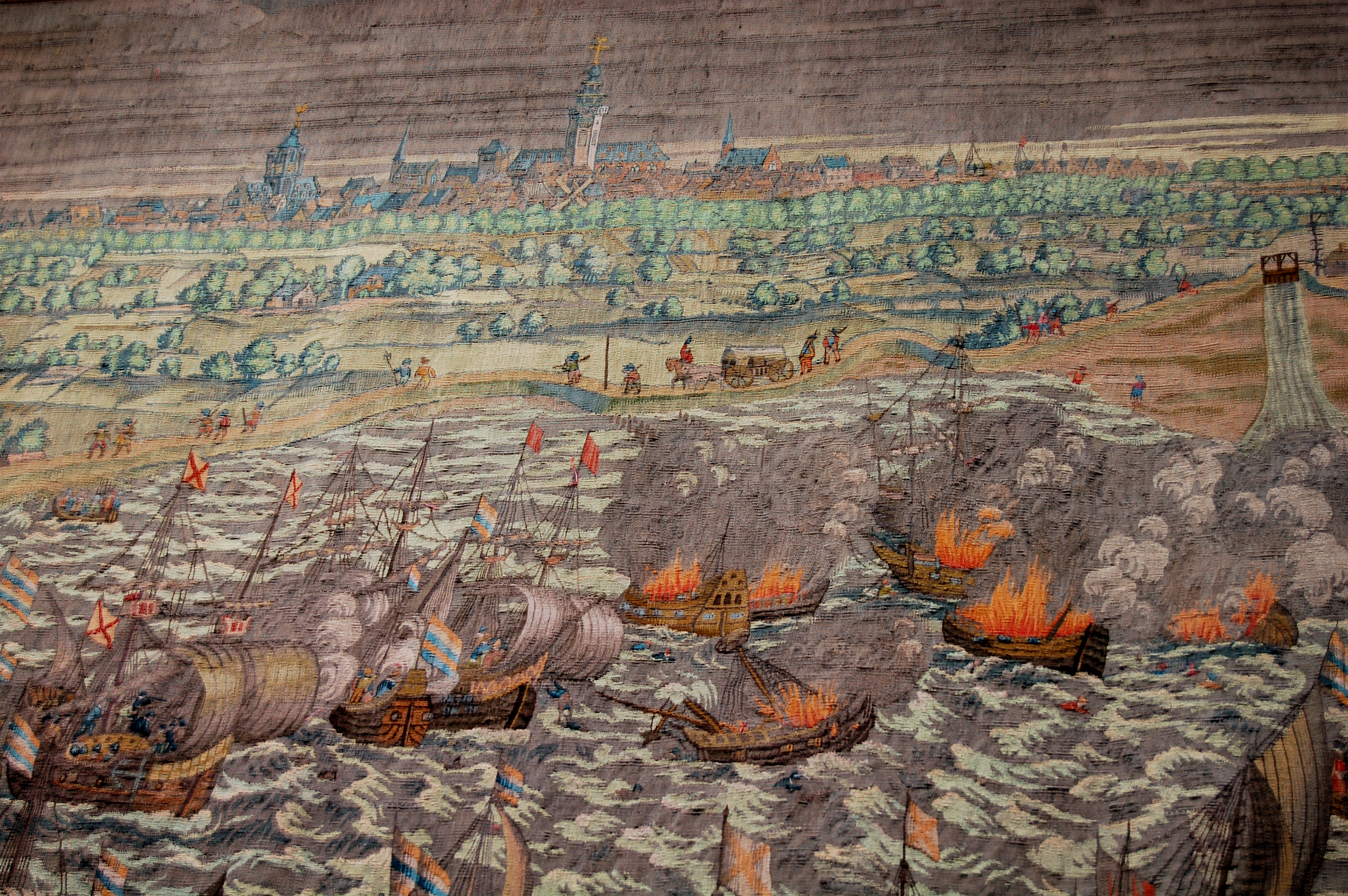
The Battle of Rammekens between the Spanish and the Sea Beggar fleet in 1573

While the loss of Haarlem was a severe blow to the rebel cause, the siege gave the rebels time to improve their defenses. The subsequent siege of Alkmaar resulted in a rebel victory after the sluice gates were opened and the area surrounding the city was flooded, making a further siege impossible. The city of Geertruidenberg was captured in a night-time surprise attack by an English, French Huguenot and Flemish force on 28 August, and in October a Spanish attempt to take Delft and its environs failed, which further boosted the morale of the rebels.

In the Battle on the Zuiderzee on 11 October 1573, a Sea Beggar squadron defeated the royalist fleet, led by Count Boussu, thus placing the Zuiderzee under rebel control. A blockade against the royalist city of Amsterdam was established. The ensuing battles of Borsele and Reimerswaal established naval superiority for the rebels in Zeeland, and led to the fall of Middelburg in February 1574, which had been besieged by the rebels since April 1572.

=== Leiden and Mookerheyde (1574) ===
In November, Fadrique started the Siege of Leiden. The first stage of the siege ended in March 1574, when the Spanish troops had to deal with a mercenary force led by Orange's brothers Louis and Henry of Nassau-Dillenburg. They engaged the Spanish troops at Mookerheyde, which ended in a clear Spanish victory. The second stage of the siege of Leiden started in May. The polders surrounding Leiden were flooded and a Sea Beggar fleet managed to lift the siege on 2 October 1572. (Note: The inundation served its purpose, but at tremendous cost to the civilian population, as it took about seven years for things to return to normal. This did not escape Alba's notice, who seems to have considered the possibility of permanently inundating the entire province of Holland. The project was vetoed by king Philip II, however.)

=== Bankruptcy and Spanish Fury 1575–1576 ===
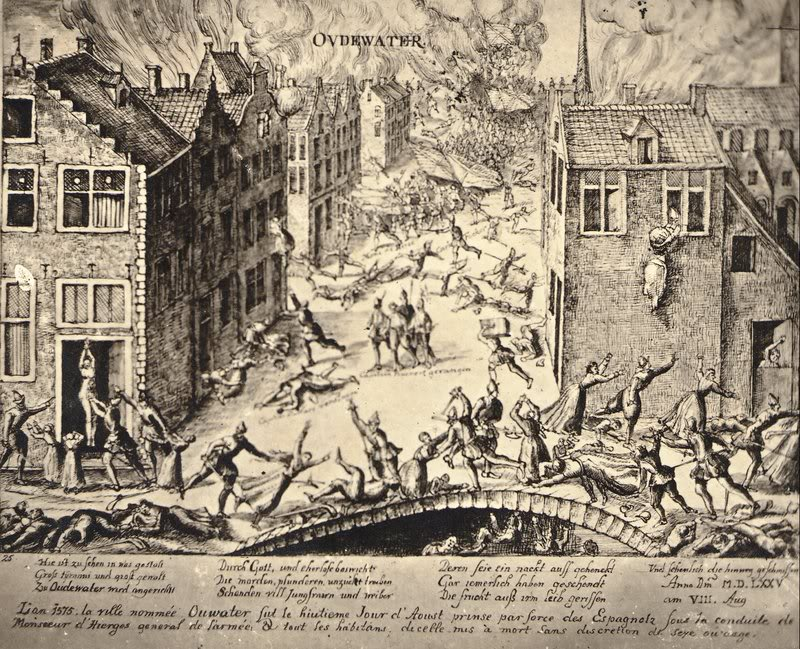
Oudewater was conquered by the Spanish on 7 August 1575, and most of its inhabitants were killed.

Gilles de Berlaymont, lord of Hierges, the last royalist stadtholder of Holland, captured and sacked Schoonhoven and Oudewater in August 1575. In the summer of 1575, Requesens ordered Cristobal de Mondragon to attack the Zeelandic city of Zierikzee, which surrendered on 2 July 1576; however, the Spanish troops mutinied and left Zierikzee. Philip had not been able to pay his troops for two years, since he defaulted on all government debts in September 1575 and his creditors did not extend further credit. (Note: Parker (2004) mentions that Spain had to default on its loans in 1560 (after a war with France), 1575, 1596, 1607, 1627, 1647 and 1653, every time putting the war effort in jeopardy; the 1575 default led directly to the 1576 mutiny of foreign troops in the Army of Flanders.) Spanish mutineers marched on Brussels, on the way committing the Sack of Aalst (25 July 1576), and using Aalst as a base of operations for further plundering.

The loyal provinces had reluctantly backed the royal government against the Rebellion so far, but now a loyal city had been sacked. After the death of Requesens, the States of Brabant raised their own troops to protect Brussels. Nevertheless, the Brabantian forces were defeated by a mutinous Spanish force in the Battle of Vissenaken (14 September 1576). Soon after, the Spanish Fury of Maastricht (20 October 1576) saw even more Spanish mutineers plunder a city, and kill many civilians. To prevent further atrocities in their province, the States of Flanders decided to besiege the Spanjaardenkasteel (15 September – 11 November 1576), a castle in Ghent with a Spanish garrison threatening mutiny.

On 4 November 1576, the "Spanish Fury" culminated in the Sack of Antwerp; Spanish mutineers went on a murderous and pillaging rampage through the city that had up to that point been the most prosperous of the Low Countries. Shocked by the atrocities in Antwerp and elsewhere, the loyal provinces sought contact with the rebels. Philippe de Croÿ, Duke of Aarschot, took over government and allowed the States-General to start peace negotiations with the States of Holland and Zeeland in the city of Ghent, where sixteen out of the Seventeen Provinces concluded the Pacification of Ghent (8 November 1576).

== Role of Holland geography ==
The County of Holland is one of the few inhabited areas in the world to be located primarily below sea level, although the sea is only a serious threat during severe hurricanes when the tides reach extraordinary heights. (Note: Cf. St. Elizabeth's flood (1404), St. Elizabeth's flood (1421), North Sea flood of 1953) In normal circumstances; the real danger comes from above: the low-lying areas have difficulty draining precipitation. In the 16th century, when the technology to efficiently drain those areas were still lacking, Holland was covered with extensive shallow lakes, while the slightly higher land in between consisted of waterlogged bogs, which made it difficult terrain for an army to manoeuvre in. In practice, a marching army had to use the elevated dike roads along waterways to get around in this landscape, and these narrow venues were easy to choke off by a determined enemy. Both royalist and rebel forces, therefore, made extensive use of sconces to deny their opponents freedom of movement.

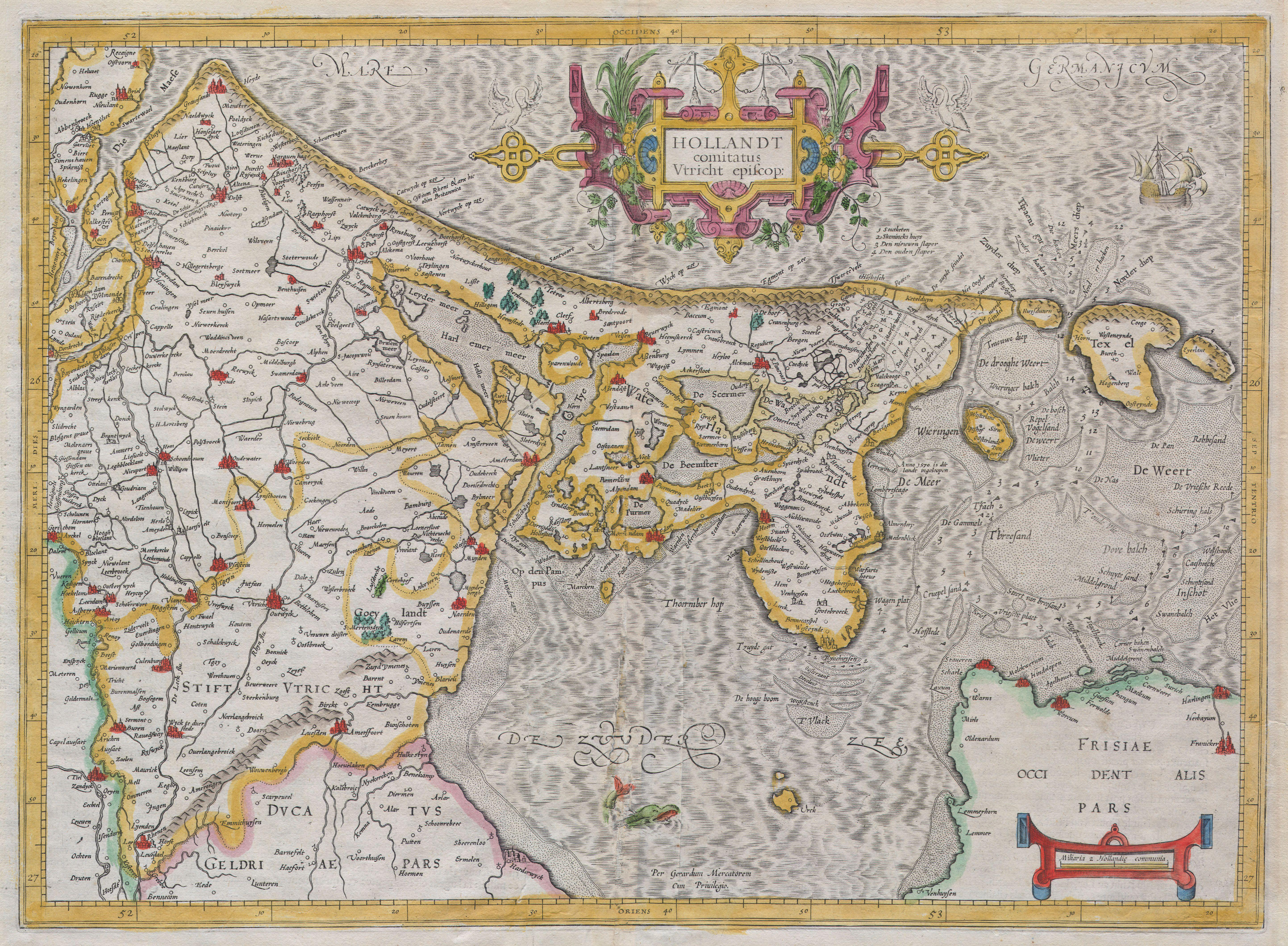
A map of Holland in 1606 by Gerardus Mercator. It featured many lakes, especially in the northern region of the province. (Note: Unlike the modern convention of compass-North, the top of this Mercator map is pointing West.)

On the other hand, though an obstacle to a land army, a watercourse may be a transport route for one equipped with shallow-draft vessels. Both sides, therefore, tried to use watercraft to circumvent each other, often while at the same time blocking the other side with new water impediments. In this war, the rebel side did not passively accept the terrain, but actively tried to change it dynamically by inundating large areas. This was possible, because the area has many subdivisions of varying depth (so-called polders), surrounded by dikes that enabled the inhabitants to manage the water table. Breaching a dike would theoretically allow water from higher areas to fill up adjoining lower areas. In practice, much depended on the time of year, as the water was lacking in summer, and the prevailing wind's direction often frustrated attempts to inundate areas speedily.

16th-century Holland was already highly urbanised, with approximately 500,000 inhabitants living in towns and cities. The cities were generally walled, but in 1572, the fortifications were of the old-fashioned medieval variety, with curtain walls that were vulnerable to siege artillery. The architecture of the trace italienne had not yet penetrated Holland as it would soon. Cities had their civic militias, but these were mainly used to keep order and were of dubious value in a military conflict, like a siege. However, the Dutch militias already used a relatively high number of firearms, more so than the Spanish infantry that still mainly relied on pikemen. As the surrounding countryside was more suited to dairy farming (and hence cheese production) than wheat growing, Hollandic cities already heavily relied on foreign trade for their food supply, particularly on Baltic grain (the moedernegotie or "mother of all trade"). This made the cities vulnerable to sieges and starvation tactics. (Note: Cf. Economic history of the Dutch Republic)

== Bibliography ==
- Bulut, Mehmet (2001). Ottoman-Dutch Economic Relations in the Early Modern Period 1571–1699. Hilversum: Uitgeverij Verloren. p. 240. ISBN 9789065506559.
- Groenveld, Simon (2009). Unie – Bestand – Vrede. Drie fundamentele wetten van de Republiek der Verenigde Nederlanden. Hilversum: Uitgeverij Verloren. p. 200. ISBN 9789087041274. (in cooperation with H.L.Ph. Leeuwenberg and H.B. van der Weel)
- Israel, Jonathan (1995). The Dutch Republic: Its Rise, Greatness, and Fall 1477–1806. Oxford: Clarendon Press. ISBN 0-19-873072-1.
- Kamen, Henry (2005). Spain, 1469–1714: a society of conflict (3rd ed.). Harlow, United Kingdom: Pearson Education. ISBN 0-582-78464-6.
- Koenigsberger, Helmut G. (2007). Monarchies, States Generals and Parliaments. The Netherlands in the fifteenth and sixteenth centurie. Cambridge University Press. ISBN 978-0-521-04437-0. [2001] paperback
- Karpat, Kemal H. (1974). The Ottoman State and Its Place in World History: Introduction. Leiden: Brill. p. 53. ISBN 9789004039452.
- Kossmann, Ernst; Mellink, A. F. (1974). "1. Introduction". Texts concerning the Revolt of the Netherlands. Cambridge: Cambridge University Press. pp. 1–50. ISBN 0-521-200148.
- van der Lem, Anton (1995). "Het verhaal van de Opstand. Hoofdstuk 3: De trouw beproefd 1567–1573". De Opstand in de Nederlanden (1555–1648) (in Dutch). Uitgeverij Kosmos / Leiden University.
- Limm, Peter (1989). The Dutch Revolt, 1559–1648 (1st ed.). London, UK: Longman. p. 154.
- Miller, Roland E. (2006). Muslims and the Gospel: Bridging the Gap. Minneapolis, Minnesota: Lutheran University Press. p. 208. ISBN 9781932688078.
- Mulder, Liek; Doedens, Anne; Kortlever, Yolande (2008). Geschiedenis van Nederland, van prehistorie tot heden. Baarn: HBuitgevers. p. 288. ISBN 9789055746262.
- Parker, Geoffrey (2004). The Army of Flanders and the Spanish Road 1567–1659. Second edition. Cambridge University Press. ISBN 978-0-521-54392-7. paperback
- Tracy, J.D. (2008). The Founding of the Dutch Republic: War, Finance, and Politics in Holland 1572–1588. Oxford University Press. ISBN 978-0-19-920911-8.
