= List of stadtholders in the Low Countries =

This is a list of stadtholders (Dutch: stadhouders, German: Statthalter) or governors (French: gouverneurs) in the Low Countries, or historical Netherlands region. This includes all the territories in the Low Countries that were acquired by the House of Habsburg in the 15th and 16th centuries and were politically united as the Habsburg Netherlands, then known as the "Seventeen Provinces". It also includes non-Habsburg territories, such as the Prince-Bishopric of Liège (until 1794), the Princely Abbey of Stavelot-Malmedy (until 1794), the Prince-Bishopric of Cambrésis and the Imperial City of Cambray (until 1678), the Principality of Sedan (until 1651), the Duchy of Bouillon (until 1795), and the Duchy of Jülich (until 1795).

== Background ==
The stadtholders or governors were appointed from the ranks of the high nobility, and acted as deputies of a monarch, such as the dukes of Burgundy, Saxony and Guelders, the kings of Spain, or the archdukes of Austria. During the Eighty Years' War, the States(-General) of provinces that rebelled against the Spanish crown started appointing their own stadtholders, establishing a symbiotic relationship between States and stadtholders in what would become the Dutch Republic. Throughout the war, some areas had two stadtholders: those appointed by the Habsburgs and those appointed by the States in revolt.

== By territory ==
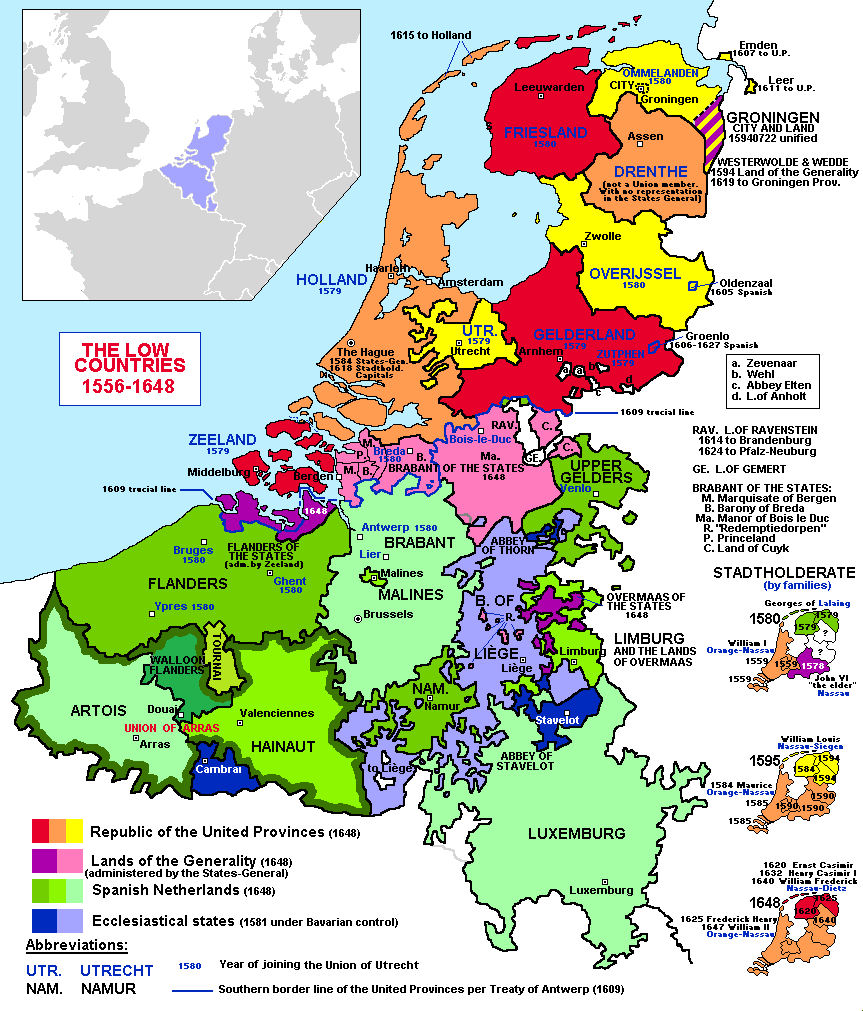
Map of the Low Countries between 1566 and 1648. Territories in blue were ecclesiastical lands not part of the Habsburg Netherlands (Seventeen Provinces).

=== County of Artois ===
The County of Artois (Dutch: Artesië) was a province of France, held by the Dukes of Burgundy from 1384 until 1477/1482, and a state of the Holy Roman Empire from 1493 until 1659. Through the Burgundian treaty of 1548, it was made part of the Habsburg Netherlands (Seventeen Provinces) until 1659, when it was reincorportated into France.

==== In Habsburg service ====
- 1500–1504: Engelbert II of Nassau, count of Nassau-Breda
- 1506–1513: James II of Luxemburg-Fiennes, lord of Fiennes
- 15??–1524: Ferry of Croÿ, lord van Roeulx
- 1524–1553: Adrian of Croÿ, count of Roeulx
- 1553–1558: Pontus of Lalaing, lord of Bugnicourt
- 1559–1568: Lamoral, Count of Egmont, Prince of Gavre
- 1568–1571: none (?)
- 1571–1578: Ferdinand of Lannoy, duke of Bojano
- 1578–1579: Gillis van Berlaymont, lord of Hierges
- 1579–1597: Florent de Berlaymont, count of Lalaing and Berlaymont
- 1597–1610: Charles III de Croÿ, Prince de Chimay
- 1610–1624: Lamoral, Prince of Ligne

=== Duchy of Brabant ===
The Duchy of Brabant had no stadtholder, since the governor-general administered this region directly from Brussels. William the Silent once proposed to appoint a kind of stadtholder (he called it superintendent) to be able to persuade the States of Brabant to obey, because without the stadtholder, the States could act too independently. He implied that he himself would be a good candidate for the office. However, his proposal was rejected by Antoine Perrenot de Granvelle. At the Entry of William the Silent to Brussels in September 1577, William did receive the medieval title of ruwaard from the hands of the States of Brabant, which came down to a stadtholdership, but mainly had symbolic value.

=== Prince-Bishopric of Cambrai ===
Although the Prince-Bishopric of Cambrai (Dutch: Kamerijk) or Cambrésis was not formally part of the Habsburg Netherlands but was sovereign and directly under the emperor, the emperor was also always from the House of Habsburg, and the city of Cambrai had had a Spanish garrison as its occupation since 1543. The Spanish Habsburgs therefore appointed governors (stadtholders) over Cambrai who were not answerable to the prince-bishop residing in Le Cateau-Cambrésis.

==== In Habsburg service ====
- 1566–1574: Philip of Noircarmes
- 1574–1576: Philip of Récourt, baron of Licques (Liques), viscount of Lens. Taken captive and deposed by Baudouin de Gavre in 1576.

==== In States-General service ====
- 1576–1581: Baudouin de Gavre, lord of Inchy, conquered Cambrai and was appointed commander/governor/stadtholder of Cambrai in the service of the States-General.
- 1589: Cambrai conquered by the French.

==== In French service ====
- 1594–1595: Jean de Moltluc, lord of Balagny (on behalf of the king of France)
- 1595: Siege of Cambrai (1595), Balagny capitulated on 9 October 1595 and the city fell back into Spanish hands.

==== In Habsburg service ====
- 1617–1630: Carlos Coloma, previously governor of Roussillon (1600–1611) and viceroy of Mallorca (1611–1617)
- 1630–16??: Juan Carlos de Guzman, Marquis of Fuentès
- Siege of Cambrai (1677): French forces took control of Cambrai. By the 1678–1679 Treaties of Nijmegen, France annexed Cambrésis.

==== In French service ====
- 168?–168?: François de Montbion
- 1741–1750?: Lodewijk Pieter Engelbert van der Marck.

=== County of Drenthe ===
==== In Habsburg service ====
- 1536–1540: Georg Schenck van Toutenburg
- 1540–1548: Maximiliaan van Egmond
- 1549–1568: Jean de Ligne, count of Arenberg
- 1568–1572: Charles de Brimeu, count of Megen
- 1572–1574: Gillis van Berlaymont
- 1574–1576: Gaspar de Robles, lord of Billy
- 1576–1580: none; province in States-General control
- 1580–1581: George de Lalaing, Count of Rennenberg
- 1581–1594: Francisco Verdugo
- 1595–1618: Frederik van den Bergh, in name only.

==== In States-General service ====
- 1576–1580: George de Lalaing, Count of Rennenberg
- 1580–1584: William the Silent, prince of Orange (de facto)
- 1584–1596: gnone; province in Spanish control
- 1593/1596–1620: William Louis of Nassau-Dillenburg
- 1620–1625: Maurice, Prince of Orange
- 1625–1632: Ernest Casimir, Count of Nassau-Dietz
- 1632–1640: Henry Casimir I of Nassau-Dietz
- 1640–1647: Frederick Henry, Prince of Orange
- 1647–1650: William II, Prince of Orange
- 1650–1664: William Frederick, Prince of Nassau-Dietz
- 1664–1696: Henry Casimir II, Prince of Nassau-Dietz
- 1696–1702: William III of England
- 1702–1722: Second Stadtholderless Period
- 1722–1751: William IV, Prince of Orange
- 1751–1795: William V, Prince of Orange

=== County of Flanders ===
==== In Habsburg service ====
- 1490–1506: Engelbert II of Nassau, count of Nassau-Breda
- 1506–1513: James II of Luxemburg-Fiennes, lord of Fiennes
- 1513–1517: ?
- 1517–1532: James II of Luxemburg-Fiennes, lord of Fiennes
- 1532–1540: Stadtholderless period (office temporarily suspended due to concerns of political power)
- 1540–1553: Adrian of Croÿ, count of Rœulx
- 1553–1558: Pontus of Lalaing, lord of Bugnicourt
- 1559–1568: Lamoral, Count of Egmont, prince of Gavre
- 1568–1572: none (?)
- 1572–1577: Jean de Croÿ, Count of Rœulx
- 1577–1584: none (?); province in States-General control (Calvinist Republic of Ghent).

==== In States-General service ====
- 1577: Philippe III de Croÿ, duke of Aarschot
- 1577–1583: none (?); province in States-General control (Calvinist Republic of Ghent)
- 1583–1584: Charles III de Croÿ, Prince de Chimay, duke of Aarschot.

=== Lordship of Frisia ===
- 1515–1518: Floris van Egmont, Count of Buren
- 1518–1521: Wilhelm von Roggendorf
- 1522: Jancko Douwama, Frisian rebel
- 1521–1540: Georg Schenck van Toutenburg
- 1548–1559: Maximiliaan van Egmond, Count of Buren
- 1559–1568: Jean de Ligne
- 1568–1572: Charles de Brimeu, Count of Megen
- 1572–1574: Gillis van Berlaymont, Lord of Hierges
- 1574–1576: Gaspar de Robles
- 1576–1581: George de Lalaing, Count of Rennenberg, in the service of Philip II of Spain
- 1581–1594: Francisco Verdugo, in the service of Philip II
- 1580–1584: William I, Prince of Orange
- 1584–1620: William Louis, Count of Nassau-Dillenburg
- 1620–1632: Ernest Casimir I of Nassau-Dietz
- 1632–1640: Henry Casimir I of Nassau-Dietz
- 1640–1664: William Frederick, Prince of Nassau-Dietz
- 1664–1696: Henry Casimir II of Nassau-Dietz
- 1696–1711: John William Friso, Prince of Orange
- 1711–1747: William IV, Prince of Orange

=== Lordship of Groningen ===
- 1519–1522: Cristoffel van Meurs
- 1522–1530: Jasper van Marwijck
- 1530–1536: Charles of Guelders
- 1536: Ludolf Coenders
- 1536–1540: Georg Schenck van Toutenburg
- 1540–1548: Maximiliaan van Egmond
- 1549–1568: Jean de Ligne
- 1568–1572: Charles de Brimeu
- 1572–1574: Gillis van Berlaymont
- 1574–1576: Gaspar de Robles
- 1576–1581: George de Lalaing, Count of Rennenberg
- 1581–1594: Francisco Verdugo
- 1594–1620: William Louis, Count of Nassau-Dillenburg
- 1620–1625: Maurice, Prince of Orange
- 1625–1632: Ernest Casimir, Count of Nassau-Dietz
- 1632–1640: Henry Casimir I of Nassau-Dietz
- 1640–1647: Frederick Henry, Prince of Orange
- 1647–1650: William II, Prince of Orange
- 1650–1664: William Frederick, Prince of Nassau-Dietz
- 1664–1673: Albertine Agnes of Nassau, regentess for Hendrick Casimir II
- 1664–1696: Henry Casimir II, Prince of Nassau-Dietz
- 1696–1707: Henriette Amalie of Anhalt-Dessau, regentess for John William Friso
- 1696–1711: John William Friso, Prince of Orange
- 1711–1729: Marie Louise of Hesse-Kassel, regentess for William IV, Prince of Orange
- 1711–1747: William IV, Prince of Orange

=== Duchy of Guelders ===
- 1473–1475: William IV of Egmont
- 1475–1476: William V of Egmont
- 1474–1477: Philip I of Croÿ-Chimay
- 1480–1481: William V of Egmont
- 1481–1492: Adolf III of Nassau-Wiesbaden-Idstein
- 1492–1504: Guelders independent
- 1504–1505: John V, Count of Nassau-Siegen
- 1505–1507: Philip of Burgundy
- 1507–1511: Floris van Egmond
- 1511–1543: Guelders independent
- 1543–1544: René of Châlon
- 1544–1555: Philip de Lalaing
- 1555–1560: Philip de Montmorency
- 1560–1572: Karel van Brimeu
- 1572–1577: Gillis van Berlaymont
- 1578–1581: Johann VI, Count of Nassau-Dillenburg
- 1581–1585: William IV of Bergh
- 1585–1587: Claude de Berlaymont
- 1587–1626: Florent de Berlaymont
- 1584–1589: Adolf van Nieuwenaar
- 1590–1625: Maurice, Prince of Orange
- 1625–1647: Frederick Henry, Prince of Orange
- 1647–1650: William II, Prince of Orange
- 1650–1675: First Stadtholderless Period
- 1675–1702: William III, Prince of Orange
- 1702–1722: Second Stadtholderless Period
- 1722–1747: William IV, Prince of Orange

==== Upper Guelders ====
- 1502–1522: Reinier of Guelders
- 1522–1543: Occupation by the Habsburgs
- 1543–1579: No stadtholder
- 1579–1589: Jan van Argenteau
- 1589–1592: Marcus de Rye de la Palud
- 1592–1593: Charles de Ligne, 2nd Prince of Arenberg
- 1593–1611: Herman van den Bergh
- 1611–1618: Frederik van den Bergh
- 1618–1632: Hendrik van den Bergh
- 1632–1637: Occupation by the Dutch Republic
- 1640–1646: Guillaume de Bette, 1st Marquess of Lede
- 1646–1652: Jan Koenraard van Aubremont
- 1652–1680: Filips Balthasar van Gendt
- 1680–1699: John Francis Desideratus, Prince of Nassau-Siegen
- 1699–1702: Philippe Emanuel, Prince of Hornes

=== County of Hainaut ===
- 1477–1482: Adolph of Cleves, Lord of Ravenstein
- 1482–1511: Philip I de Croÿ
- 1511–1521: Charles I de Croÿ
- 1521–1549: Philippe II de Croÿ
- 1549–1558: Charles II de Lalaing
- 1558–1560: Charles de Brimeu
- 1560–1566: John IV of Glymes
- 1566–1574: Philip of Noircarmes
- 1574–1582: Philip de Lalaing, 3rd Count of Lalaing
- 1582–1590: Emanuel Philibert de Lalaing
- 1592–1606: Charles III de Croÿ
- 1613–16??: Charles Bonaventure de Longueval, 2nd Count of Bucquoy
- 1663–1674: Philippe François, 1st Duke of Arenberg

=== County of Holland, Zeeland, and Utrecht ===
The stadtholdership of Holland and Zealand has always been combined. Since the office was instituted there in 1528, the stadtholder of Utrecht has been the same as the one of Holland, with one exception. In 1572, William the Silent was elected as the stadtholder, although Philip II had appointed a different one.

During the First Stadtholderless Period, the provinces of Holland, Zealand and Utrecht were governed by their States free from autocratic intervention. The Second Stadtholderless Period in Holland ended when the Frisian stadtholder became hereditary stadtholder for all provinces of the Dutch Republic.

- 1433–1440: Hugo van Lannoy
- 1440–1445: Willem van Lalaing
- 1445–1448: Gozewijn de Wilde
- 1448–1462: Jean de Lannoy
- 1462–1477: Louis de Gruuthuse
- 1477–1480: Wolfert VI of Borselen
- 1480–1483: Joost de Lalaing
- 1483–1515: John III of Egmont
- 1515–1521: Henry III of Nassau-Breda
- 1522–1540: Antoine of Lalaing, 1st Count of Hoogstraeten
- 1540–1544: René of Châlon
- 1544–1546: Louis of Praet
- 1547–1558: Maximilian of Burgundy
- 1559–1567: William the Silent
- 1567–1573: Maximilien de Hénin, 3rd Count of Bossu
- 1573–1574: Philip of Noircarmes
- 1574–1577: Gillis van Berlaymont
- 1572–1584: William the Silent
- 1584–1589: Adolf van Nieuwenaar
- 1585–1625: Maurice, Prince of Orange
- 1625–1647: Frederick Henry, Prince of Orange
- 1647–1650: William II, Prince of Orange
- 1650–1672: First Stadtholderless Period
- 1672–1702: William III of England
- 1702–1747: Second Stadtholderless Period

=== Duchy of Jülich ===
Only one Habsburg stadtholder was ever appointed over the Duchy of Jülich, when that country was occupied in 1543 at the end of the Guelders Wars. However, it soon became clear that Jülich would not become part of the Habsburg Netherlands, but would remain in the possession of the House of La Marck. The stadtholdership was abolished the same year.

- 1543: Philip de Lalaing, 2nd Count of Hoogstraten

=== Duchy of Luxembourg ===
- 1451–1475: Antoine I de Croÿ
- 14??–1511: Philip I de Croÿ
- 1545–1552: Peter Ernst I von Mansfeld-Vorderort
- 1552–1555: Maarten van Rossum
- 1556–1558: Charles de Brimeu
- 1559–1604: Peter Ernst I von Mansfeld-Vorderort (second time)
- 1604–1626: Florent de Berlaymont
- 1627–1636: Christopher of East Frisia
- 1648–1650: Philippe François de Croy, Duke of Havré
- 1654–1675: Philippe d'Arenberg
- 1675–16??: John Charles de Landas (acting)
- 1680–1684: Ernest-Dominique of Arenberg, 10th Prince of Chimay
- 1684–1686: Henri de Lambert
- 1686–1687: Louis-François de Boufflers
- 1687–1690: Nicolas Catinat
- 1697–1713: Jean-Frédéric d'Autel
- 1727–1734: Franz Paul von Wallis

=== Lordship of Overijssel ===
- 1528–1540: Georg Schenck van Toutenburg
- 1540–1548: Maximiliaan van Egmond
- 1548–1568: Jean de Ligne
- 1568–1572: Charles de Brimeu
- 1572–1573: Gillis van Berlaymont
- 1573–1576: Gaspar de Robles
- 1576–1581: George de Lalaing, Count of Rennenberg
- 1581–1594: Francisco Verdugo
- 1594–1618: Frederik van den Bergh
- 1584–1589: Adolf van Nieuwenaar
- 1590–1625: Maurice, Prince of Orange
- 1625–1647: Frederick Henry, Prince of Orange
- 1647–1650: William II, Prince of Orange
- 1650–1675: First Stadtholderless period
- 1675–1702: William III, Prince of Orange
- 1702–1747: Second Stadtholderless period
- 1747–1751: William IV, Prince of Orange
- 1751–1795: William V, Prince of Orange

=== Duchy of Limburg ===
- 1473–1477: Guy of Brimeu, stadtholder-general
- 1542–1572: Johan I of East Frisia
- 1574–1578: Arnold II Huyn van Amstenrade, Lord of Geleen and Eijsden
- 1578–1579: Cristóbal de Mondragón
- 1579–1597: Claude van Wittem van Beersel
- 1597–1612: Gaston Spinola
- 1612–1620: Maximilian of Saint-Aldegonde
- 1620–1624: Charles Emanuel of Gorrevod
- 1624–1626: Hermann of Burgundy
- 1626–1632: Hugo of Noyelles
- 1632–1635: Occupation by the Dutch
- 1635–1640: Guillaume de Bette, 1st Marquess of Lede
- 1640–1647: Jan van Wiltz
- 1649–1665: Lancelot II Schetz
- 1665–1684: John Francis Desideratus, Prince of Nassau-Siegen
- 1685–1702: Henri, 4th Prince of Ligne
- 1702–1703: Franz Sigismund of Thurn und Taxis
- 1703–1705: Philipp Ludwig Wenzel von Sinzendorf
- 1705–1707: Jan Peter de Goës
- 1707–1709: Ferdinand Bertrand de Quiros
- 1709–1710: Johann Wenzel of Gallas
- 1710–1713: Frans Adolf of Sinzerling
- 1713: Philipp Ludwig Wenzel von Sinzendorf
- 1713–1714: George of Tunderfeld
- 1714–1723: Franz Sigismund of Thurn und Taxis
- 1725–1728: Otto of Vehlen
- 1728–1754: Wolfgang Willem of Bournonville

=== Lordship of Mechelen ===
- 1566–1567: Antoine de Lalaing, 3rd Count of Hoogstraeten in Habsburg service
- 29 May 1579: Catholic citizen militia expelled Calvinist rebel forces from Mechelen; city governor and military commander Pontus de Noyelles defected to the Habsburg camp.
- 9 April 1580: English Fury at Mechelen: Calvinist rebel forces recaptured Mechelen.
- 15??–1594?: Pierre de Melun, in service of the rebel States-General

=== County of Namur ===
==== In Habsburg service ====
- 1429–1473: Jean II de Croÿ, lord of Chimay
- 1485–1???: John III of Glymes, lord of Bergen op Zoom (fell into disgrace and had to resign)
- 1503–1507: William de Croÿ, lord of Chièvres
- 1509–1532: John III of Glymes, lord of Bergen op Zoom (restored to office)
- 1532–1541: Anthony of Glymes, marquess of Bergen op Zoom
- 1541–1545: Pierre de Barbançon, lord of Werchin
- 1553/4–1578: Charles de Berlaymont, baron of Hierges
- 1578–1579: Gillis van Berlaymont, lord of Hierges
- 1579–1599?: Florent de Berlaymont, count of Lalaing and Berlaymont
- 1599–16??: Charles II of Egmont
- 16??–16??: Albert François de Croÿ-Roeulx, count of Megen

=== Tournaisis ===
==== In Habsburg service ====
- 1555–1556: Perre de Barbançon, lord of Werchin
- 1559–1570?: Floris of Montmorency, baron of Montigny
- 1581–1588?: Philippe de Récourt, baron de Licques (Liques), castellan of Lens, from 1574 to 1576 governor of Cambrésis

==== In States-General service ====
- 15??–1594?: Pierre de Melun, grandson of Peter van Barbançon. During the Siege of Tournai (1581), his wife Marie-Christine de Lalaing defended the city.

== See also ==
The Low Countries in 1560. Habsburg Netherlands Prince-Bishopric of Liège Principality of Stavelot-Malmedy Prince-Bishopric of Cambrésis

- List of Belgian monarchs
- Duchy of Bouillon
- List of bishops and archbishops of Cambrai
- List of governors of the Habsburg Netherlands
- List of bishops and prince-bishops of Liège
- List of monarchs of Luxembourg
- List of monarchs of the Netherlands
- List of rulers of the Netherlands
- Principality of Sedan

== Bibliography ==
- Gorter-Van Royen, L.V.G. (1995). Maria van Hongarije: regentes der Nederlanden : een politieke analyse op basis van haar regentschapsordonnanties en haar correspondentie met Karel V. Hilversum: Uitgeverij Verloren. p. 383. ISBN 9789065503947.
- Tracy, J.D. (2008). The Founding of the Dutch Republic: War, Finance, and Politics in Holland 1572–1588. Oxford University Press. ISBN 978-0-19-920911-8.
