= Berlaymont (name) =

Berlaymont, also de Berlaymont and van Berlaymont is a family name derived from Berlaimont and the title of the French Counts of Berlaymont.

Notable people with the name include:

- Charles de Berlaymont (c. 1510–1578), nobleman
- Claude de Berlaymont (1550–1587), Flemish military commander
- Florent de Berlaymont (c. 1550–1626), nobleman
- Gillis van Berlaymont (c. 1540–1579), nobleman
- Lancelot de Berlaymont (c. 1550–1578), first husband of Marie de Brimeu
- Louis de Berlaymont (1542–1596), aristocratic clergyman
