= Capture of Geertruidenberg =

Capture of Geertruidenberg can refer to:

- Capture of Geertruidenberg (1573), a battle during the Eighty Years' War
- Capture of Geertruidenberg (1589), a later battle during that same war
