= Maximiliaan van Egmond =

16th century Count of Buren and Leerdam

- Coat of arms
- Born: 1509
- Died: 24 December 1548 (aged 38–39)
- Noble family: House of Egmond
- Spouse: Françoise de Lannoy

Maximiliaan of Egmont (1509 – 24 December 1548) was Count of Buren and Leerdam, and Stadtholder of Friesland (succeeding George Schenck) from 1540 until 1548. He was the son of Floris van Egmont whom he succeeded as count after his father's death in 1539.

== Biography ==
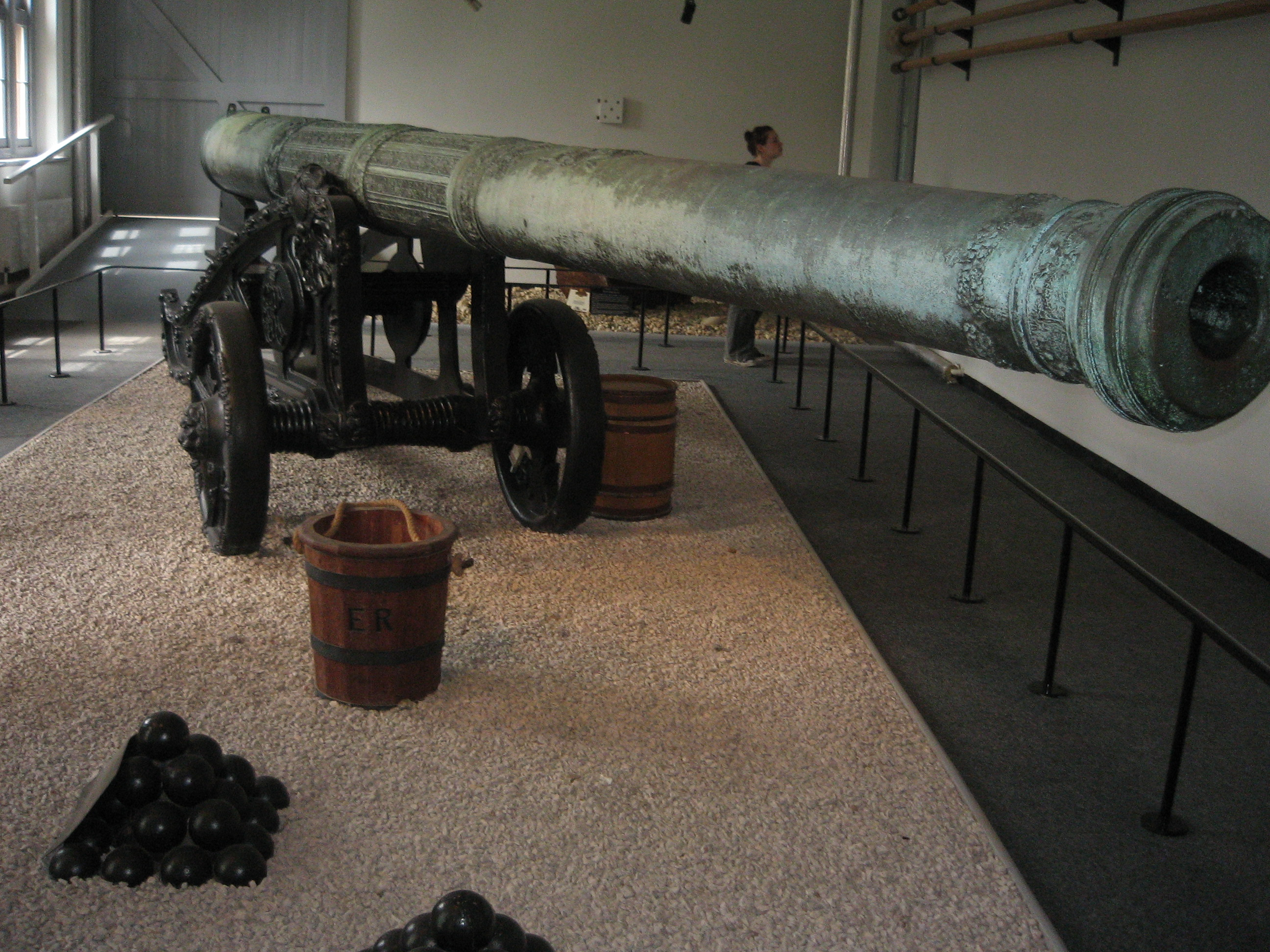
Maximilian presented this cannon to Henry VIII in 1544

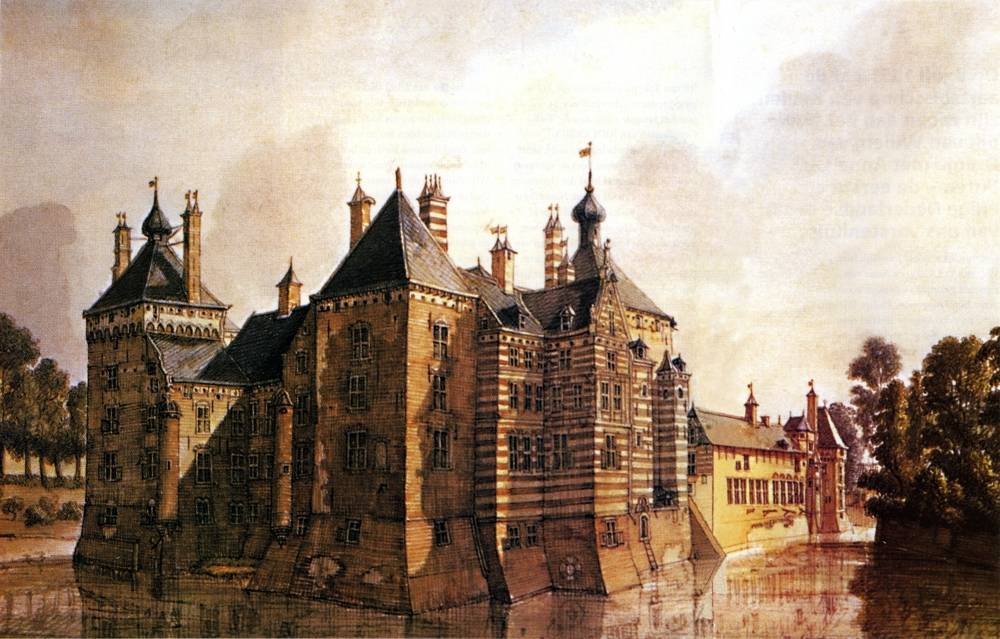
Buren castle, residence of Maximiliaan van Egmond

Maximiliaan van Egmond was born in 1509. He studied Ancient Greek at the Catholic University of Leuven in 1516 and was a friend of the 16th century intellectual Erasmus. By 1528, he was at the court of Érard de La Marck, Prince-Bishop of Liege.

In 1537, he was in the service of the Holy Roman Emperor Charles V and was made a member of the Order of the Golden Fleece for distinguishing himself as military commander of the Dutch army against France. He later saw action in the Schmalkaldic War from 1546 to 1547. Maximilian was married in 1531 to a French noblewoman, Françoise de Lannoy (1513-1562) and they had one child, Anna of Egmond, who later married William the Silent, Prince of Orange in 1551. In England he is remembered as an ally of Henry VIII during the period of war between England, Scotland and France (1544–1551) known as The Rough Wooing. After the 1544 siege of Boulogne-sur-Mer Egmont presented the king with the basilisk Queen Elizabeth's Pocket Pistol as a gift for his young daughter the future Elizabeth I.

== Death ==
He died of sickness in 1548, attended by the surgeon Vesalius. On his death bed he wore full armor and drank to the health of the Holy Roman Emperor.
