= Siege of Schoonhoven (1575) =

1575 siege

Coordinates: 51.9475°N 4.8486°E

- Part of the Eighty Years' War
Date	11–24 August 1575
Location	Schoonhoven, Spanish Netherlands (present-day the Netherlands)
Result	Spanish victory

Belligerents
Dutch rebels	Spain

Commanders and leaders
De La Garde	Gilles de Berlaymont

The siege of Schoonhoven of 1575, also known as the capture of Schoonhoven, was a Spanish victory that took place between 11 and 24 August 1575, at Schoonhoven, Spanish Netherlands (present-day South Holland, the Netherlands), during the Eighty Years' War and the Anglo-Spanish War (1585–1604). On June 28, 1575, the Spanish forces, between 8,000 and 10,000 soldiers, led by Gilles de Berlaymont, Lord of Hierges, and Stadtholder of Guelders, Holland, Zeeland and Utrecht, captured Buren, and on August 7, Oudewater. The Spanish commander continued its successful progress and arrived at Schoonhoven on August 11. After 13 days of siege, and a courageous but futile resistance, the rebel forces led by De La Garde, composed by Dutch, English, Scottish, French and Walloon troops (about 800 men), surrendered to the more experienced Spanish troops, on August 24. The population of the town, that were unwilling to help the rebel forces, received Berlaymont with great joy.

Two weeks later, the Spanish forces under Charles de Brimeu, Count of Megen, marched towards Woerden, and laid siege to the town on September 8.

== See also ==
- Siege of Zierikzee (1576)
- Siege of Maastricht (1579)
- List of Stadtholders of the Low Countries
