= Queen Elizabeth's Pocket Pistol =

Cannon built in 1544 in Utrecht, Netherlands

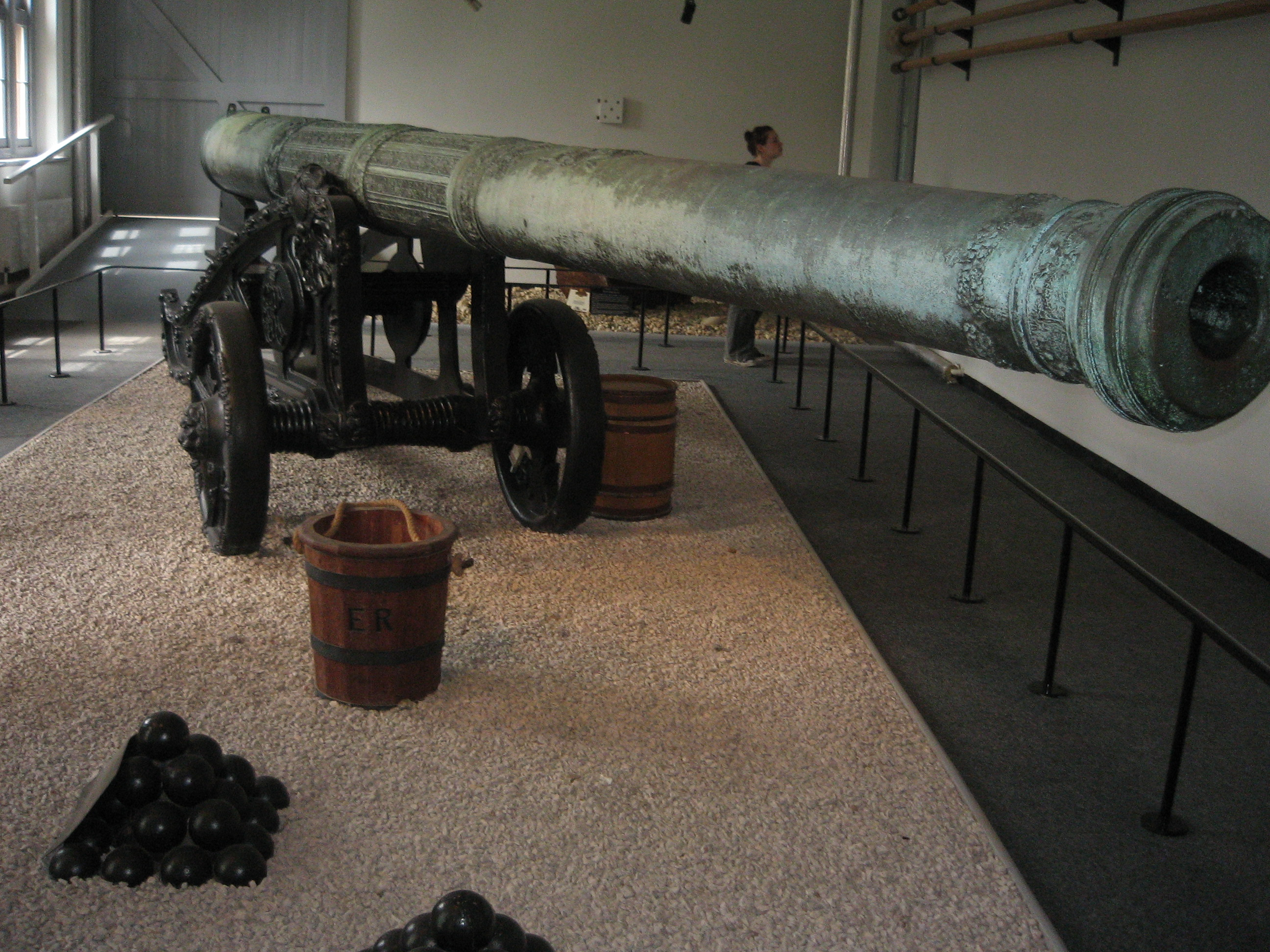
Queen Elizabeth's Pocket Pistol on display within Dover Castle

Queen Elizabeth's Pocket Pistol is a cannon built in 1544 in Utrecht by Jan Tolhuys, before Elizabeth I came to the throne. The gun was presented to Henry VIII by Maximiliaan van Egmond, Count of Buren and Stadtholder of Friesland, as a gift for his young daughter Elizabeth.

The cannon measures 24 ft (7.32 m) in length and fired 4.75 inch (121 mm) calibre cannonballs. The cannon is decorated with engravings of fruit, flowers, grotesques, and figures symbolizing Liberty, Victory and Fame. There is also a Tudor coat of arms which includes a verse in Dutch, which translates in English as Break, tear every wall and rampart, Am I called, Across mountain and valley, pierces my ball, By me stricken.

Between 1613 and 1622 the gun was used and was found to be capable of firing a 10 lb (4.5 kg) ball a distance of 2000 yards (1.8 km). Before the English Civil War it guarded the cliffs of Dover and propaganda of the time claimed it could fire a 12 lb (5.44 kg) ball seven miles. Some even said its shot could reach France if the gun was properly maintained though this is an exaggeration; tests done in the 1970s with similar basilisks have a more realistic range of 1200 yards with a 10 lb (4.54 kg) ball.

In 1644 King Charles I's forces in Cornwall reported capturing from the Earl of Essex '49 Peeces of faire Brasse Ordnance (taken then and the day before) among which was the great Basilisco of Dover ...'. This cannon has since been identified as Queen Elizabeth's Pocket Pistol. Later that year the gun saw action at the siege of Hull where it was recaptured by the Roundheads and used at the Siege of Sheffield.

The cannon can be seen at Dover Castle on a replacement carriage made in the 18th century from captured French guns. A copy of the cannon is displayed in Buren, Netherlands, next to the museum of the Dutch royal family.
