= Siege of Oudewater (1575) =

Event during the Eighty Years' War

- Part of the Eighty Years' War
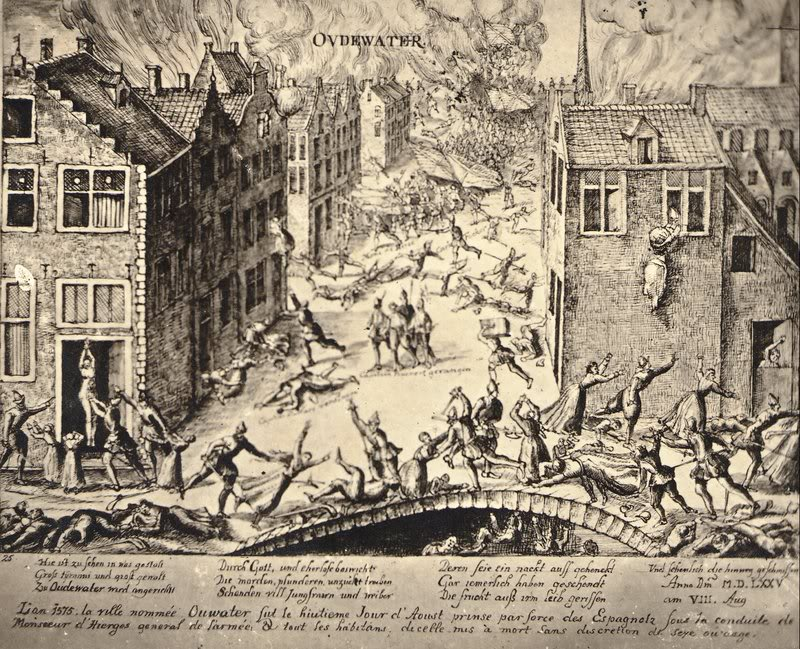
- Depiction of the siege of Oudewater
Date	19 July – 7 August 1575
Location	Oudewater, Utrecht (present-day the Netherlands)
Result	Spanish victory

Belligerents
Dutch rebels	Spain

Commanders and leaders
	(Spain) Gillis van Berlaymont

The siege of Oudewater was an event during the Eighty Years' War that took place in the Dutch town of Oudewater, culminating in the Oudewater Massacre ((in Dutch) Oudewaterse moord). The siege by Spanish troops started on 19 July 1575 and ended on 7 August 1575, when the town was taken by storm and plundered.

== Background ==
In 1568 a garrison of the Spanish Army was stationed in Oudewater. On 19 June 1572 Adriaen van Swieten, a nobleman and deputy of William of Orange, entered the town with a small number of troops and convinced it to join the Dutch Revolt against Philip II of Spain.

== Siege and massacre ==
The siege by Spanish troops under command of stadtholder Gillis van Berlaymont started on 19 July 1575 and ended in a bloodbath on 7 August 1575. Many of the inhabitants were put to the sword, and some citizens set their own houses on fire to spite looters, leading to a major conflagration. In total, as many as half the inhabitants of the town may have died.

== Commemoration ==
In 1615 the States of Holland authorised pensions to the 300 survivors of the massacre then still living, the last payments on which were made in 1664. An annual commemoration of the massacre was instituted in 1608. It is now held each year on the first Sunday on or after 7 August.
