= Battle on the Zuiderzee =

Naval battle in the Forty Years War

Coordinates: 52°33′N 5°10′E

- Part of the Eighty Years' War
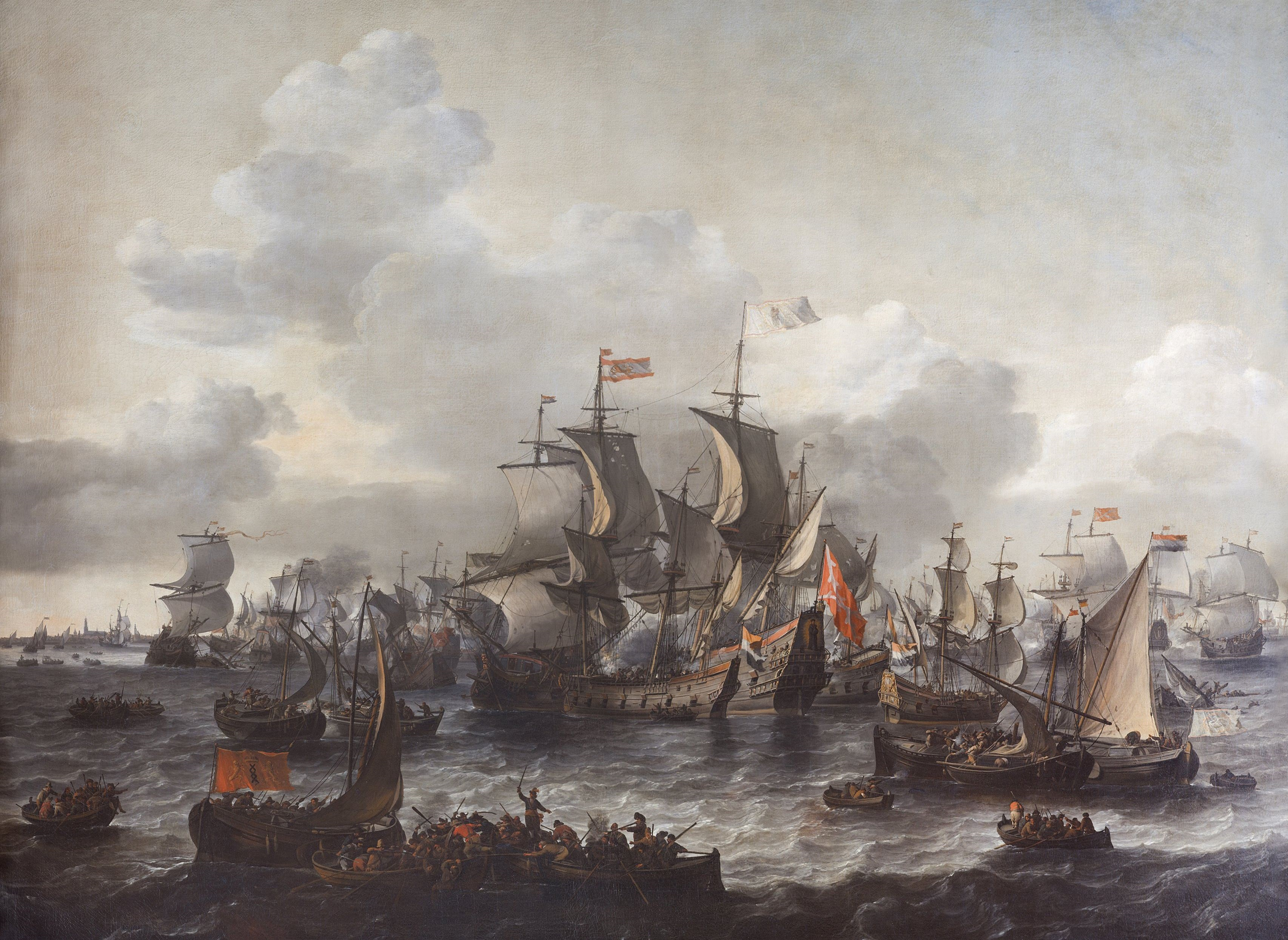
- The battle, painted by Jan Theunisz. Blanckerhoff.
Date	October 11, 1573
Location	Zuiderzee (now IJsselmeer)
Result	Dutch victory: Duke of Alva is forced to abandon Amsterdam

Belligerents
Dutch rebels: Geuzen	Spanish Empire

Commanders and leaders
Cornelis Jansz Dircksz	(Spanish Empire) Count of Boussu (POW)

Strength
24 ships 700 sailors	30 ships 1300 sailors

Casualties and losses
1 ship lost 25 sailors lost	6 ships captured 300 sailors captured

The Battle on the Zuiderzee (October 11, 1573) was a naval battle during the Eighty Years' War in which a Dutch fleet triumphed over a larger and better-equipped Spanish fleet on the Zuiderzee.

== Prelude ==
During the years prior to the Battle of the Zuiderzee, the largest Dutch city, Amsterdam, had not joined the uprising and remained loyal to the king of Spain. Because supply routes for cities in the area controlled by both the Spanish and the Dutch almost exclusively went through the Zuiderzee, Dutch rebels (calling themselves de Geuzen) attempted to disturb this route as much as possible in small skirmishes and raids against Spanish ports. In 1573 the Spanish Governor Maximilian de Henin Count of Bossu sent a fleet consisting of about 30 ships with a crew of over 1,300 people with the prerogative to halt the attacks and destroy the enemy force. This fleet also included his flagship, the Inquisition. Weighing in at just over 250 tons, the Inquisition had reinforced sides consisting of armored plating. Opposing Henin's fleet was a small fleet the Gueux managed to assemble. This fleet consisted of 24 much smaller and lightly armed ships. Altogether, this fleet consisted of around 700 men.

== Battle ==
Henin and his fleet left Amsterdam on October 5 and immediately hit a standstill in the midst of his attack. Gueux forces continually attacked Henin's fleet. Due to the Gueux's lack of heavily armed ships, instead of a frontal assault against the Spanish fleet, they had chosen to attempt to board, and if possible capture the Spanish ships. If capture was not possible, the boats would be destroyed. Trying to minimize their casualties against the heavier guns, the Gueux attempted to head straight for the Spanish ships. But during the battle, heavy winds hindered the Dutch's attempts greatly, as the winds prevented their ships from getting near to the Spanish ships, and thus halting their chance of boarding. With their main mode of attack thwarted, the Dutch fleet was no match for the Spanish guns, and suffered heavy losses.

It was not until October 11 that the wind turned and the Dutch could execute a surprise attack. During this attack, the Spanish flagship was boarded by the Dutch and during the course of the battle ran aground.

The rest of the Spanish fleet fled and Maximilien de Hénin-Liétard and his crew surrendered after the Dutch promised to spare their lives.

== Aftermath ==
After this lost battle and the failed Siege of Alkmaar, the first city controlled by the Dutch rebels during the Eighty Years' War to resist the siege of the Spanish troops, Philip II started a change in policy and Fernando Álvarez de Toledo, 3rd Duke of Alba returned to Spain being replaced by Luis de Requesens y Zúñiga as governor of the Habsburg Netherlands.
