= Maximilien de Hénin, 3rd Count of Boussu =

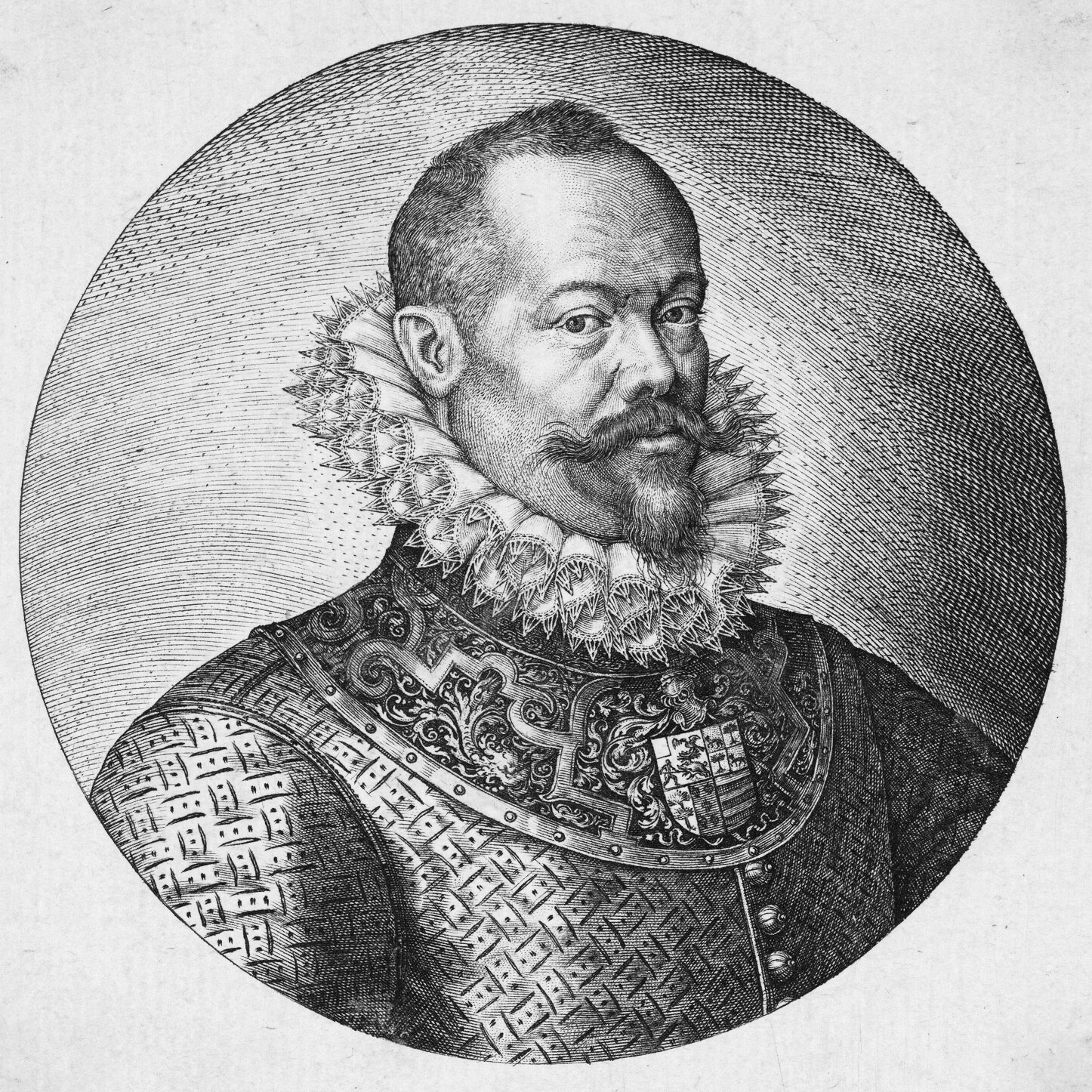
Maximilien de Hénin-Liétard, count of Boussu

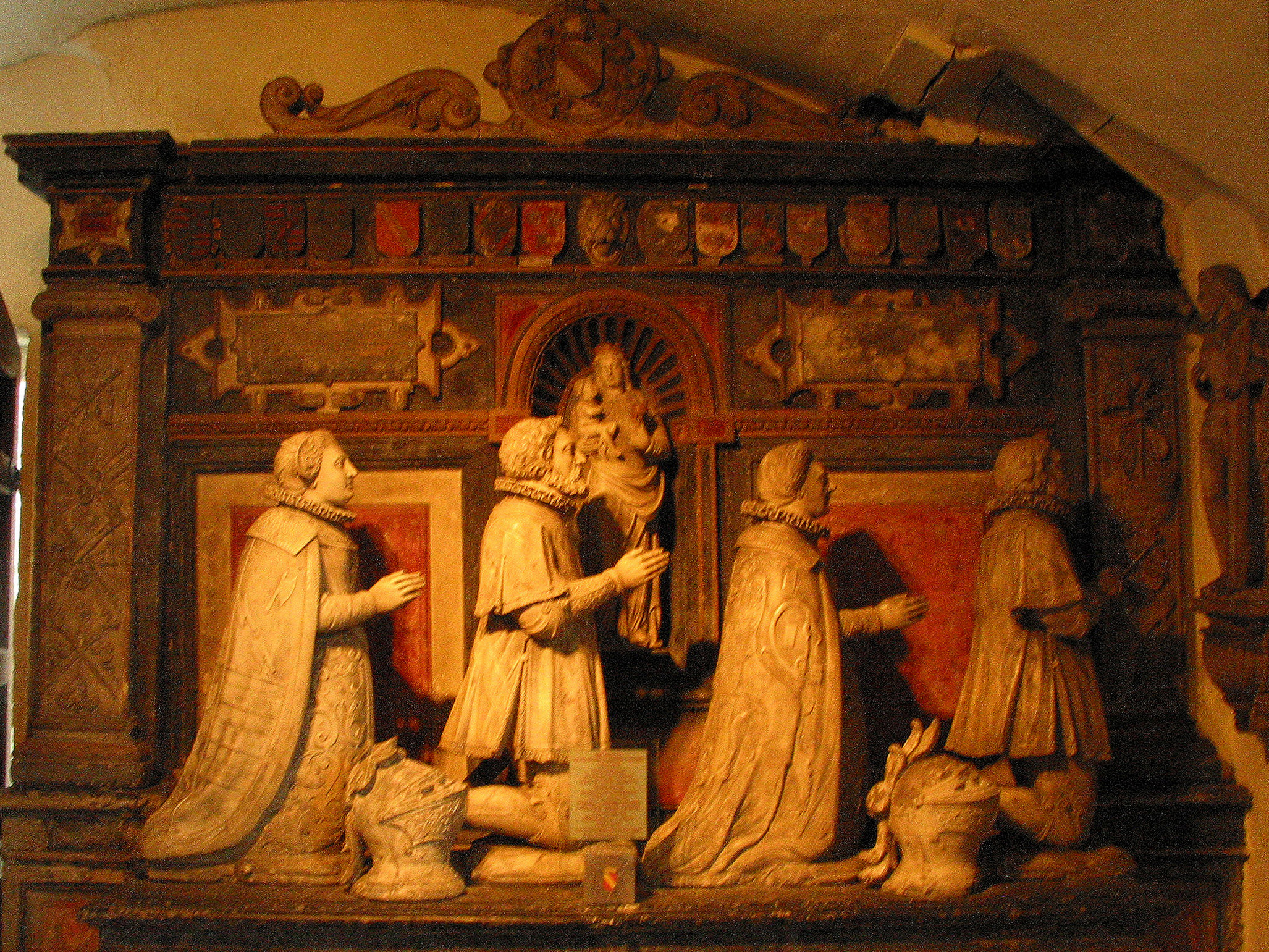
Mausoleum of the Counts of Boussu by Jacques Du Brœucq

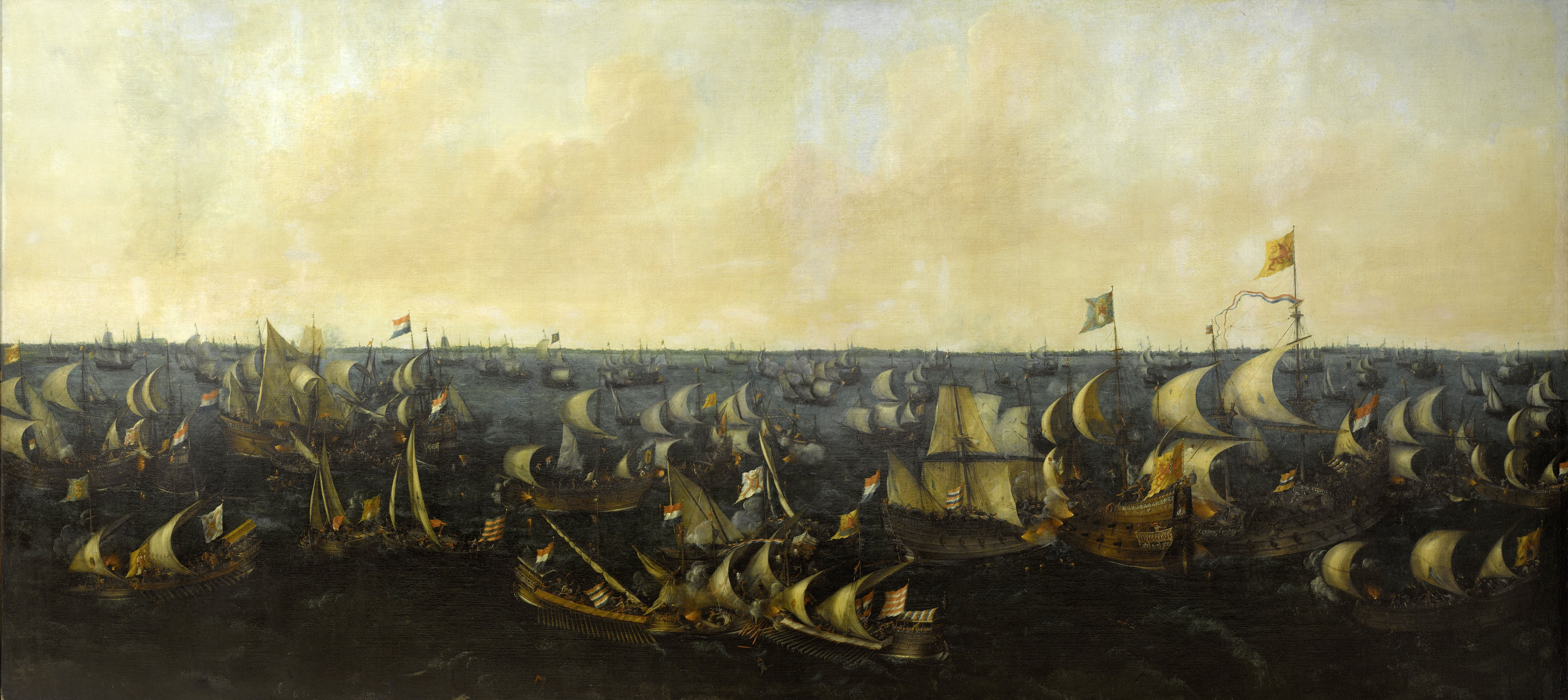
Battle on the Zuiderzee, by Abraham de Verwer

Maximilien de Hénin-Liétard, Count of Boussu (1542 – Antwerp, 21 December 1578) was a soldier and statesman from the Habsburg Netherlands. During the Eighty Years' War he was the royalist stadtholder of Holland, Zeeland and Utrecht from 1567 until he was made a prisoner of war during the Battle on the Zuiderzee in 1573. After being freed under the terms of the Pacification of Ghent he changed sides and became commander in chief of the forces of the States-General of the Netherlands.

== Early life ==
Boussu (or Bossu) as he is known in most historical works, was born as the son of Count Jean de Hénin-Liétard, scion of an aristocratic family from Hainaut, and Anne of Bourgondië-Beveren, descendant from a bastard of Philip of Burgundy. His uncle was Maximiliaan II van Bourgondië, from 1547 Charles V's stadtholder of Holland, Zeeland and Utrecht and admiral of the Habsburg navy, which had its headquarters at the time in Veere. This city was also a Marquessate in possession of the Van Bourgondië family. When his uncle Maximiliaan died in 1558, Boussu inherited this marquessate. However, the title had to be sold for debt and eventually ended up in the hands of the Prince of Orange. Boussu married Charlotte de Werchin and had one son, Pierre.

== Stadtholderate ==
When the Prince of Orange had to flee the Netherlands for fear of becoming a victim of the Duke of Alba's repression at the beginning of the Eighty Years' War, Philip II of Spain's Regent Margaret of Parma appointed Boussu as his successor as stadtholder of Holland, Zeeland and Utrecht on 17 June 1567. As stadtholder he also commanded the royalist forces in those three provinces. When on 1 April 1572 a fleet of Sea-Beggar privateers surprised the port of Brill on the Dutch coast, Boussu therefore launched a counterattack from his base at Vredenburg castle in Utrecht. However, he was unable to recapture the port. This failure to deny the followers of the Prince of Orange a foothold in Holland quickly resulted in a loss of control over a large part of Holland and Zeeland as the rebellion spread. Boussu convened the States of Holland in early July, 1572 in The Hague but by that time a majority of the voting cities had gone over to the rebel side and they convened their own States in Dordrecht later that month. The rebel States subsequently reinstated Orange as rival "royal" stadtholder of the three provinces. Boussu's area of control in Holland was in effect reduced to a few loyal cities, like Amsterdam. This merchant city was subsequently blockaded by a Sea-Beggar fleet. To break the blockade Boussu personally led a royalist fleet in the Battle on the Zuiderzee. He was defeated and made a prisoner of war. He was succeeded by first, Philip of Noircarmes, and after the latter's death in March, 1574, by Gilles de Berlaymont, lord of Hierges as royalist stadtholder of Holland, Zeeland and Utrecht.

== Commander-in-chief ==
At the conclusion of the Pacification of Ghent (which treaty mentions him by name) he was freed again. The Pacification united for a time the entire Habsburg Netherlands in opposition to king Philip II. Boussu now took a commission from the States-General to lead their army. However, he was not very successful. At the Battle of Gembloux of 31 January 1578 he was soundly beaten by the Spanish army under Alexander Farnese, Duke of Parma. However, half a year later his army beat the army of Don Juan at the Battle of Rijmenam (1578) which forced Don Juan to give up much terrain gained since Gembloux. Boussu retired to Antwerp where he died at the end of 1578.

== Sources ==
- Israel, Jonathan I (1995), The Dutch Republic. Its Rise, Greatness, and Fall 1477-1806, Clarendon Press, Oxford, ISBN 0-19-873072-1.
- Tracy, J.D. (2008) The Founding of the Dutch Republic. War, Finance, and Politics in Holland 1572-1588. Oxford U.P. ISBN 978-0-19-920911-8
- Boon, Piet (2023), Maximiliaan de Hénin-Liétard, graaf van Boussu (1542-1578). Van koninklijk stadhouder tot naaste medewerker van Willem van Oranje, Hilversum, Verloren. ISBN 9789464550498

Political offices
Preceded by William, Prince of Orange	Stadtholder of Holland, Zeeland and Utrecht; 1567–1573	Succeeded by Philip of Noircarmes (during the Eighty Years' War)
