= Charles de Berlaymont =

Dutch noble

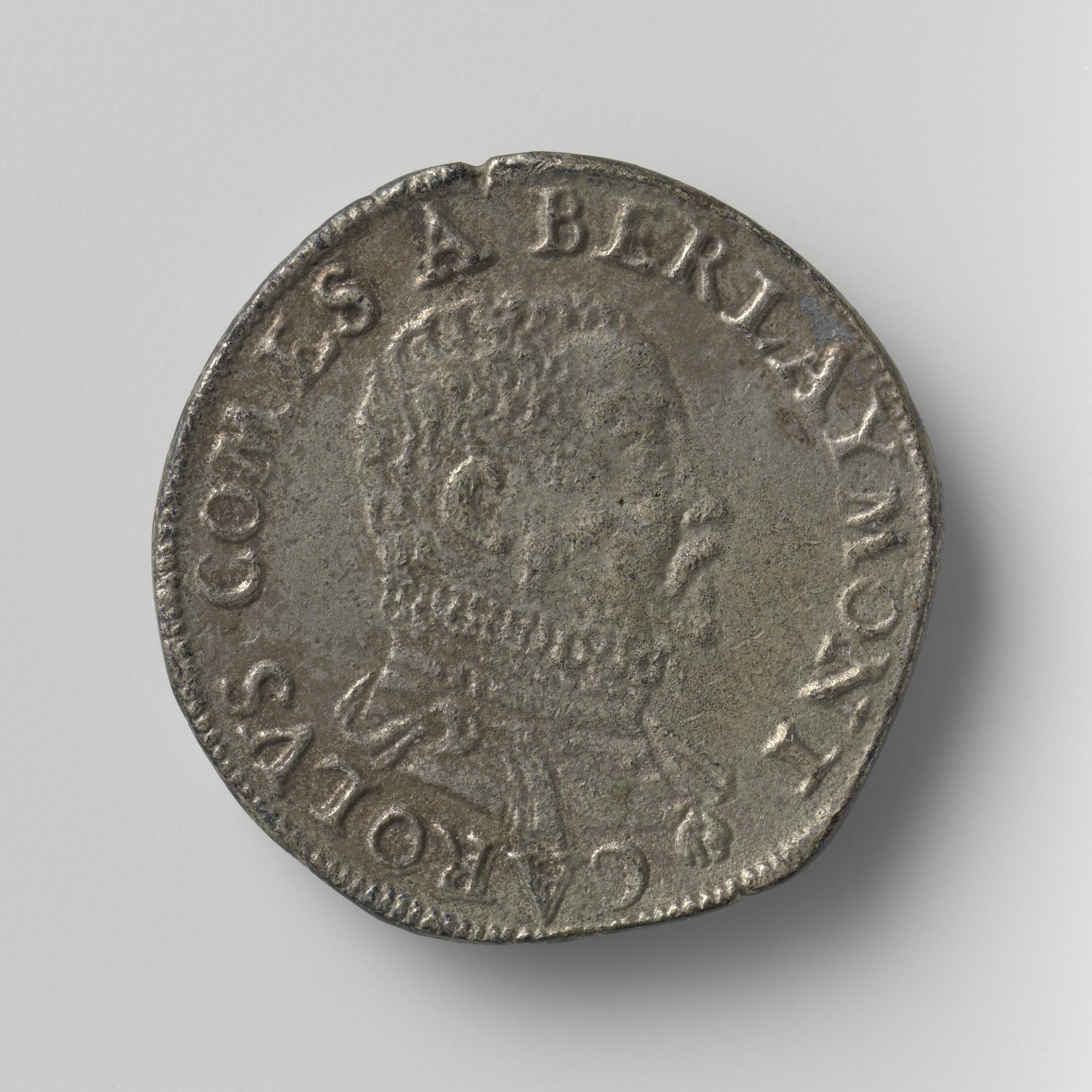

Charles de Berlaymont (c. 1510 in Berlaimont? – 1578 in Namur?) was a leading nobleman in the Low Countries in the 16th century. He was an important counselor of Margaret of Parma, Grand Huntsman of Brabant and generally sided with Spanish politics in the early years of the Eighty Years War.

== Biography ==
He was the son of Michèl de Berlaymont and Maria de Berault. He was lord of Floyon and Haultpenne, and baron of Hierges.

In 1553, he became stadtholder of Namur. Berlaymont was knight of the Order of the Golden Fleece, senior hunting master of Brabant, Flanders and Namur, member of the Council of State, hereditary chamberlain of finances and bailiff of the county of Namur. In 1567, he became a member of the much-dreaded Council of Troubles. In 1574, his home territory Berlaimont was elevated to the status of a county. In 1577, Berlaymont was one of the signees of the Union of Brussels, which he immediately repudiated. He is known for his famous comment on the Compromise of Nobles in 1566. The nobles had come to Brussels with a petition for Margaret of Parma, governess of the Netherlands, hoping to stop the persecution of Protestants. When Margaret asked who these people were, Berlaymont supposedly answered with "Ce ne sont que des gueux" (they are but beggars) after which the Dutch rebels promptly adopted the name Geuzen as their own.

== Issue ==
He was married to Adriana de Ligne Barbançon and had these children:

- Gilles de Berlaymont (ca. 1540 - 1579), stadtholder of various territories of the Seventeen Provinces. Died at the Siege of Maastricht (1579)
- Louis de Berlaymont (1542 - 1596), archbishop of Cambrai and prevost of Saint Servatius in Maastricht
- Lancelot de Berlaymont, lord of Beauraing
- Claude de Berlaymont (1550 - 1587), lord of Hautepenne, governor of Breda
- Florent de Berlaymont (ca. 1550 - 1626), lord of Floyon, knight of the Order of the Golden Fleece, stadtholder of Namur, Artois, Guelders and Luxembourg
- Adrienne de Berlaymont (? - 1582), married John of Brandenburg
- Yolande de Berlaymont (1560-?)
- Marie de Berlaymont (?)

== Bibliography ==
- d'Hovel, M. de Vegiano, Seigneur (1779). "Berlaymont". Nobiliaire des Pays-Bas, et du comté de Bourgogne. Supplement 1555-1614 (in French). Malines: J. Jacobs. pp. 16–18.
- (in Dutch) Gilles van Berlaymont moordt Oudewater uit 1546 - 1579
