= Basilisk (cannon) =

Type of cannon

The basilisk was a very heavy bronze cannon employed during the Late Middle Ages. The barrel of a basilisk could weigh up to 1,800 kg (4,000 lb) and could have a calibre of up to 13 cm (5 inches). On average they were around 3 meters long (10 feet), though some, like Queen Elizabeth's Pocket Pistol, were almost three times that length.

The basilisk got its name from the mythological basilisk: a fire-breathing venomous serpent that could cause large-scale destruction and kill its victims with its glance alone. It was thought that the very sight of its 72 kg (160 lb) shot would be enough to scare the enemy to death.

In 1588 the Spanish Armada was equipped with many basilisks for their invasion of England with the intent of using them to besiege towns loyal to Elizabeth I. Many of these guns were lost when the ships were wrecked on their return to Spain.

Due to its large size, the basilisk fell out of favour of European generals, who preferred lighter, more accurate artillery in the late 16th century. A late example is the Maltese Gun, built in Holland in 1607 and, like many of its contemporaries, fitted with a replacement carriage during the Napoleonic Wars.

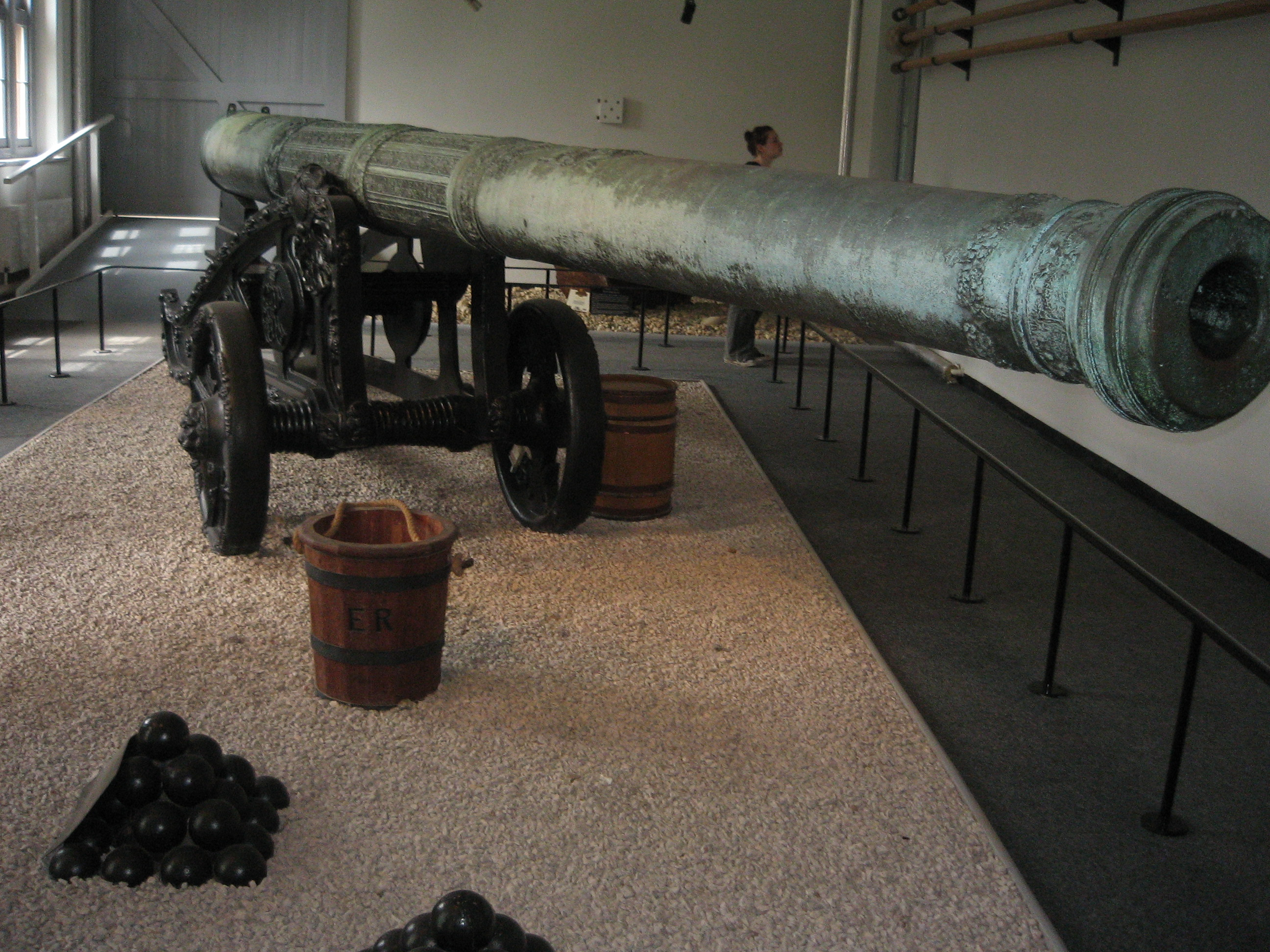
A large English basilisk known as Queen Elizabeth's Pocket Pistol

== See also ==
- Dardanelles Gun
