= Capture of Geertruidenberg (1573) =

Battle during the Eighty Years' War

Capture of Gertruidenberg (1573)
- Part of the Eighty Years' War
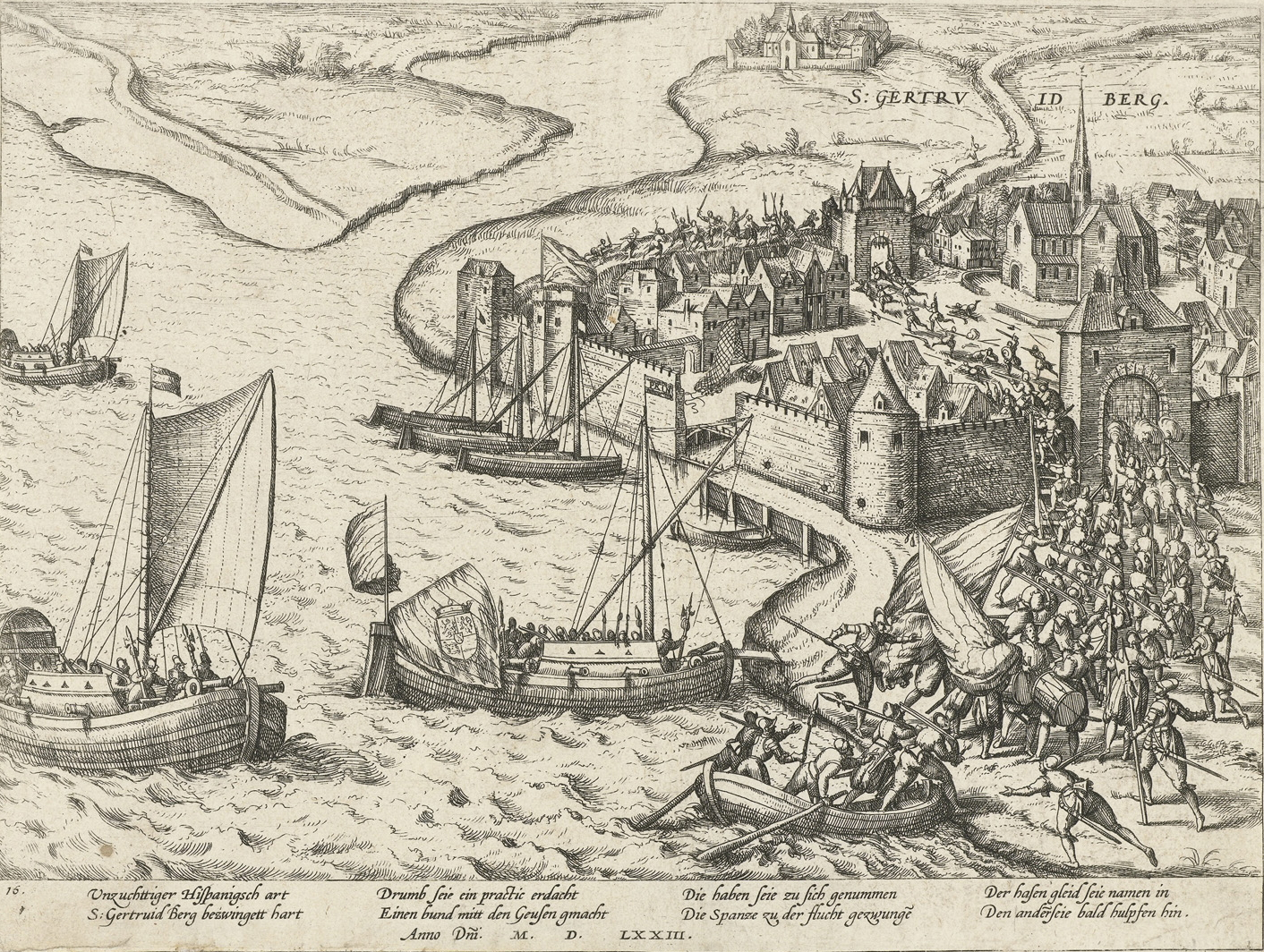
- Capture of Geertruidenberg, 1573; Etching by Frans Hogenberg
Date	28 August 1573
Location	Geertruidenberg (Present-day Netherlands) 51°42′00″N 04°51′31″E
Result	Dutch rebels victory

Belligerents
Dutch rebels	Spain

Commanders and leaders
Colonel de Poyet; Walter Morgan	(Spain) Captain Draek

Strength
300	170

Casualties and losses
4 killed	Most killed

The Capture of Geertruidenberg was a military event that took place on 28 August 1573 during the Eighty Years' War. The capture was carried out by a small force led by Colonel de Poyet. A small assault force led by Walter Morgan captured the main gate which enabled the complete surprise of the garrison, most of whom were put to the sword.

== Events ==
=== Background ===
The Spanish held town of Middelburg was under siege, which relied on a Spanish fleet to relieve the place. The Sea Beggars (known as the Guezen) however were successful in defeating and holding any relief attempts the Spanish made in the waters of Zeeland in April at the Battle of Borsele. A second Spanish relief force was turned back after Fort Rammekens surrendered to a rebel force in August. A beggar fleet as a result was able to sail and meet up with the Prince of Orange at Dordrecht. A small force was detached which consisted of English, Scottish, French Huguenot, and Flemish volunteers led by a French Huguenot Lieutenant Colonel de Poyet, numbering 300, with its aim of the capture of Geertruidenberg. The fleet sailed in the night towards the city.

The garrison in Geertruidenberg composed of a company of Walloons from Cristóbal de Mondragón's regiment, which included a number of Spanish officers, led by a French nobleman Captain Draek, in total a hundred and seventy men. The Protestant force landed at night on the coast of North Brabant and approached the city.

=== Capture ===
In the early morning of 31 August 1573 Colonel de Poyet ordered Walter Morgan and a Frenchman Captain Malion with eighteen hand-picked troops, including four Dutchmen who had lived and worked in the city, to scale the ramparts of the city and to open the Breda Gate. This was the key to the city, and, once opened, the attackers would be able to attack the city with speed and surprise. They went unnoticed, scaled the walls, then dispatched the sleeping guards, after which they were able to open the gate and let in the main force. The garrison troops then only became aware that the city was under attack and were taken completely by surprise. They attempted to fight back but all were killed, and only a few managed to escape, including Captain Draek; though wounded in the back he escaped through a back window. In his haste he had left on the table the entire pay to his men, much to the delight of the attackers.

The citizens were treated fairly well, despite a priest being killed and a monk hanged. An English soldier recalled that this was the first city to be captured for over a year and was a major boost to the morale of the Protestant forces. Only a few of the garrison escaped including Draek and they then fled to Breda.

=== Aftermath ===
After a garrison was established Poyet and Morgan returned via Dordrecht. The prince appointed Jerome Tseraarts as the garrison commander of Geertruidenberg, in whom he put great trust. On 8 September the first Protestant sermon was held.

The city stayed in States hands until April 1589 when an English and Dutch garrison under John Wingfield sold it to the Spanish under the Duke of Parma. The Spanish occupation would not last however, and on 25 June 1593 after a siege the city was back in Dutch hands for good.
