= Battle of Borsele =

Naval battle of the Eighty Years' War

The naval Battle of Borsele took place on 22 April 1573 during the Eighty Years' War between a Spanish fleet commanded by Sancho d'Avila and a Gueux fleet under Admiral Worst.

The Spanish fleet sailed from the port of Antwerp to try to supply the cities of Middelburg and Arnemuiden, which were besieged by Dutch troops. A few ships managed to reach their objective but the bulk of the Spanish ships were forced to return to Antwerp.
