= Florent de Berlaymont =

Belgian noble (d. 1626)

Florent of Berlaymont (c. 1550 – 3 April 1626) was Count of Lalaing and Berlaymont, and Stadtholder (governor) of Namur, Artois, Guelders-Zutphen and Luxembourg, in the service of the King of Spain.

He was the youngest son of Charles de Berlaymont and Adriana de Ligne Barbançon, and brother of Gilles de Berlaymont and Claude de Berlaymont. In 1576 Florent shortly joined the Union of Brussels, but soon became loyal to the King of Spain again. In 1579 he succeeded his brother Gilles, who was killed at the Siege of Maastricht (1579), as stadtholder of Namur and Artois.

Florent inherited the title of Count of Berlaymont from his father in 1578. By marrying Margaret of Lalaing, only daughter of Philip de Lalaing (1537–1582) and Margaret of Ligne, he also became Count of Lalaing in 1582.

Florent and Margaret of Lalaing had two daughters, one of whom, Marie-Margaret of Berlaymont, who married Louis of Egmont, prince of Gavere (died 1654).

When his other brother Claude was killed in 1587, Florent succeeded him as stadtholder of Guelders-Zutphen. In 1604, Florent also became stadtholder of Luxembourg, after the death of Peter Ernst I von Mansfeld-Vorderort.

Florent became a Knight in the Order of the Golden Fleece in 1586.
