= Gaspar de Robles =

Gaspar de Robles (1527, Madrid, Spain – 1585, Antwerp) was Stadholder of Friesland and Groningen at the beginning of the Eighty Years' War (reign: 1568 to 1576).

== Family ==
Robles was the son of Doña María de Leyte, probably the wet nurse for Philip II of Spain, and João Lopes of Robles. In 1558 he married Jeanne de Saint-Quentin, baroness of Billy, their son was Jean de Roblès 1st Count of Annappes. They are considered to be the founders of the Flemish branch of the house and became owner of the castle and lands in Billy in the County of Artois south of Lille. Amongst his many descendants we find the Dukes of Ursel.

don João Lopes of Robles

  1. don Caspar de Robles, Lord of Billy;
    married to Jeanne de Saint-Quentin
    1. don Juan de Robles, 1st Count of Annappes;
      married to Marie de Liedekerke.
      1. don Alejandro de Robles, 2nd Count of Annappes;
        married to dona Francisca de Mancicidor
        1. Michel de Robles, 3rd Count of Annapes;
          married to Catherine de St-Aldegonde.

== Military life ==
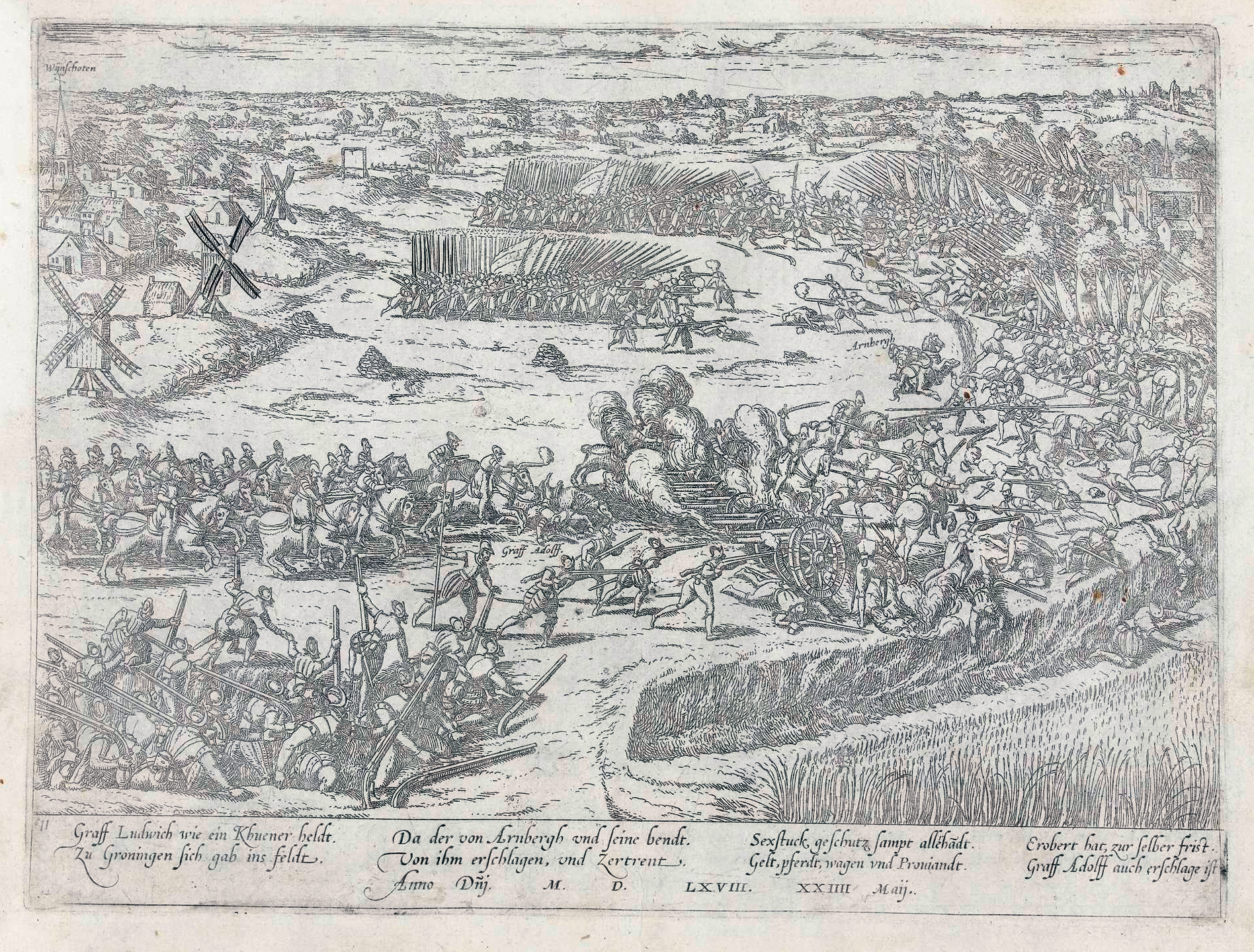
Battle of Heiligerlee

On 17 May 1568, de Robles landed with 1800 Walloon soldiers under his leadership in Harlingen. Six days later he was defeated by Louis of Nassau in the Battle of Heiligerlee, together with the Spanish army of Jean de Ligne, Duke of Aremberg, who was killed.

De Robles then took part in the victorious battle of Jemmingen against the Dutch rebels led by Louis of Nassau, who only just managed to escape. Consequently, De Robles became Stadtholder of Frisia and prevented the uprising of the Frisian cities which had only limited defences. He supported Fadrique Álvarez de Toledo with 1000 Walloon soldiers during the siege of Haarlem. On 23 May 1573, he was slightly injured by a musket shot.

== Civil achievements ==
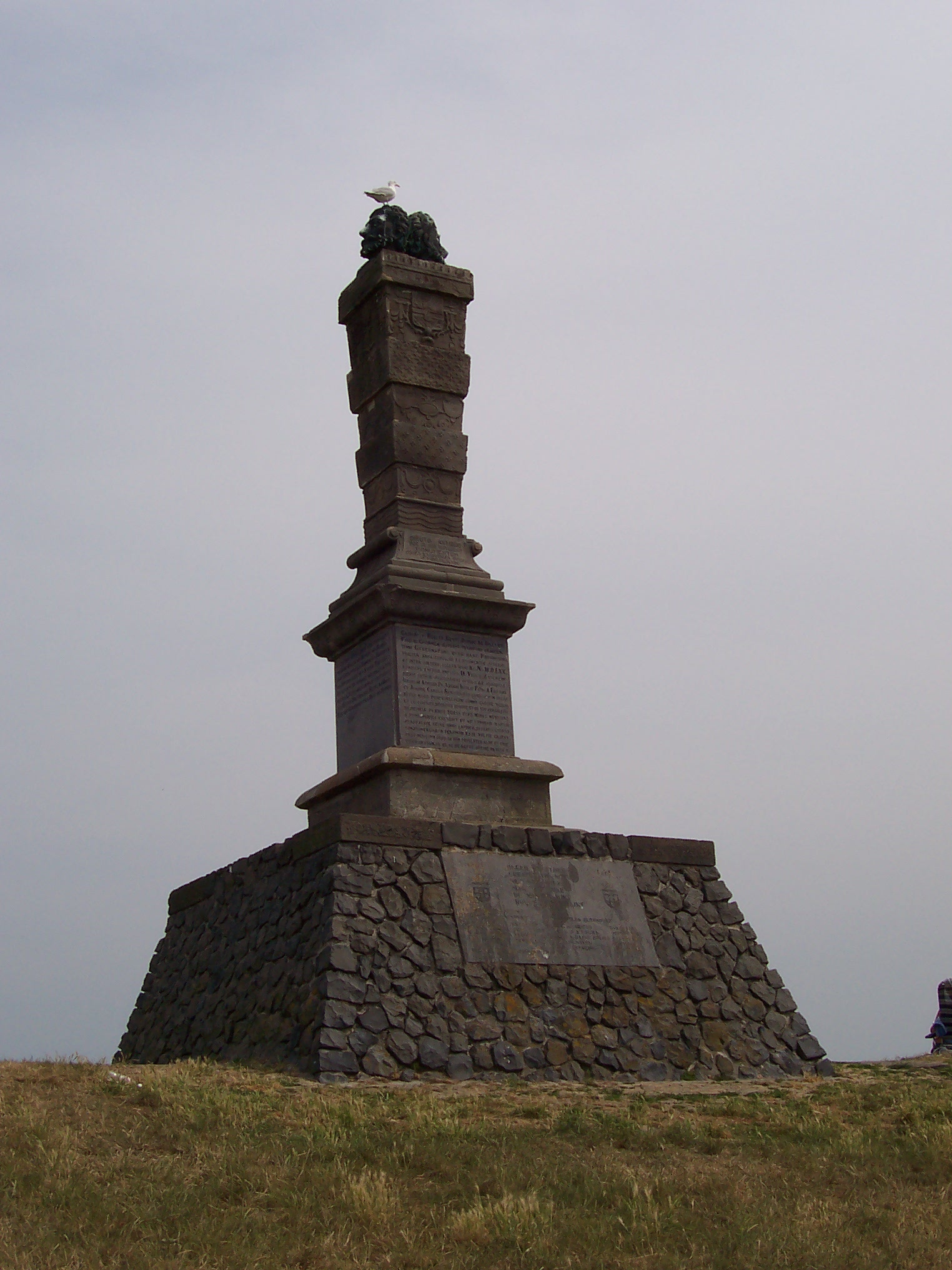
Stenen Man monument

On 1 November 1570, Friesland was devastated by the All Saints Flood which flooded almost the entire region. Major damage and broken dikes were the results. Dike repairs was urgently needed, but the Frisians could not agree on costs. Thanks to the efforts of de Robles it was quickly agreed to close and strengthen the dikes (especially around Harlingen). The work on the dikes was divided into two parts. The northern part was to be maintained by the Inner Dijkers and the southern part maintained by the Outer Dijkers.

When the work was done, the Inner Dijkers decided to construct a monument, marking the border of their territory. They chose to build a memorial pillar in honor of De Robles that came to be called the Stenen Man (English:Stone Man) (Frisian: Stiennen Man). This memorial column on the Westerburcht Zeedijk south of Harlingen for many years marked the boundary between the two water boards and can still be visited today. De Robles was also responsible for the construction of the Kolonelsdiep (Colonels-deep, named after him), between Bergumermeer and Briltil (west of Zuidhorn). This linked Leeuwarden and Groningen by a secure land fairway. It took three months to build and was used for 400 years, only being replaced in 1965 by a new canal.

== Decline ==
Over the years, Caspar de Robles was increasingly hated. The Spanish soldiers were already a month's pay behind and were very dissatisfied and he asked the Duke of Alva to be paid for his work. In 1576 he went to Groningen in order to soothe the feelings of the soldiers, but was captured by his own soldiers when Spain was declared bankrupt. That was the end of the power of Caspar de Robles in the north of the Netherlands.

Caspar de Robles died in 1585 at the Siege of Antwerp. During the siege the Spaniards had blocked the Schelde with a bridge of ships in order to starve the city. Dutch troops made several attempts to break through the blockade, but those attempts all failed. However, one of the attempts involved sending in two fire ships that were filled with gunpowder. The first ship exploded harmlessly against the shore, but the other reached the bridge and exploded with devastating force, instantly killing over 800 Spanish soldiers, and de Robles was one of the casualties.
