= Berlaimont =

- Commune
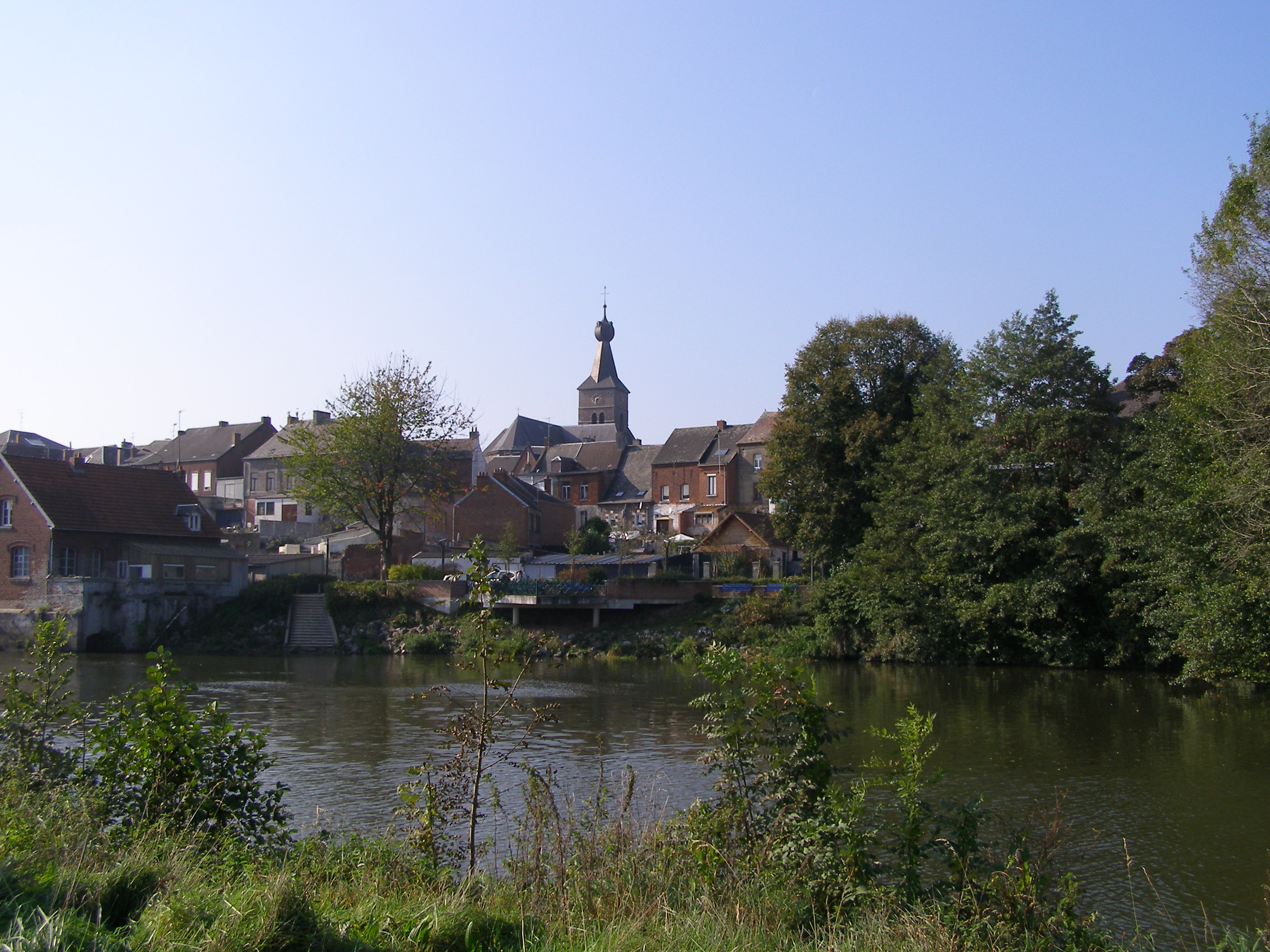
- A general view of Berlaimont

- Coat of arms
- Location of Berlaimont
- Location within France Location within Hauts-de-France
- Coordinates: 50°12′10″N 3°48′43″E
- Country: France
- Region: Hauts-de-France
- Department: Nord
- Arrondissement: Avesnes-sur-Helpe
- Canton: Aulnoye-Aymeries
- Intercommunality: CA Maubeuge Val de Sambre

Government
  - Mayor (2020–2026): Michel Hannecart
- Area^{1}: 13.10 km^{2} (5.06 sq mi)
- Elevation: 141 m (463 ft)
- Highest elevation: 172 m (564 ft)
- Lowest elevation: 125 m (410 ft)
- Population (2023): 3,159
  - Density: 241.1/km^{2} (624.6/sq mi)
- Time zone: UTC+01:00 (CET)
  - Summer (DST): UTC+02:00 (CEST)
- INSEE/Postal code: 59068 /59145
- ^{1} French Land Register data, which excludes lakes, ponds, glaciers > 1 km^{2} (0.386 sq mi or 247 acres) and river estuaries.

Berlaimont (French pronunciation: [bɛʁlɛmɔ̃]) is a commune in the Nord department in northern France.

== Population ==
Historical population

Year	Pop.	±% p.a.
1793	1,550	—
1821	1,827	+0.59%
1846	2,176	+0.70%
1872	2,755	+0.91%
1901	2,651	−0.13%
1926	3,156	+0.70%
1946	3,407	+0.38%
1962	3,811	+0.70%
1968	3,836	+0.11%

Year	Pop.	±% p.a.
1975	3,797	−0.15%
1982	3,532	−1.03%
1990	3,398	−0.48%
1999	3,229	−0.57%
2007	3,204	−0.10%
2012	3,146	−0.36%
2017	3,130	−0.10%
2023	3,159	+0.15%

Source: EHESS and INSEE (1968-2023)

== Heraldry ==
Arms of Berlaimont	The arms of Berlaimont are blazoned : Barry vair and gules. (Berlaimont and Busigny use the same arms.)

== See also ==
- Communes of the Nord department
