= Gillis van Berlaymont =

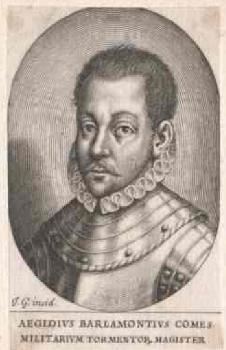

Gilles van Berlaymont (c. 1545 – 18 June 1579 in Maastricht) was stadtholder for the Spanish Crown of Drenthe, Friesland, Groningen and Overijssel (1572–1573), stadtholder of Guelders (1572–1577), substitute stadtholder of Holland, Zeeland and Utrecht (1574–1577), stadtholder of Namur and Artois (after 1578) and baron of Hierges.

He was the son of Charles de Berlaymont and Adriana de Ligne Barbançon, and a brother of Claude de Berlaymont and Florent de Berlaymont.
In 1572 he was made a Knight in the Order of the Golden Fleece, and on 2 September 1577 became a member of the Council of State.

In 1567 Gilles took part in the Siege of Valenciennes (1567), the first siege of the Eighty Years' War. He captured and sacked Schoonhoven, and Oudewater in August 1575. He was killed during the Siege of Maastricht (1579).
