= 1576 =

1576 in various calendars
- Gregorian calendar: 1576; MDLXXVI
- Ab urbe condita: 2329
- Armenian calendar: 1025; ԹՎ ՌԻԵ
- Assyrian calendar: 6326
- Balinese saka calendar: 1497–1498
- Bengali calendar: 982–983
- Berber calendar: 2526
- English Regnal year: 18 Eliz. 1 – 19 Eliz. 1
- Buddhist calendar: 2120
- Burmese calendar: 938
- Byzantine calendar: 7084–7085
- Chinese calendar: 乙亥年 (Wood Pig); 4273 or 4066 — to — 丙子年 (Fire Rat); 4274 or 4067
- Coptic calendar: 1292–1293
- Discordian calendar: 2742
- Ethiopian calendar: 1568–1569
- Hebrew calendar: 5336–5337
- Hindu calendars
- Vikram Samvat: 1632–1633
- Shaka Samvat: 1497–1498
- Kali Yuga: 4676–4677
- Holocene calendar: 11576
- Igbo calendar: 576–577
- Iranian calendar: 954–955
- Islamic calendar: 983–984
- Japanese calendar: Tenshō 4 (天正４年)
- Javanese calendar: 1495–1496
- Julian calendar: 1576; MDLXXVI
- Korean calendar: 3909
- Minguo calendar: 336 before ROC 民前336年
- Nanakshahi calendar: 108
- Thai solar calendar: 2118–2119
- Tibetan calendar: ཤིང་མོ་ཕག་ལོ་ (female Wood-Boar); 1702 or 1321 or 549 — to — མེ་ཕོ་བྱི་བ་ལོ་ (male Fire-Rat); 1703 or 1322 or 550

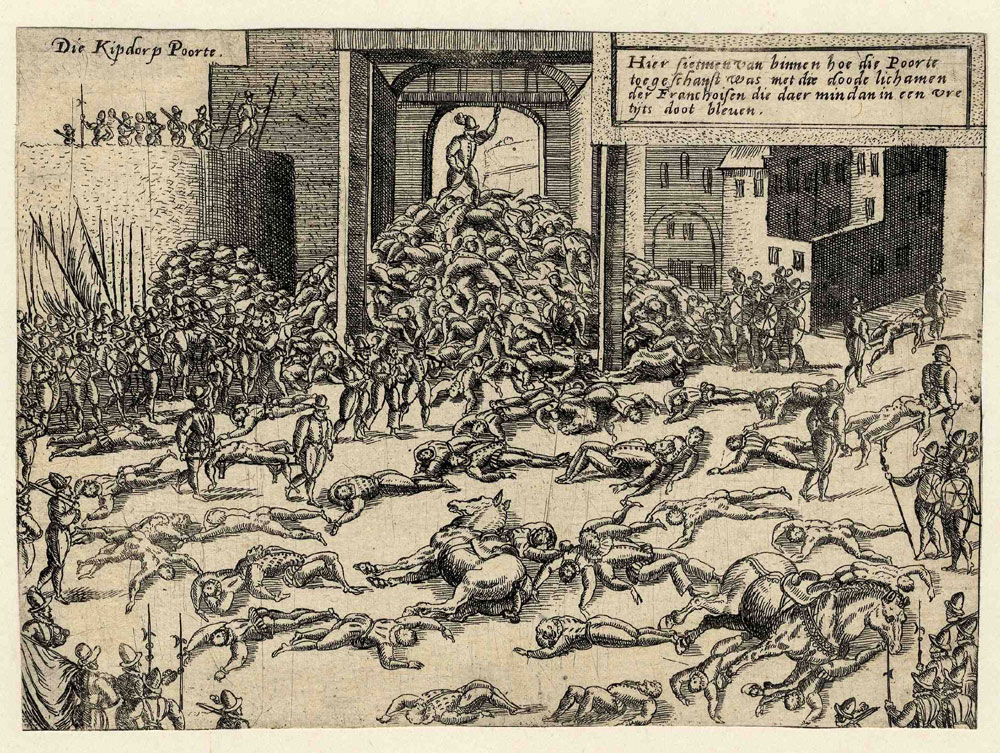
November 4: Sack of Antwerp

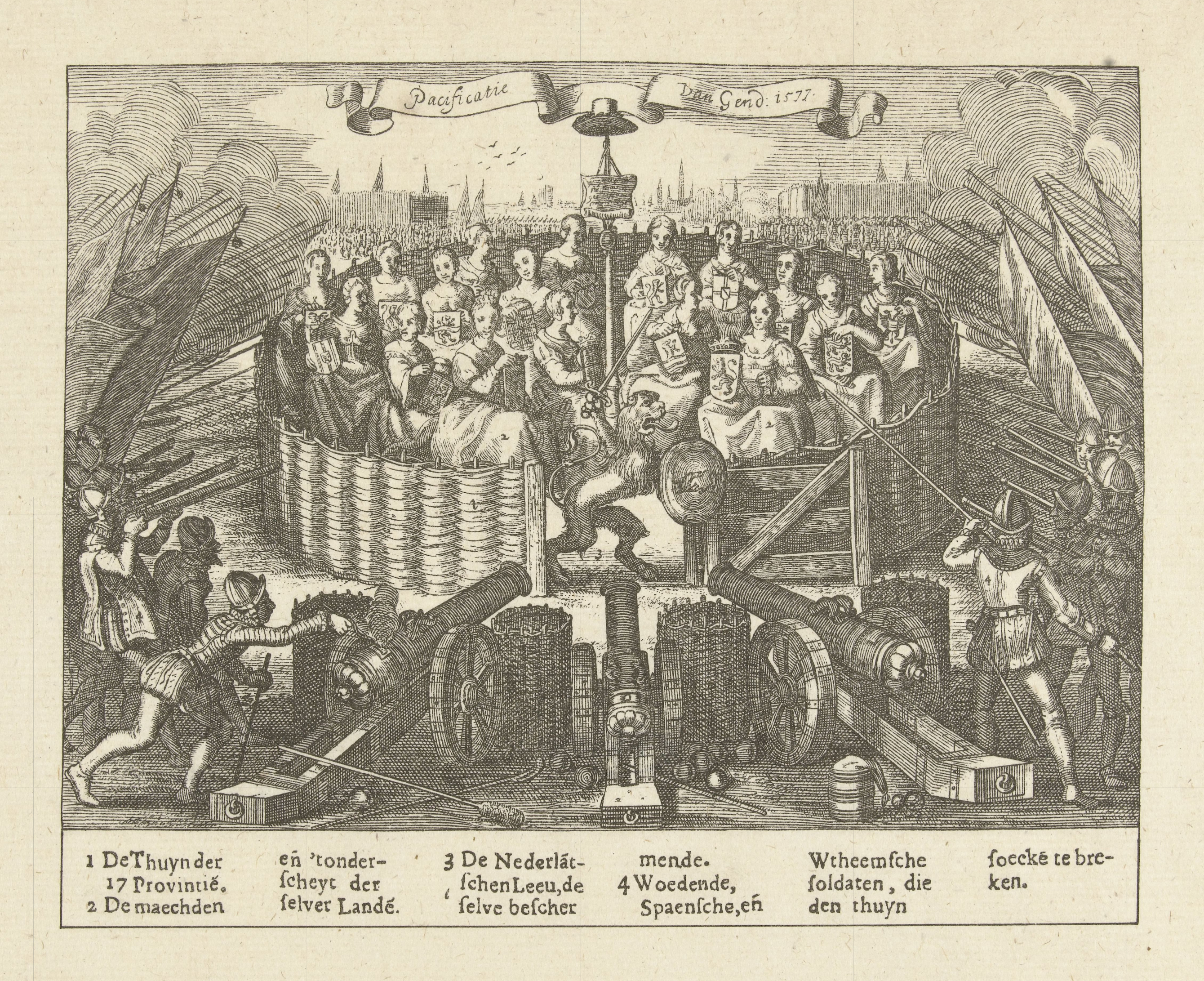
November 8: Pacification of Ghent

Year 1576 (MDLXXVI) was a leap year starting on Sunday of the Julian calendar.

== Events ==
=== January–March ===
- January 20 – Martín Enríquez de Almanza, Viceroy of New Spain, founds the settlement of León, in what is later the state of Guanajuato in Mexico.
- January 20 – The establishment of Roman Catholic Diocese of Macau.
- January 25 – Portuguese explorer Paulo Dias de Novais founds the settlement of São Paulo da Assumpção de Loanda on the southwestern coast of Africa, modern Luanda, capital of Angola.
- February 5 – King Henry of Navarre, captive in France since 1572 and alive only because he converted to Catholicism, escapes to Tours and formally reverts to the Protestant faith.
- February 8 – Peter Wentworth, a Puritan M.P. of the Parliament of England, is arrested in the middle of giving an address criticizing "rumours and messages" given to suppress freedom of speech. When he says that "the devil was the first author of them, from whom proceedeth nothing but wickedness", he is interrupted and taken to the Tower of London for imprisonment.
- March 11 – The city of Fez, part of the Saadi Sultanate in modern-day Morocco is captured by Ottoman forces led by Abd al-Malik, in an attempt to overthrow the Sultan Muhammed al-Mutawakkil and to make the Sultanate a vassal of the Ottoman Empire.

=== April–June ===
- April 14 – Ishiyama Hongan-ji War: In Japan, the Third Battle of Ishiyama begins as Oda Nobunaga sends 10,000 soldiers against the Ashikaga shogunate to capture the Honganji Temple.
- April 25 – Documents for the Union of Delft are signed by Dutch leader Willem van Oranj to create a federation of Holland and Zeeland.
- May 1 – Stephen Báthory, the Hungarian Prince of Transylvania, is crowned king of Poland.
- May 6 – The Edict of Beaulieu, negotiated by Monsieur Francois, Duke of Anjou and brother of King Henry III of France, ends the Fifth War of Religion. By the terms of the "Peace of Monsieur" that led to agreement on the Edict, freedom of worship is granted again to the Protestant Hugueonots.
- May 14 – Tahmasp I, the Shah of Safavid Iran for almost 52 years, is accidentally poisoned after being treated by the palace physician, Abu Naser Gilani. Tahmasp's death is followed by a deadly struggle for control of Iran.
- May 15 – Tahmap's son Haydar Mirza Safavi declares himself the new Safavid Shah of Iran, the day after the death of his father. Later in the day, Haydar is assassinated by members of the palace guard who are loyal to Haydar's brother, Ismail Mirza. Haydar attempts to disguise himself as a woman in the royal harem, but is discovered and beheaded.
- May 27 – An attempt by the Dutch Republic to end the Siege of Zierikzee and free the city from Spain fails after Spanish forces are tipped off about a surprise attack. Dutch Admiral Lodewijk van Boisot is killed in the battle.
- June 13 – Dutch forces withdraw to free Zierikzee, and the city is left to defend itself. The defenders then attempt negotiations with the Spanish attackers, commanded by General Cristóbal de Mondragón.
- June 18 – In the Battle of Haldighati in India, Mughal Imperial forces, led by Man Singh I of Amer, decisively defeat the Mewar Kingdom led by Maharana Pratap.

=== July–September ===
- July 4 – Alonso de Solís, who was appointed by Spain as Governor of the colony of La Florida, is killed in the colonial capital at San Augustin, the modern U.S. city of St. Augustine, Florida.
- July 11 – English navigator Martin Frobisher sights Greenland.
- July 12 – The Mughal Empire annexes Bengal after defeating the Bengal Sultanate at the Battle of Rajmahal.
- July 25 – Rebellious Spanish troops plunder the Flemish city of Aalst and then use it as their base of operations to attack other cities.
- July 29 – The Siege of Zierikzee in the Netherlands ends with the surrender of the defenders to the Spanish Army.
- August 11 – English navigator Martin Frobisher, on his search for the Northwest Passage through North America, enters the bay now named after him in Canada.
- August 23 – On the island of Kyūshū in Japan, near what is now Takaharu, Miyazaki prefecture, Takahara Castle of the Itō clan is captured by 30,000 men led by the warlord Shimazu Yoshihisa, after a siege of four days.
- September 1 – Ismail Mirza, who has proclaimed himself the Shah of Safavid Iran, marches into the capital at Qazvin and ascends the throne as Shah Ismail II.
- September 2 – Simeon Bekbulatovich, who has served since the previous October as the Grand Prince of All Russia after the Tsar Ivan IV ("Ivan the Terrible") had taken leave of absence from the throne, steps down as Ivan returns to Moscow. Ivan rewards Bekbulatovich with the title of Grand Prince of Tver.
- September 4 – In Brussels, rebels led by Jacques de Glymes of Brabant arrest the members of the Council of State that administers the city.
- September 8 – The States General of the Netherlands is convened by the leaders of the States of Brabant and the County of Hainaut in order to respond to mutineering Spanish troops.
- September 10 – After a siege that has lasted a year and two days, the Spanish Army abandons its siege of the Dutch city of Woerden.
- September 16 – The States of Flanders convene a meeting near Ghent, where the Roman Catholic clergy, led by Martinus Rythovius, insist on measures to protect the practice of the Catholic faith in the predominantly Protestant Low Countries.

=== October–December ===
- October 12 – Maximilian II, ruler of the Holy Roman Empire and most of Central Europe since 1564, dies suddenly in Regensburg while preparing for an Imperial invasion of Poland. Maximilian's 24-year-old son Rudolf, King of the Romans as well as the King of Hungary and of Bohemia, proceeds to Vienna to assume the Imperial Throne.
- October 20 – Spanish rebels plunder the city of Maastricht in Flanders and kill many of the civilian residents in what is later called the "Spaanse Furie" or Fury of Spain.
- October 26 – In Germany, Ludwig of Simmern becomes the new Elector Palatine of the Rhine 10 days after the death of his father, Frederick III, taking office at the Palatinate capital at Heidelberg as Ludwig VI.
- November 1 – Coronation of Rudolf II, Holy Roman Emperor.
- November 4 – Eighty Years' War – Sack of Antwerp: In the Low Countries, mutinous Spanish soldiers sack Antwerp; after three days the city is nearly destroyed.
- November 8 – Pacification of Ghent: The States General of the Netherlands meet and unite to oppose pillaging Spanish mutineers.
- November 9 – Shah Ismail II of Iran begins the execution of all persons whom he believes are a threat to his rule, starting with his half-brothers Suleiman Mirza, Governor of Shiraz, and Mustafa Mirza. Over the next seven months, Ismail arranges the execution of six other half-brothers, Mustafa, Junayd, Mahmud, Qoli, Ahmad, and Murza.
- December 6 – Representatives of France's three estates convene at the Estates General of 1576 in Blois at the invitation of King Henri III. Of the 383 delegates, the 187 of the Third Estate (commoners) narrowly vote in favor of outlawing Protestantism and expelling Protestant pastors from the kingdom, while the 110 of the First Estate (clergy) and 86 of the Second Estate (the nobility) strongly oppose ending hostility in the name of religious tolerance.
- December 19 – Representatives of the nobility of the Second Estate vote in favor of outlawing Protestantism in France.
- December 22 – Representatives of the clergy of the First Estate join the Second vote in favor of outlawing Protestantism. By January, the Edict of Beaulieu fails and the Sixth War of Religion begins later in 1577.
- December – James Burbage opens the first permanent public playhouse in Britain, The Theatre.

=== Date unknown ===
- The 1576 Cocoliztli epidemic causes millions of deaths in the territory of New Spain, in modern-day Mexico.
- An early example of autobiography is written in English, by Thomas Whythorne.
- The Loci Communes of Peter Martyr Vermigli (d. 1562), edited by Robert le Maçon, are published in London.
- The following schools are founded in England:
  - Dartford Grammar School, by William d'Aeth, Edward Gwyn and William Vaughn.
  - Sutton Valence School, by William Lambe.
- Konstanty Wasyl Ostrogski founds Ostroh Academy, the first university-level school in Eastern Europe.

== Births ==
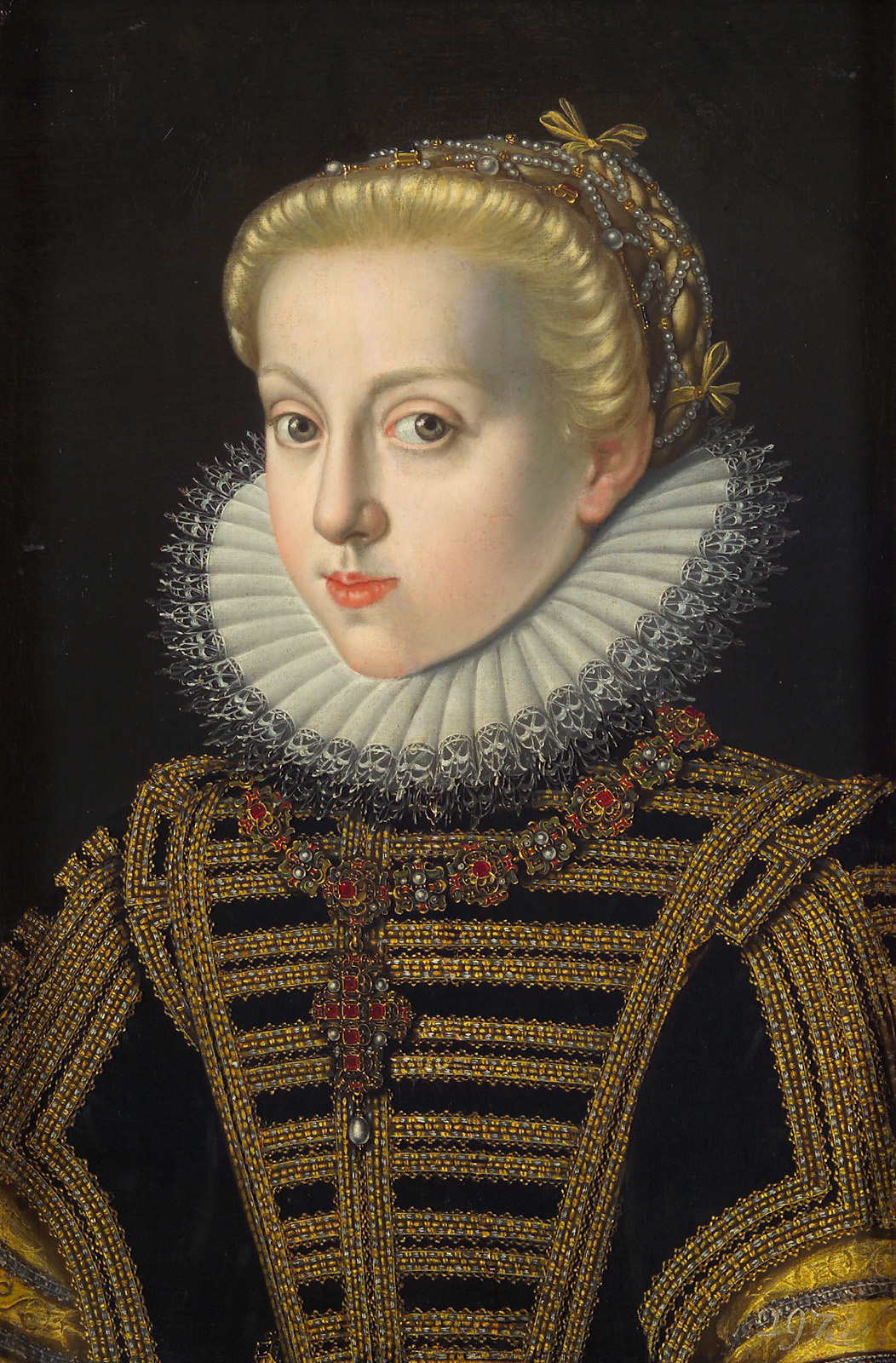
Archduchess Catherine Renata of Austria

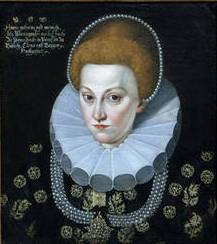
Duchess Anna of Prussia

- January 4 – Archduchess Catherine Renata of Austria, Austrian archduchess (d. 1599)
- January 5 – Anne Turner, English murderer (d. 1615)
- January 12 – Petrus Scriverius, Dutch writer and scholar on the history of Holland and Belgium (d. 1660)
- February 2 – Alix Le Clerc, French Canoness Regular and foundress (d. 1622)
- February 10 – Festus Hommius, Dutch theologian (d. 1642)
- February 29 – Antonio Neri, Italian chemist (d. 1614)
- March 14 – Eric of Lorraine, Bishop of Verdun (d. 1623)
- March 31 – Countess Louise Juliana of Nassau, countess consort and a regent of the Palatinate (d. 1644)
- May 17 – Joam Mattheus Adami, Italian Jesuit missionary (d. 1633)
- May 24 – Elizabeth Carey, Lady Berkeley, English courtier (d. 1635)
- May 27 – Caspar Schoppe, German controversialist and scholar (d. 1649)
- June 6 – Giovanni Diodati, Swiss-born Italian Calvinist theologian and translator (d. 1649)
- June 16 – Giovanni Battista Viola, Italian painter (d. 1622)
- July 3 – Duchess Anna of Prussia, Electress consort of Brandenburg and Duchess consort of Prussia (d. 1625)
- September 22 – Philipp of Bavaria, German Catholic cardinal (d. 1598)
- October – Thomas Weelkes, English composer and organist (d. 1626)
- October 6 – Roger Manners, 5th Earl of Rutland, eldest surviving son of John Manners (d. 1612)
- October 7 – John Marston, English writer (d. 1634)
- October 12 – Thomas Dudley, Governor of Massachusetts Bay Colony (d. 1653)
- October 28 – Rudolph, Prince of Anhalt-Zerbst, Prince of Anhalt (1586–1603), then Prince of Anhalt-Zerbst (1603–1621) (d. 1621)
- October 30 – Enrico Caterino Davila, Italian historian and diplomat (d. 1631)
- November 6 – Charles Günther, Count of Schwarzburg-Rudolstadt (1605–1630) (d. 1630)
- November 17 – Roque Gonzales, Paraguayan missionary (d. 1628)
- November 18 – Philipp Ludwig II, Count of Hanau-Münzenberg (1580–1612) (d. 1612)
- November 27 – Shimazu Tadatsune, Japanese ruler of Satsuma (d. 1638)
- December 20 – Saint John Sarkander, Moravian priest (d. 1620)
- date unknown
  - William Ames, English Protestant philosopher (d. 1633)
  - John Carver, first governor of Plymouth Colony (d. 1621)
  - Giulio Cesare la Galla, professor of philosophy at the Collegio Romano in Italy (d. 1624)
  - Santino Solari, Swiss architect and sculptor (d. 1646)
- probable – Jesper Mattson Cruus af Edeby, Swedish soldier and politician (d. 1622)

== Deaths ==
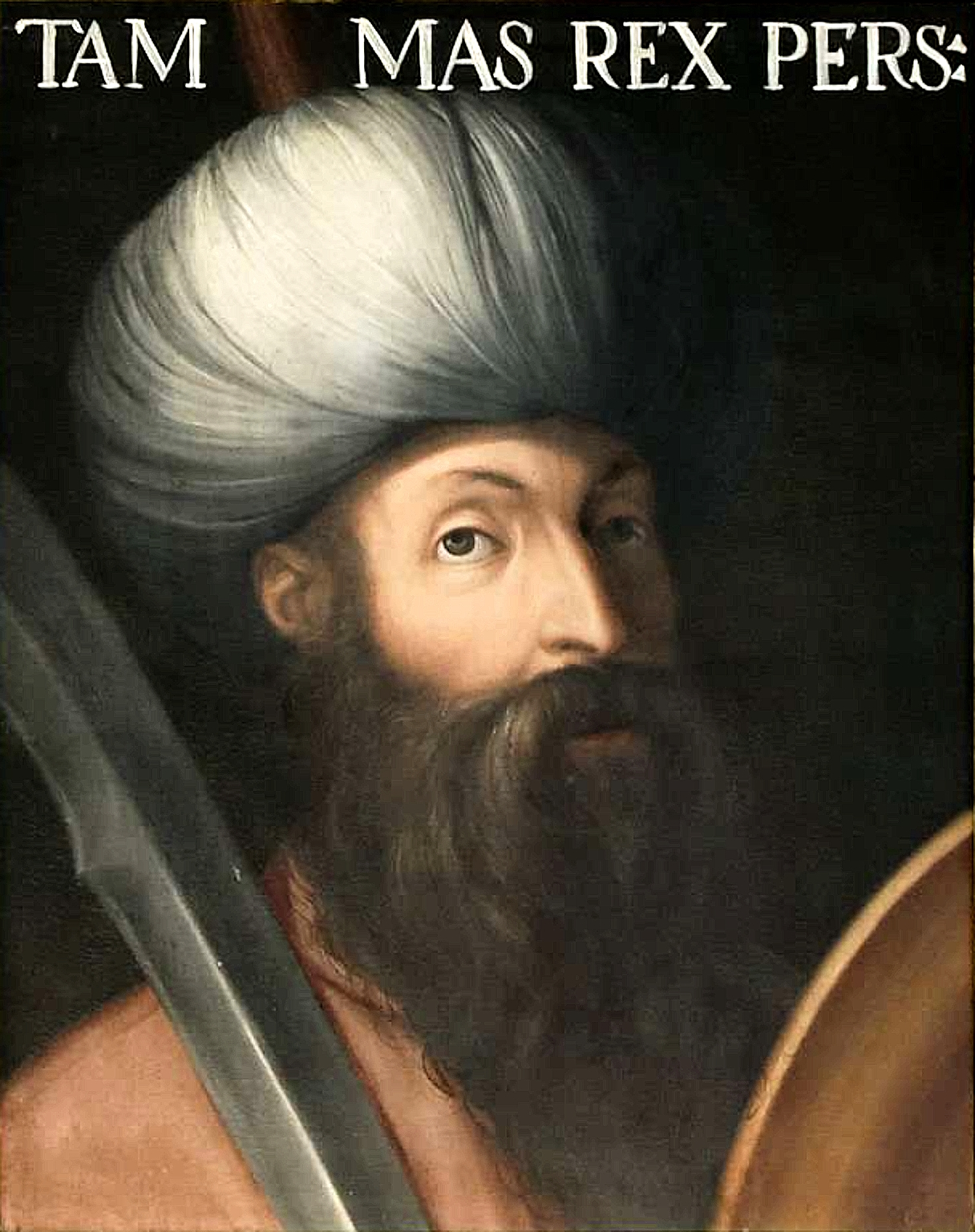
Tahmasp I

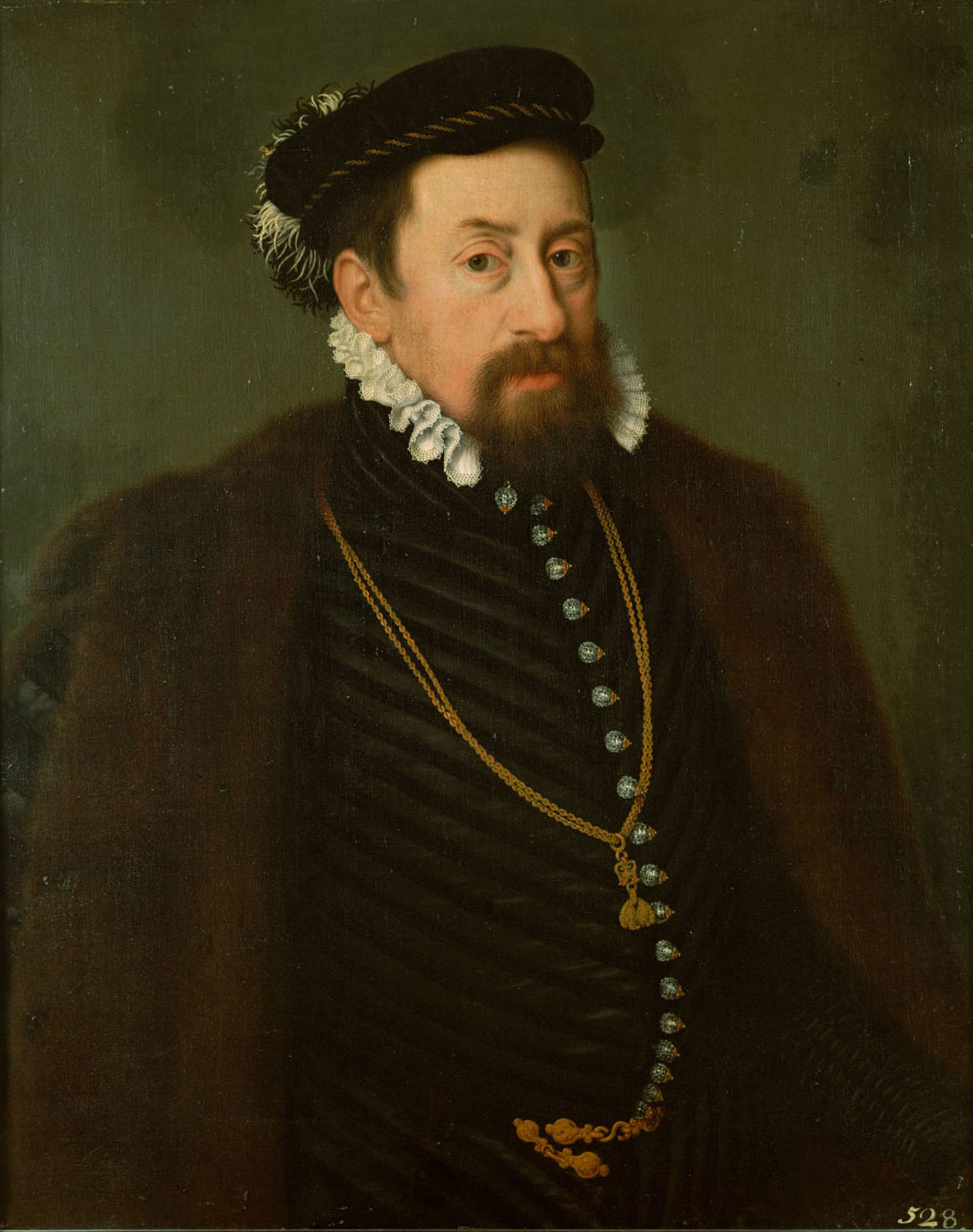
Maximilian II, Holy Roman Emperor

- January 19 – Hans Sachs, German Meistersinger (b. 1494)
- January 27 – Mizuno Nobumoto, Japanese shōgun
- February 10 – Wilhelm/Guilielmus Xylander, German classical scholar (b. 1532)
- February 12 – John Albert I, Duke of Mecklenburg (b. 1525)
- March 5 – Luis de Requesens y Zúñiga, Spanish governor of the Netherlands (b. 1528)
- March 18 – Johann Stössel, German theologian (b. 1524)
- May 14 – Tahmasp I, Shah of Persia (b. 1514)
- May 30 – Harada Naomasa, Japanese samurai
- June 30 – Franciscus Sonnius, Dutch counter-Reformation theologian (b. 1506)
- July 2 – Josias Simler, Swiss scholar (b. 1530)
- July 11 – Eleonora di Garzia di Toledo, Italian noble (d. 1553)
- July 16 – Isabella de' Medici, Italian noble (d. 1542)
- August 15 or August 22 – Bálint Bakfark, Hungarian composer and lutenist (b. 1507)
- August 27 – Titian, Italian painter (b. c. 1489)
- September 21 – Gerolamo Cardano, Italian mathematician, physician, astrologer and gambler (b. 1502)
- September 22 – Walter Devereux, 1st Earl of Essex (b. 1541)
- October 12 – Maximilian II, Holy Roman Emperor (b. 1527)
- October 14 – Konrad Heresbach, German Calvinist (b. 1496)
- October 26 – Frederick III, Elector Palatine, ruler from the house of Wittelsbach (b. 1515)
- November 4 – John Paulet, 2nd Marquess of Winchester (b. c. 1510)
- November 9 – Chamaraja Wodeyar IV, King of Mysore (b. 1507)
- date unknown
  - Paula Vicente, Portuguese artist, musician and writer (b. 1519)
- probable
  - Anthony More, Dutch portrait painter (b. 1512)
  - Nicola Vicentino, Italian music theorist and composer (b. 1511)
