= Yama (disambiguation) =

Yama is the Hindu deity of death, dharma, the south direction, and the underworld.

Yama may also refer to:

- Yama (Buddhism)
- Yama in world religions

Yama may also refer to:

== Places ==
- Yama, Burkina Faso
- Yama, Missouri, United States
- Yama District, Fukushima, Japan
- Yama (river), Magadan Oblast, Russia
- Yama, former name of Kingisepp, Russia
- Yama, former name of Siversk, Ukraine
- The Pit (memorial) (Belarusian: Яма Yama), a Holocaust memorial at the Minsk Ghetto, Belarus

== People ==
- Anup Kumar Yama (born 1984), Indian roller skate athlete
- Conrad Yama (1919–2010), American actor
- Gul Ahmmad Yama, Afghan presidential candidate
- Joam Yama (c. 1566 – 1633), Japanese Jesuit cleric
- Michael Yama (died 2020), American actor
- Mihoko Yama (born 1949), Japanese high jumper
- Peter Yama (born 1955), Papua New Guinean politician
- Vladyslav Yama (born 1982), Ukrainian dancer
- Yamamotoyama Ryūta, or Yama, Japanese sumo wrestler
- Yama (singer), Japanese singer

== Other uses ==
- Yāma, one of the six heavenly worlds in Buddhism
- Yamá, a trade language used by some Native American tribes around the Gulf of Mexico
- Yamas, ethical rules in Hinduism and Yoga
- Yama (album), by Art Farmer with Joe Henderson, 1979
- Yama: The Pit, a novel by Alexander Kuprin published in installments 1909–1915
- Yama, a Linux Security Module
- Yama, a song by Armin van Buuren & Vini Vici, 2021
- Yāmā (poetry collection), a Hindi poetry collection by Mahadevi Varma

== See also ==
- Yamma (disambiguation)
- Yamna (disambiguation)
- Yam (disambiguation)
- Yami (disambiguation)
- Yamuna (disambiguation)
- King of Hell (disambiguation)
- Yanwang (disambiguation)
- Yamudiki Mogudu (disambiguation)
