= Middelburg Abbey =

Middelburg Abbey (The Abbey of Our Lady)
- Abdij van Middelburg (Onze-Lieve-Vrouwe abdij)
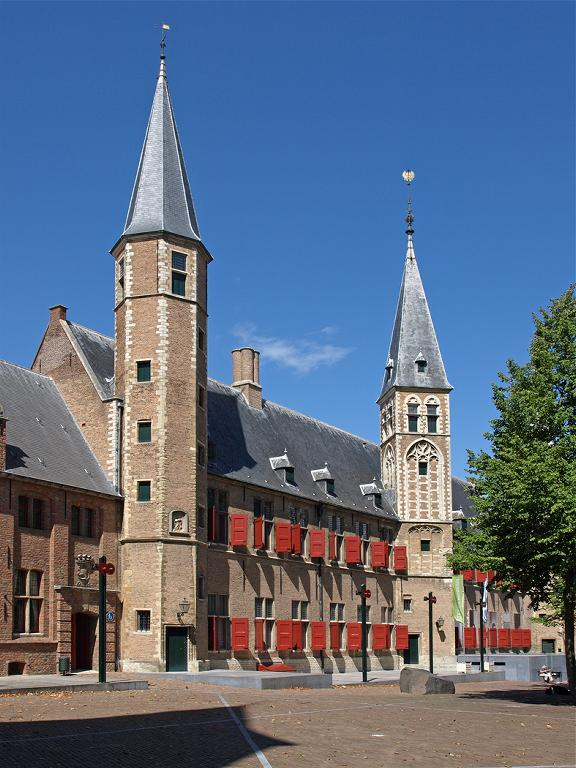
- The main surviving facade of Middelburg Abbey

- Location within Netherlands

General information
- Location: Middelburg, Netherlands
- Coordinates: 51°30′1″N 3°36′56″E

Middelburg Abbey (The Abbey of Our Lady) is a former Premonstratensian abbey in Middelburg, the Netherlands. At one time it was the centre of a large monastic complex.

Today parts of what survives are used for a museum and as offices. Located approximately 65 km (40 miles) west of Bergen op Zoom, Middelburg is the principal town and regional capital of Zeeland in the Netherlands.

== History ==
The origins of the abbey go back to the early twelfth century or earlier. Premonstratensian canons arrived from St. Michael's Abbey, Antwerp in 1127, creating a monastery on the site of a former Carolingian stronghold. The canons established a large religious foundation, eventually incorporating two churches. The monastic foundation also held extensive lands on Walcheren (then an island) and in Zeeland.

In 1401 the abbey was brought under direct papal control. Many of the monastic buildings were destroyed in a fire in 1492. Another fire, in 1568, was focused on the two monastic churches. Today many of the surviving buildings from the monastic period (including the so-called "new church") are in the late Medieval Gothic style, and date from a rebuilding in the second part of the sixteenth century.

An important sixteenth century abbot was Nicolaas van der Borcht who in 1559 became the first bishop in the newly formed (and short-lived) Diocese of Middelburg.

Monastic life came to an end in 1574 when the Spanish defenders under Cristóbal de Mondragón capitulated to the (Protestant) Dutch separatists at the end of the two year Siege of Middelburg. While negotiating the surrender of the town William of Orange had given guarantees that the clergy would be left alone, but both the abbey and Catholicism in Middelburg were nevertheless forcibly terminated.

Meanwhile, the abbey was renamed as the "Hof van Zeeland" and taken over for use in the secular administration of the province. Initially it was used as the seat of the district assembly ("Staten van Zeeland") and for other administrative bodies including the locally important admiralty (naval) department, a mint, and a court chamber. Following extensive administrative reforms during the Napoleonic occupation, in 1812 the former abbey complex became known as the "Province Building" ("Provinciehuis"). The abbey church was badly damaged in May 1940 by German aerial bombers targeting Middelburg in order to persuade the Dutch army not to hold out against German invasion: during the years of austerity that followed the war rebuilding was not completed till 1965. Other abbey buildings continued to accommodate government activities till the end of the twentieth century, such as the land registry and state archive. Since 1972 a part of the complex has housed the Zeeland Museum, and in 1986 the "Roosevelt Study Center" moved into another part.

== The churches ==
To the south of the cloisters are two Protestant churches which are today still referred to as "Abbey Churches", reflecting their monastic origins. From the outside they are contiguous, though on the inside it is no longer possible to move from one to the other without leaving the building.

=== Choir church (Koorkerk) ===
Around 1300 the abbey's old church building was replaced with the Choir church (Koorkerk), which is physically divided from adjacent New Church. The church comprises a tall chancel of seven arches in length, with a five sided apse to the east of the choir stalls. As part of the rebuilding after its destruction by fire in 1568, elaborate roof vaulting was added.

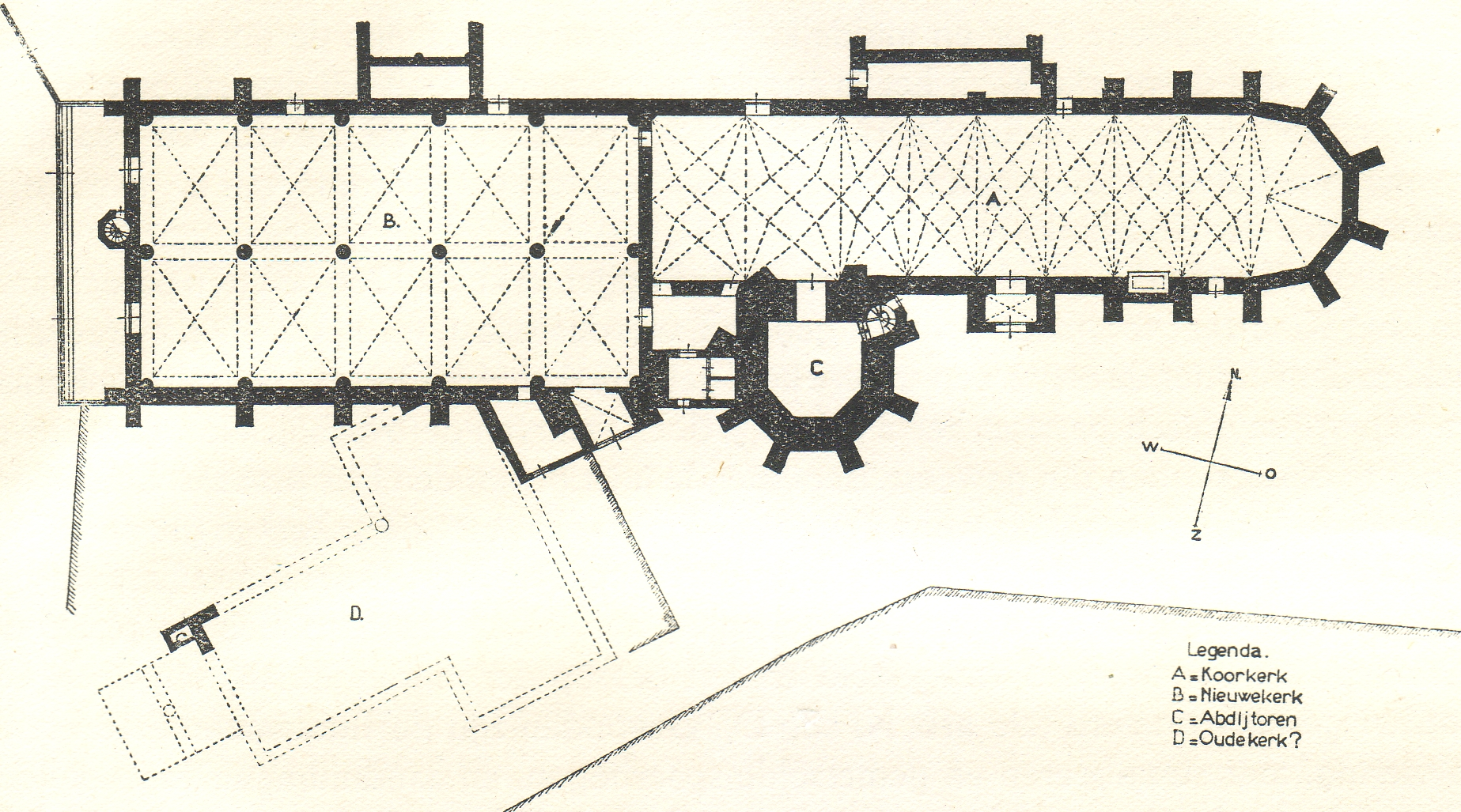
Plan of the contiguous New church and Choir church in Middelburg A. (east end) Choir church B. (west end) New church C. (south side) Abbey tower D. (dotted) ?former abbey

A prominent feature of the town's profile is the abbey church tower known as "Lange Jan" ("Tall John") on the southside of the Choir church. The lower part of the tower dates from the fourteenth century. The more elaborate higher parts were added in 1712 and then reconstructed following the destruction of 1940.

=== New church (Nieuwe Kerk) ===
The New church (51°29'58.96"N 3°36'53.08"E) features a double nave. In its present configuration it dates from the rebuilding that followed the fire of 1558. It replaced an earlier church built around 1300 which also featured a twin nave despite being smaller. The eastern wall of the New church is also the western wall of the Choir church, and the two interiors were originally connected through an arch, but this was subsequently blocked up. After 1833 the New church became the only parish church for the central walled area of Middelburg.

The designation "New church" was used to differentiate this building from two older churches in Middelburg: the West Minister church(demolished in 1575) and the North Minister church (demolished in 1834).

The "New church" is notable for its organ, which was built in 1954 by Pels & Van Leeuwen, a firm from Leiderdorp. More eye-catching is the housing that accommodates it, which was originally created in 1693 for a church in Amsterdam by the carpenter-craftsman Jan Albertsz Schut. The organ casing was extensively restored in 1996, the action of the organ itself in 2004.
