= Siege of Middelburg (1572–1574) =

1572 siege

- Part of the Eighty Years' War
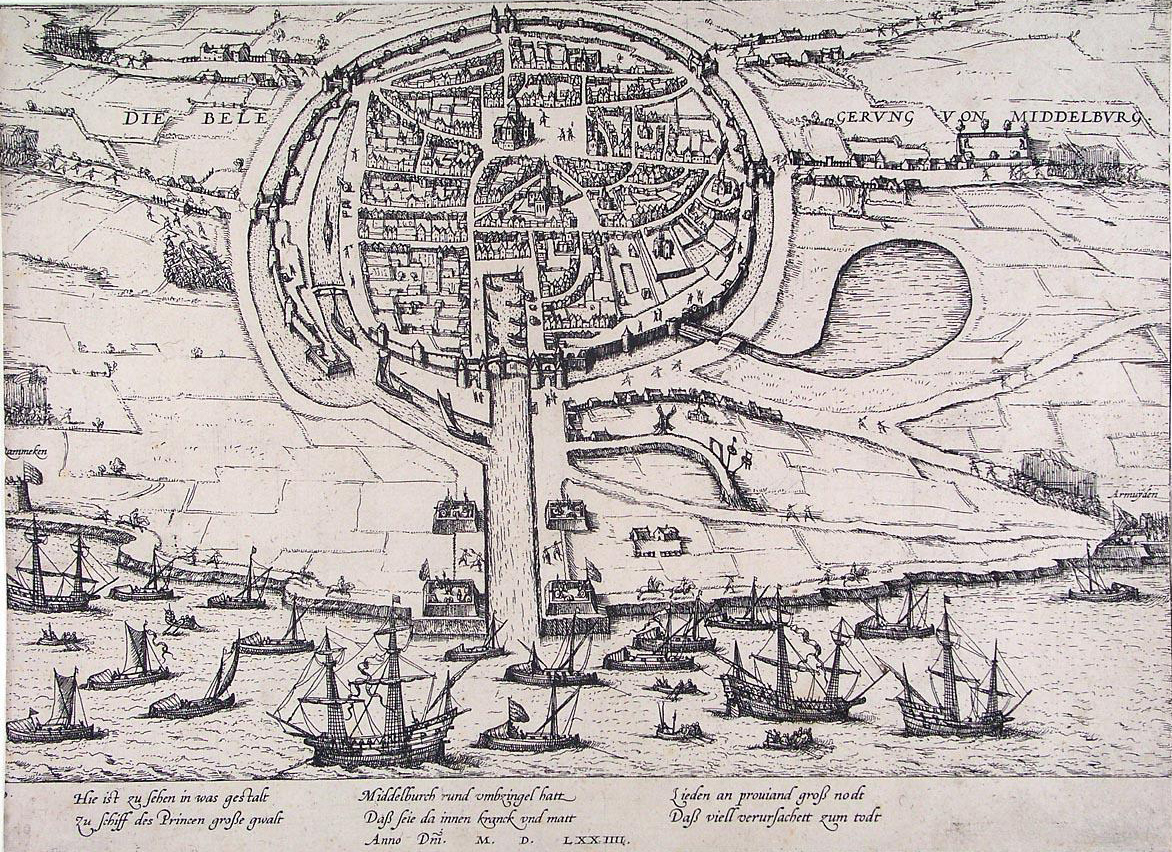
- Map of the Siege of Middelburg by Frans Hogenberg
Date	4 November 1572 – 18 February 1574
Location	Middelburg (Present-day Netherlands) 51°30′N 3°37′E
Result	Dutch rebels victory

Belligerents
Dutch rebels	Spain

Commanders and leaders
William of Orange; Jerome de Tseraarts; Thomas Morgan	(Spain) Cristóbal de Mondragón (Spain) Antoine of Burgundy

Strength
5,000	3,000

Casualties and losses
Unknown; Many to disease	Heavy; Surrender of garrison

The siege of Middelburg (1572–1574) lasted over a year during the Eighty Years' War. A Dutch rebel army besieged Middelburg, which was being held by Spanish forces under Cristóbal de Mondragón, on 4 November 1572. The Spanish held out and only capitulated on 18 February 1574, when news arrived that a relief effort to save Middelburg was defeated at Rimmerswiel.

== Background ==
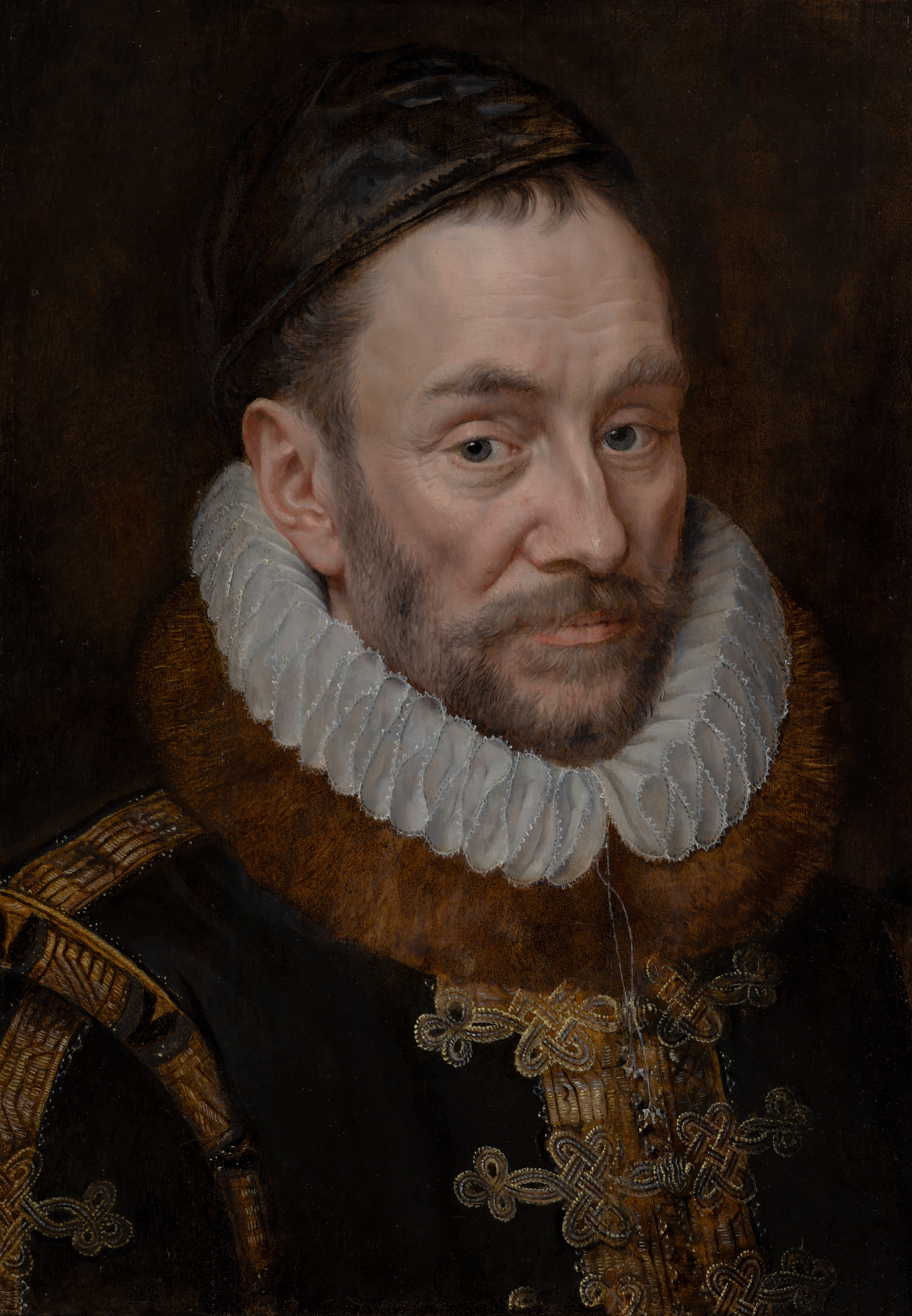
Stadtholder William of Orange

Philip II of Spain had inherited the Seventeen Provinces of the Netherlands upon his accession, but his policies soon led to local discontent. By 1568, William I of Orange, stadtholder of Holland, Zeeland, and Utrecht, and other noblemen were dissatisfied with Spanish rule in the Netherlands. A series of revolts emerged against the Spanish authorities, mainly caused by religious and economic impositions on the Dutch population who also sought to end the harsh rule of the Spanish Duke of Alba, governor-general of the Netherlands. The Dutch rebels hoped to expel Alba and his Spanish troops from the country and as a result hostilities increased, leading to the Eighty Years' War. In April 1572, the Sea Beggars, Dutch rebels captured Brielle which caused a sensation, and a chain reaction of events took place especially on Walcheren island. After Brielle had been captured, this soon led to the seizure of the town of Flushing. Other cities in the province of Zeeland soon joined the rebels, and by mid-1572 only Arnemuiden and Middelburg, on the island of Walcheren, and Goes, on the island of Zuid-Beveland, remained under Spanish control. All of these would be besieged by the Dutch forces under William of Orange, with the support of English troops sent by Elizabeth I.

The rebels wreaked havoc by looting properties and torching churches with many of the villages on the island falling into their hands, and also towns like Arnemuiden and Veere were handed over by the inhabitants sympathetic to the rebel cause.

During the uprising Middelburg still had a strong Spanish garrison and at the end of April 1572 an attempted assault was made consisting of around 1,100 Dutch rebels led by Jerome Tseraerts. Due to a lack of resources and support they pulled back after a day of suffering losses where they then resorted to looting the outside of the city. In June another attempt was made again, this time by only a hundred Dutch rebels. Led by Bernard Nicholas the storming attempt was successful as the outer defenses were seized but soon after a sortie by the garrison managed to drive the Dutch out. Middelburg was not yet besieged and the Spanish were able to supply the city without any hindrance. On 4 November nearly 1,500 Dutch and English under Jerome Tseraerts and Bartholt Entens van Mentheda, who just returned from the failed siege of Goes, arrived on the island of Walcheren and then made plans to besiege Middelburg.

== Siege ==
The waterways around the city were soon blocked, which soon caused supplies to run low for the Middelburg inhabitants. The rebels included an English regiment under Thomas Morgan, a few Scots ensigns, and a number of untrained recruits from England.

Tseraerts was commissioned to be Lieutenant-Governor of the whole of the island of Walcheren if he succeeded in his task of taking the city. The rebels soon appeared at the castle of Westhoven, located on the east of the city, Tseraerts led an assault which it captured, then plundered an abbey and then set it on fire. The governor of Walcheren, Antoine of Burgundy, wrote repeatedly to the Duke of Alba, Governor of the Netherlands, on behalf of Philip II of Spain to report on the situation in the city which was becoming increasingly difficult with the siege. Alba ordered Cristóbal de Mondragón to go to Middelburg and destroy the Anglo-Dutch siege positions and restore the supply lines. Mondragón meanwhile was to take over the administration of the city itself and as a result Antoine of Burgundy stepped down to become the mayor of Middelburg.

In early December Sancho d'Avila arrived from Antwerp, the Duke of Alba, ordered him to send reinforcements by sea. He assembled a fleet at Breskens and hoped to capture Flushing from the Beggars and seize the waterways in Walcheren from the rebels. D'Avila also sent some companies via land to Middelburg and managed to supply the city. He was on his way to Flushing but was intercepted and defeated there by Lieven Keersmaker losing five ships.

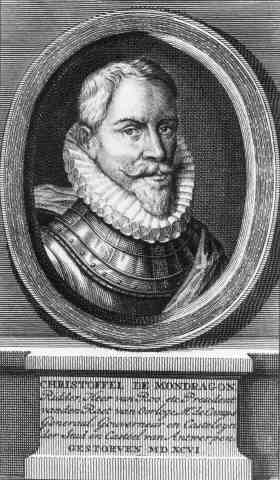
Spanish commander Cristóbal de Mondragón

=== 1573 ===
At the beginning of 1573 the Dutch managed to capture the castle at Popkensburg, just outside the northern part of Middelburg. Meanwhile, within the city walls food shortages were strongly felt as the bitter winter lasted. As well as the population suffering, the Spanish soldiers too had very little in terms of consumption. People in the city that were of little use, such as paupers and people dying of disease, were left outside to save food. In late July after the failure to relieve Haarlem William of Orange took over proceedings from Tseraerts.

On 5 August the nearby Fort Rammekens was assaulted and captured by the Dutch and English led by Jacobus Schotte and gradually the strong points were being conquered one by one. Around Christmas the food shortage was so dire that between 1,000 and 1,500 civilians and soldiers died by the end of the year.

=== 1574 ===
The situation was desperate in January 1574 with Middelburg still besieged, the Duke of Alba was recalled by the Spanish king and was replaced by Don Luis de Requesens. De Requesens ordered the relief of Middelburg and he assembled a fleet of seventy ships under Julian Romero at Bergen op Zoom in addition from Antwerp, Sancho d'Avila with a hundred ships would join Romero. The operation however was a fiasco; they departed but before they even got to Middelburg they were set upon by the Sea Beggars who boarded all sides of the ships. Not one ship managed to make it to Middelburg and this was a huge blow to the Spanish.

In early February, the city for at least twelve days had no food; Mondragón sent several messengers to Requesens, but never got an answer back because the messengers with letters were intercepted. On 4 February Mondragón received a personal message from William of Orange; he had to surrender the city within four days. Meanwhile, to add to Mondragón's woes there was a bigger influx of Dutch, English, and Scots troops who now surrounded the city.

=== Capitulation ===
The hardened Mondragón refused to surrender and as a sign he set fire to a few houses and sent a messenger to William to let him know that dozens of locations in the city would be set on fire and he would go down fighting. William of Orange came up with a compromise and proposed a negotiation in Fort Rammekens with the conditions; an honorable capitulation and a 'retreat' with arms & colors. Mondragón was now concerned about the inhabitants given the light of recent events of which he was fully aware of the Spanish massacres of the populaces of Haarlem, Naarden, and Zutphen ordered by the Duke of Alba. He pleaded with the Prince that the inhabitants and the clergy were not to be harmed, and when this was agreed both William of Orange and Mondragón signed a transfer on 18 February. On 23 February the now ill-fed poorly-equipped Spanish garrison left the city of Middelburg along with the Catholic clergy.

== Aftermath ==
With the surrender of Middelburg, the whole of the island of Walcheren, which commands the two mouths of the Scheldt, was finally lost to the Dutch and English. The town of Leiden, which had been invested by the Spanish since November 1573, still held out for William of Orange. Mondragón took his defeated and later mutinous army to Beveland and the following year he captured Duiveland and then took Zierikzee. After the siege was over Jacobus Schotte was rewarded by William of Orange and was appointed mayor of Middelburg.

George Gascoigne an English soldier-poet who took part in the siege received a 300 gulden above his pay by William for his part in the Spanish surrender.
Observing the capitulation Gascoigne wrote a poem:

‘And when Mountdragon might no more endure

He came to talk and rendred all at last,
With whom I was within the Citie sure,
Before he went, and on his promisse past,
So trust I had to thinke his fayth was fast
I dinde, and supt, and laye within the towne
A daye before he was from thence ybowne.’
