= Yaman =

Yaman may refer to:

- Yaman (name), people with the given name or surname
- Yaman (raga), a raga in Hindustani classical music
- Yaman (film), a 2017 Indian film
- Yaman (tribal group), an Arab tribal confederation

== Places ==
- Yaman, variant transliteration of Yemen
- Yaman, Iran, a village in Iran
- Yaman, Mudanya, Turkey

== See also ==
- "Dle Yaman", a traditional Armenian song rearranged by Komitas
- Yattaman, a Japanese television show
- Yemen (disambiguation)
- Yamin (disambiguation)
