= Yemin (disambiguation) =

Yemin is a 2019 Turkish TV series.

Yemin may also refer to:

- Yemin Moshe, neighborhood of Jerusalem

== See also ==
- Yemen (disambiguation)
- Yamin (disambiguation)
