= Yamuna (disambiguation) =

The Yamuna is a river in India.

It can also refer to:

- Yamuna in Hinduism
- Yamunacharya (10th century), an Indian philosopher
- Yamuna (film), a 2013 Indian Tamil-language film
- Yamuna (TV series), an Indian Tamil-language TV series
- SS Yamuna, a British India Line passenger ship
- Yamuna (actress), an Indian actress who appeared in Telugu, Kannada films and serials
- Yamuna Devi, author of The Art of Indian Vegetarian Cooking
- Yamuna Bank metro station, of the Delhi Metro on the Yamuna river
- Yamuna Vihar, neighbourhood of North East Delhi, Delhi, India
  - Yamuna Vihar Assembly constituency
  - Yamuna Vihar metro station, of the Delhi Metro

== See also ==
- Jamuna (disambiguation)
- Yamini (disambiguation)
- Yami (disambiguation)
- Yama (disambiguation)
