= Wang Yan =

Wang Yan or Wangyan may refer to:

== People ==
- Wang Yan (Jin dynasty) (256–311), politician and pure talk leader of the Jin dynasty (266–420)
- Wang Zongyan (899–926), known as Wang Yan after 918, emperor of Former Shu
- Wang Yan (entrepreneur) (born 1972), Chinese entrepreneur and co-founder of Sina Corp
- Wang Yan (actress) (born 1974), Chinese actress
- Wang Yan (activist) (born 1986), Chinese animal welfare activist

=== Sportspeople ===
- Wang Yan (racewalker) (born 1971), Chinese race walker
- Wang Yan (cyclist) (born 1974), Chinese cyclist
- Wang Yan (skier) (born 1974), Chinese cross-country skier
- Wang Yan (footballer) (born 1991), Chinese footballer
- Wang Yan (tennis) (born 1996), Chinese tennis player
- Wang Yan (gymnast) (born 1999), Chinese gymnast
- Wang Yan (judoka) (born 1994), Chinese judoka
- Wang Yan (archer) (born 2000), Chinese archer

== Places in China ==
- Wangyan, Anhui (王堰), a town Funan County, Anhui
- Wangyan, Shaanxi (王阎), a town in Shanyang County, Shaanxi

== See also ==
- Yan Wang (disambiguation)
- Wang Yang (disambiguation)
