= Yami (disambiguation) =

Yami is a Hindu mother goddess or Tibetan death goddess.

Yami may also refer to:

- Yami people, also known as the Tao, in Taiwan
  - Yami language, their Austronesian language
- Yami Gautam (born 1988), Indian actress
- Y'ami Island, another name for Mavudis, an island in Batanes, Philippines
- Yami Sukehiro, a character from Black Clover
- Yami Yugi, a character from Yu-Gi-Oh!
- Yami, the main villain and final boss in the video games Ōkami and Tatsunoko vs. Capcom
- a nickname for the character Golden Darkness in the To Love Ru manga series

== See also ==
- Yamini (disambiguation)
- Yama (disambiguation)
- Yamuna (disambiguation)
- Yami Qaghan (disambiguation)
