= Yamini =

Yamini may refer to:

- Yamini (given name), an Indian given name (including a list of people with the name)
- Yamini (film), a 1973 Malayalam-language film
- Yaamini, a 2001 Indian Malayalam-language film, starring Shakeela
- Yamini (music festival), a Bangalore music festival
- Yamini dynasty, another name for the Ghaznavid dynasty of southern Asia
  - Tarikh Yamini or Kitab i Yamini, an Arabic history of the reigns of the Ghaznavid rulers Sebuktigin and Mahmud up to 1020
- Yami, the first woman in Vedic beliefs, sometimes called Yāmīnī
- Yamini, fictional character in the 2026 Indian film Udta Teer, portrayed by Sara Ali Khan

== See also ==
- Amini (disambiguation)
- Yamin (disambiguation)
- Yami (disambiguation)
