= Siege of Groenlo (1595) =

1595 siege

- Part of the Eighty Years' War & the Anglo–Spanish War
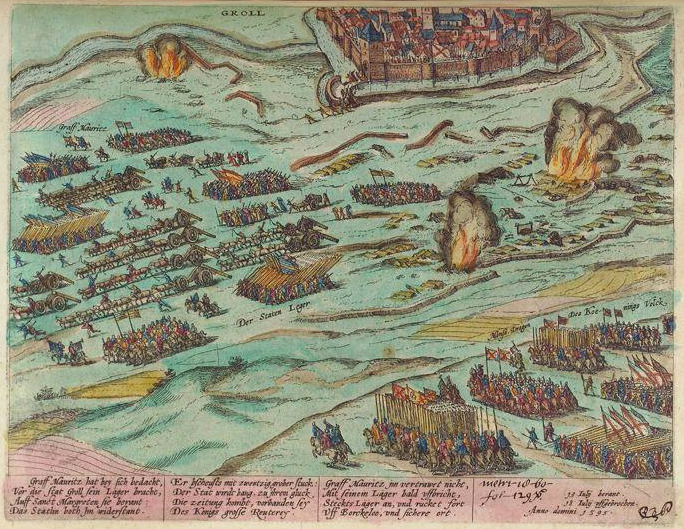
- View of the siege of Groenlo in 1595
Date	14–24 July 1595
Location	Groenlo, Gelderland (present-day the Netherlands) 52°03′00″N 6°37′00″E
Result	Spanish victory

Belligerents
Dutch Republic; England	(Spain) Spanish Empire

Commanders and leaders
(Dutch Republic) Maurice of Nassau (England) Francis Vere	(Spain) Cristóbal de Mondragón (Spanish Tercios) (Spain) Jan van Stirum (In Groenlo)

Strength
6,000 infantry 200–300 cavalry 16 artillery pieces	(Spanish Tercios); 7,000 infantry 1,300 cavalry (In Groenlo); 600 infantry
- Location within Netherlands Siege of Groenlo (1595) (North Sea)

The siege of Grol or Groenlo in 1595 was a siege of Groenlo by States forces under Maurice of Nassau during the Eighty Years' War in an attempt to capture it from the Spanish Empire. It lasted from 14 to 24 July 1595, ending with the arrival of a Spanish relief force under Cristóbal de Mondragón and Maurice's retreat. Two years later, in 1597, Maurice returned to carry out another siege of Groenlo. Both these sieges formed part of what would later be called the Ten Glorious Years.

== Context ==
The fortified town of Grol, present-day Groenlo, was a small, but relatively important stronghold along the eastern border of the Dutch Republic. Groenlo formed a crucial link between the Dutch cities that were members of the Hanseatic League, such as Deventer, Kampen, Zwolle, and Zutphen, and the Holy Roman Empire. Situated in a difficultly passable region, Groenlo developed extensive fortifications that from the late Middle Ages were constantly improved, so that by 1595 the medieval brick city wall was itself surrounded with moats and bastions and armed with cannons. In 1580, after the Spanish took control of the provinces of Friesland, Groningen, Drenthe, and Overijssel, Groenlo, which itself lay in the bordering province of Guelders, was taken over by Spanish troops as well. From 1581 onwards, a Spanish garrison was stationed in the city.

Meanwhile, Maurice of Orange, then the stadtholder of Holland, Zeeland, and Utrecht, had launched an offensive against the Spanish forces, led by Alexander Farnese, Duke of Parma, to retake the Dutch forts and cities that were in Spanish hands. As a result, Maurice managed to take Breda, Deventer, and Zutphen between 1590 and 1593. In 1594, Maurice started to plan a campaign to retake the cities of Twente, such as Enschede, Oldenzaal, and Lingen. To form a bridgehead into Twente, Maurice planned a siege on Groenlo, despite discouragements of Maurice's nephew and military advisor, William Louis, Count of Nassau-Dillenburg, who thought that the fortifications of the city were as good as impregnable. William Louis advised Maurice to lay siege to Lingen instead, but Maurice wove his critique aside and started the preparations for his plans anyway. Maurice had great difficulty to find enough funds and troops for his plans, whereby the campaign into Twente did not start until 1595, when the siege of Groenlo finally begun.

== Siege ==
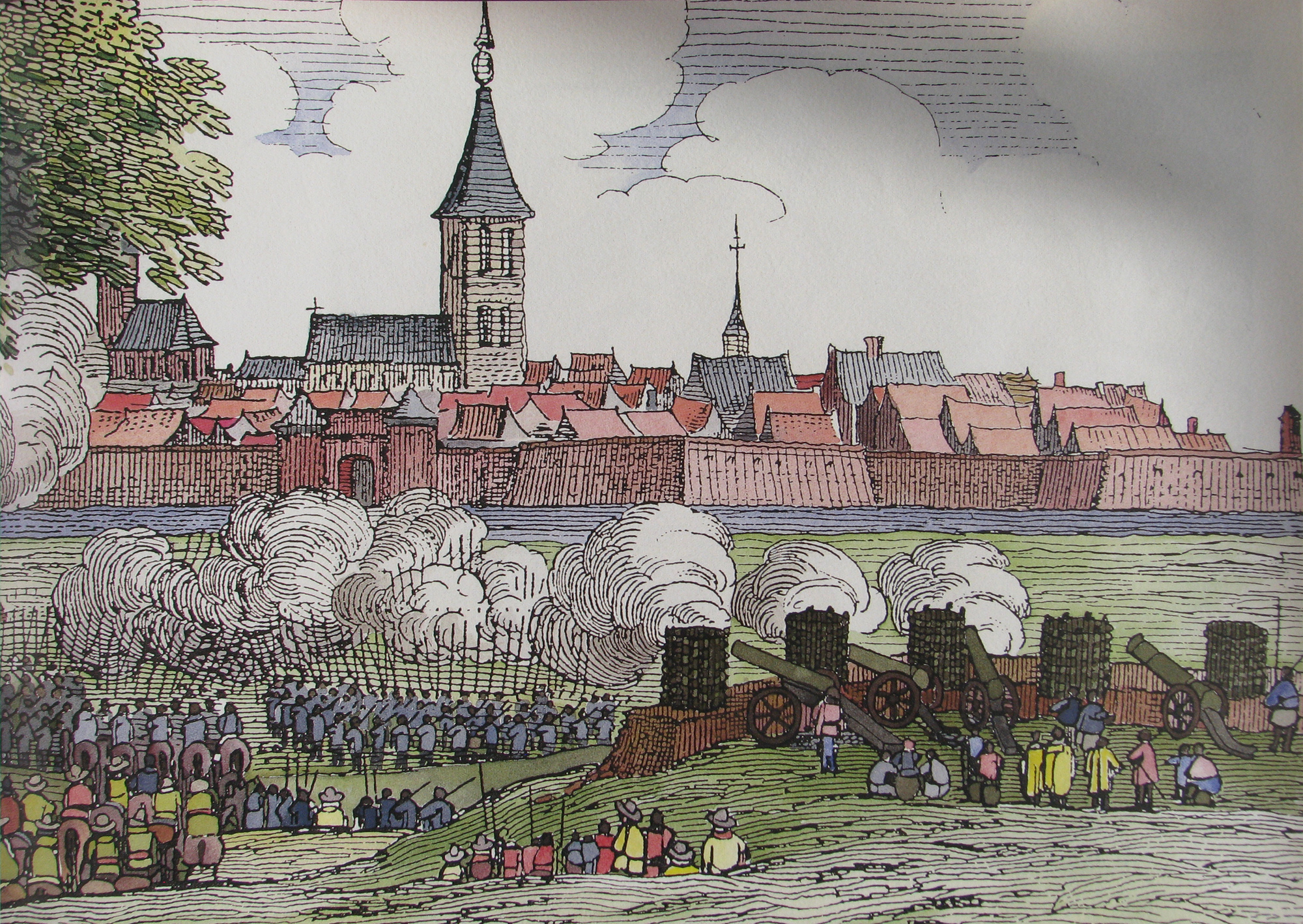
An artist's impression of the siege

The siege started on 14 July, with the arrival of Maurice at Groenlo, along with 6000 foot soldiers, several companies of cavalry, and sixteen cannons. The arrival at Groenlo was delayed because one of the cannons got stuck near the town of Vragender, today part of Lichtenvoorde. When the Spanish governor of Groenlo, Jan van Stirum, noticed the advance of Maurice, he ordered the return of his troops to Groenlo, which he had temporally stationed in Goor. On their way back to Groenlo, the Spanish troops were ambushed by Maurice's forces, who killed at least forty Spaniards. The next day, Maurice started the construction of a base camp to the west of Groenlo, and the construction of several trenches. William Louis, who assisted Maurice in the siege, stationed his troops to the east. The construction of the camps and trenches were completed within a week, after which Maurice sent a message to Stirum to capitulate, accompanied with three warning shots. Jan van Stirum sent a response letter, in which he refused to surrender and stated that he would defend Groenlo for 'God and King until his last drop of blood'. Stirum used two cannons to fire iron shreds at the besiegers and sent a message to his superiors for reinforcement.

=== Mondragon's arrival ===
To answer Stirum's request for help, the 81-year-old general and governor of Antwerp Cristóbal de Mondragón, nicknamed 'the good old Mondragon', was sent to Groenlo, accompanied by 7000 foot soldiers and 1300 cavalry. Although Mondragón was primarily ordered to keep Groenlo out of Dutch hands, he planned on a clash with Maurice to stop his campaign into Twente altogether. When Maurice heard of the approaching Mondragón on 21 July, he sped up the preparations of the battle field and completed the trenches the same day. In addition, Maurice ordered the dismantling of several bridges. Aware that the reinforcement troops led by Mondragón posed a major threat to the campaign, Maurice started to bombard Groenlo on 24 July and ordered its immediate surrender. After heavy deliberation with William Louis, Maurice discontinued the siege the next day, fearing that the approaching reinforcement troops would attack from the back and surround the Dutch forces.

== Aftermath ==
Because of a shortage of cars and coaches, Maurice burned the camp sites, together with hard-to-move equipment, and led his troops through Borculo and Ulft to Zelhem. The campaign into Twente was called off and Maurice used his troops instead to combat several bandit groups in the area. The artillery was sent to the city of Doesburg, which was in Dutch hands. Maurice suspended his Twente campaign until 1597, when he lay siege on Groenlo successfully.
