= Yamudiki Mogudu =

Yamudiki Mogudu (lit. 'Husband to Yama') may refer to:

- Yamudiki Mogudu (1988 film), a Telugu-language fantasy film
- Yamudiki Mogudu (2012 film), an Indian Telugu-language fantasy comedy film

== See also ==
- Yama (disambiguation)
- Mogudu (disambiguation)
