= Amini =

Amini may refer to:

== People ==
- Amini (surname), a surname (family name)
- Amini Fonua (born 1989), Tongan swimmer
- Amini Silatolu (born 1988), American football guard for the Carolina Panthers of the National Football League (NFL)

== Places ==
- Aminidivi, an island subgroup in the Union Territory of Lakshadweep, India
- Amini Island, a sub-division of the Union Territory of Lakshadweep, India
- Amini, India, a census town in Amini Island, Lakshadweep, India
- Amini Abad, a village in Galehzan Rural District, in the Central District of Khomeyn County, Markazi Province, Iran
- Amini Park, a cricket ground in Port Moresby, Papua New Guinea

== See also ==
- Yamini (disambiguation)
