= King of Hell =

King of Hell or The King of Hell may refer to:

- King of Hell (comics), a manhwa (Korean comics)
- Yama, sometimes known as the "King of Hell"
- The King of Hell, 2008 album by Helstar
- King of Hell, 2014 novel in The Shadow Saga series by Christopher Golden
- Simon Luttrell, 1st Earl of Carhampton, nicknamed "King of Hell"
- Crowley (Supernatural), a fictional character from Supernatural, who held the title "King of Hell"
- Asmodeus (Dungeons & Dragons), a fictional character from Dungeons & Dragons, whose title is "King of Hell"

== See also ==
- Yama (disambiguation)
- King ov Hell (born 1974), Norwegian musician
- King Hell Press
- The Devil, the Lord of Hell
- Hel (mythological being), ruler of Hel in Norse mythology
