= Yanwang =

Yanwang or Yan Wang may refer to:

- The kings of Yan (state) (燕王; Yānwáng)

- The kings of Former Yan (前燕王; Qiányànwáng)
- The kings of Later Yan (后燕王; Hòuyànwáng)
- The kings of Northern Yan (北燕王; Bĕiyànwáng)
- The kings of Southern Yan (南燕王; Nányànwáng)
- The kings of Western Yan (西燕王; Xīyànwáng)

- The feudal title Prince of Yan (燕王; Yānwáng) named after the above.
  - The Yongle Emperor of the Ming dynasty, who was previously known as the Prince of Yan before his enthronement
- Yanluo Wang (閻羅王, Yánluó Wáng), Chinese deity of the dead

== See also ==
- Wang Yan (disambiguation)
- Yama (disambiguation)
