= Mogudu =

Mogudu means husband in the Telugu-language. It may refer to:

- Athaku Yamudu Ammayiki Mogudu, a Telugu film produced by Allu Aravind
- Donga Mogudu, a 1987 Tollywood film
- Gharana Mogudu, a Telugu film
- Mogudu (film), a 2011 Telugu film directed by Krishna Vamsi
- Mogudu Kaavali, a Telugu film starring Chiranjeevi
- Mogudu Pellam O Dongodu, a Telugu film directed by Venky
- Yamudiki Mogudu (disambiguation)
