= Yammine =

Yammine (يمين) is an Arabic surname. Notable people with the surname include:

- Bassam Yammine (born 1968), Lebanese economist and banker
- George Yammine (1955–2000), Lebanese poet, media manager, and literature and arts critic

== See also ==
- Yamin (disambiguation)
