= Yemenite =

Yemenite (Arabic: يماني, romanized: Yamāni) is someone whose ancestors are from Yemen, or something that is linked to Yemen. It may refer to:

- Al-Yamani, a pre-messianic figure in Shia Islamic eschatology
- Yemenite Hebrew, dialect of the Hebrew language
- Yemenite Jews
- Yemenite Kaaba
- Yemenite step, an Israeli folk dance step originating from Yemen
- Yemenis, diaspora of Yemen

== See also ==
- Yemen (disambiguation)
