= Yamin =

Yamin may refer to:

- Yamin Yisrael, a political party in Israel
- Mount Yamin, a mountain in Indonesia
- Yemin Moshe, a neighborhood in Jerusalem

== People ==
Given name

- Yamin Abou-Zand (1986–2017), known by the nom de guerre Abu Umar al-Almani, a prominent German military commander of the Islamic State of Iraq and the Levant

Surname

- Aamer Yamin (born 1990), Pakistani cricketer
- Elliott Yamin (born 1978), Jewish American singer of Iraqi origin
  - Elliott Yamin (album)
- Mohammad Yamin, Indonesian poet, playwright and politician

== See also ==
- Yammine, a surname
- Yemin (disambiguation)
- Yemen (disambiguation) and Yaman (disambiguation)
- Yamini (disambiguation)
- Yamina
