= Joam Yama =

Joam Yama (c. 1566 – 29 September 1633) was a Japanese Jesuit born in Tsu Province, at the center of Japan’s main island. He served as the cleric of the Church of Yanagawa in Chikugo Province in Kyusyu. He was deported to Portuguese Macau in 1614, but six years later returned to Japan. He engaged in missionary work primarily in Oshu with Joam Mattheus Adami, a priest. However, he was captured in Aizu and sent to Edo (now Tokyo) in 1629, and was then martyred at the gallows and the pit (ana-tsurushi) in Edo on 29 September 1633.

== Biography ==
In August 1586, Yama joined the Society of Jesus and became the cleric of the Church of Yanagawa, which was ruled by the vassals of Don Francisco Otomo Sorin, a Christian feudal lord. There, Yama came to know Adami, who had come to Yanagawa as a priest in 1607. Since the Edo government had proclaimed anti-Christian Edicts in 1612, Yama and Adami were exiled to Macau with many other priests in November 1614. He was a monk and lost a leg in combat.

== Missionary work in Oshu ==
Yama returned to Japan in 1620 and was reunited with Adami, who had come back to Japan in 1618, to the seminary of Inawashiro near Wakamatsu, the capital of Aizu. They were engaged primarily in the missionary work in Oshu at that time. The Edo government had proclaimed anti-Christian Edicts again in 1619 and as a result, the oppression of Christians severely increased in Kyushu. Nevertheless, Aizu in Oshu, ruled by Leo Gamo Ujisato, a Christian feudal lord, was still at peace. Joam Bautista Porro, a priest, brought a statement of encouragement written by Pope Paul V to Aizu in 1620. However, Saemonsuke Oka, a chamberlain of the Gamou family, became the Lord of Inawashiro Castle in 1622, and asked Tadasato Gamou, a grandson of Ujisato, to commit apostasy. Persecution then began in Aizu. Porro stayed in Aizu and was reported to have been martyred in Yonezawa on 12 January 1629. This report was sent to Rome through André Palmeiro, a priest in Macau. But it was believed that it was actually Yama who went to Yonezawa and reported the martyrdom, instead of Porro.

== Martyrdom in Edo ==
In 1629, Yama was captured in Aizu and confined in the prison of Wakamatsu. More than one month later, he was sent from Wakamatsu to Edo for six days, escorted by strict guards in terrible winter weather. He was sentenced to the stake along with 15 Christians who were previously sent from Wakamatsu to Edo. However, seven officials of the government expressed interest in the declaration of Christianity written by Yama, which was as follows:

Recognize the Lord of heaven who has created all things in heaven and on earth. In respect to the truth that has no falsehood and which all of us need, there is nothing written in the Confucian writings and nothing taught by Shaka (Buddha) or the great philosopher of China, Confucius. This country is ignorant of this truth and is enveloped in eternal darkness as though the light of the sun cannot be seen. If you officials make the necessary effort to search for this truth in all of Japan, the new appearance of the sun would immediately be seen and would drive away the terrible darkness.

The execution of Yama was postponed and he instead spent four years in the prison of Edo, but the policy of the government to crack down on Christianity never altered. Meanwhile, Adami had left Aizu for Edo in 1630, and then went to Nagasaki, where he was martyred at the gallows and the pit in October 1633. Yama was martyred in the same manner in Edo, on 29 September 1633, at the age of 66.

== See also ==
- Catholic Church in Japan
