= Yamini (music festival) =

- Logo of the festival
- Genre: Indian classical music festival
- Dates: 25-26 January (annual)
- Location: Indian Institute of Management Bangalore
- Organizer: yamini-iimb.in

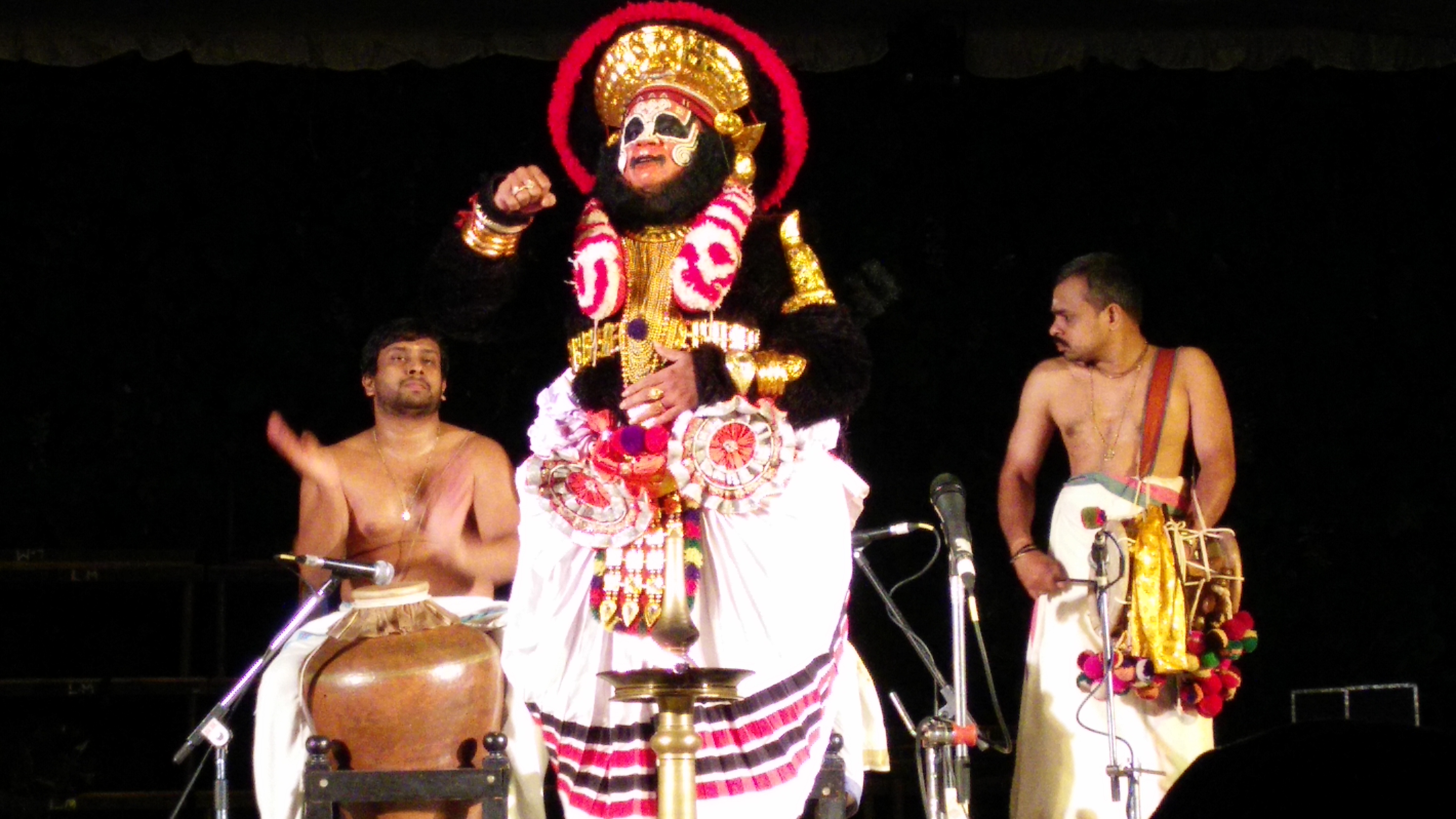
Koodiyattam performance by Margi Madhu

Yamini is an annual Indian classical music festival in Bangalore, organized by SPIC MACAY and hosted at Indian Institute of Management Bangalore (IIMB).

== Structure ==
The annual music event is being held for more than 7 years. The event is generally held in open air inside IIMB campus at the night before India's Republic Day and runs from dusk to dawn (6pm to 6 am). According to SPICMACAY, the primary organizers, the goal of the festival is to introduce and promote Indian classical music and arts amongst the young generation.

== Performers ==
In the last few years the organizers invited Indian classical musicians and performers. Some of them are—

Year	Performers	Field	References
2012	Ashwini Bhide Deshpande	Hindustani vocal	
2012	Kala Ramnath	Hindustani violin	
2012	Alarmel Valli	Bharatnatyam	
2012	Shashank Subramanyam	Carnatic flute	
2012	Madurai T.N. Seshagopalan	Carnatic vocal	
2013	Malavika Sarukkai	Bharatnatyam	
2013	Vishwa Mohan Bhatt	Mohan Veena	
2013	Lalgudi G.J.R. Krishnan & Lalgudi Vijayalakshmi	Carnatic violin	
2013	Wasifuddin Dagar	Hindustani vocal	
2013	Bombay Jayashri	Carnatic vocal	
2014	L. Subramaniam	Violin	
2014	Hyderabad brothers	Carnatic vocal	
2014	Kaushiki Chakraborty	Hindustani vocal	
2014	Tarun Bhattacharya	Santoor	
2014	Konark Natya Mandap	Gotipua dance	
2015	Dhananjayans	Bharatnatyam	
2015	Parveen Sultana	Hindustani vocal	
2015	Nityanand Haldipur	Hindustani flute	
2015	Ganesh and Kumaresh	Violin	
2015	Nithyasree Mahadevan	Carnatic vocal	
2016	Hariprasad Chaurasia	Hindustani flute	
2016	Jayanthi Kumaresh	Carnatic Veena	
2016	Margi Madhu	Koodiyattam	
2016	Saketharaman	Carnatic vocal	
2016	Gundecha Brothers	Dhrupad	
