= Yemen (disambiguation) =

Yemen, officially the Republic of Yemen (1990–present), is a country at the southern end of the Arabian Peninsula.

Yemen may also refer to:

== Historical political entities ==
=== South Arabian states ===
- North Yemen
  - Mutawakkilite Kingdom of Yemen (1918–1970)
  - Yemen Arab Republic (1962–1990)
- South Yemen
  - People's Republic of South Yemen (1967–1970)
  - People's Democratic Republic of Yemen (1970–1990)

=== Ottoman administrative divisions ===
- Yemen eyalet (1517–1672)
- Yemen vilayet (1872–1918)

== Geographic regions ==
- Yemen (region)
  - Upper Yemen
  - Lower Yemen
- Greater Yemen

== See also ==
- Yaman (disambiguation)
- Yemenite (disambiguation)
- Yamin (disambiguation)
- Yamen, bureaucrats in imperial China
