= Yamma =

Yamma may refer to:

== People ==
- Isaac Yamma (1940-1990), Australian musician
- Frank Yamma, Australian musician

== Other uses ==
- Yamma Mosque, mosque in Niger
- "Yamma, yamma", song performed in Finnish by Pave Maijanen for the Eurovision Song Contest 1992
- YAMMA Pit Fighting, mixed martial arts promotion in 2008
- Kingdom of Janjero, late 2nd millennium kingdom inside Ethiopia; also known as Yamma
- Lake Yamma Yamma, Queensland, Australia

== See also ==
- Yamnaya culture, or Yamna culture, an early Bronze Age culture
