= Yaman (name) =

- Gender: male

Origin
- Meaning: redoubtable, stalwart, intelligent, efficient, strong.
- Region of origin: Turkey

Yaman is a Turkish male given name and it means redoubtable, stalwart, intelligent, efficient, strong. It's also Arabic male given name (يَمان) which refers to someone who is from Yemen and it means blessing and plenty of goodness.

== Given name ==
- Yaman Candar, eponymous founder and first bey of the Candar dynasty in late 13th century Anatolia.
- Yaman Okay (1951-1993), Turkish actor.

== Surname ==
- Aylin Yaman (born 1967), Turkish physician and politician
- Çağla Yaman (born 1981), Turkish handball player
- Can Yaman (born 1989), Turkish actor
- Fuat Yaman (born 1958), Turkish football coach
- Gamze Nur Yaman (born 1999), Turkish women's footballer
- Hacı Arap Yaman (born 1965), Turkish carom billiards player
- İrem Yaman, Turkish female taekwondo practitioner
- Volkan Yaman (born 1982), German born Turkish professional football player
- Hudhayfah ibn al-Yaman (died 656) one of companion of the Islamic prophet
