= Wang Yang =

Wang Yang may refer to:

== People ==
- Wang Yang (politician) (born 1955), Chairman of the National Committee of the Chinese People's Political Consultative Conference
- Wang Yang (Liaoning politician) (born 1957), former provincial official from Liaoning
- Wang Yang (general) (汪洋; 1920–2001), Chinese general and government minister

=== Sportspeople ===
- Wang Yang (water polo) (born 1983), Chinese water polo player
- Wang Yang (footballer, born 1982), Chinese football player best known for his career at Jiangsu Sainty
- Wang Yang (footballer, born 1989), Chinese football player who currently plays for Hebei Zhongji
- Wang Yang (footballer, born 1991), Chinese football player
- Wang Yang (footballer, born 1993), Chinese football player who currently plays for Hangzhou Greentown
- Wang Yang (table tennis) (born 1994), Slovak table tennis player
- Jimmy Wang Yang (born 1981), American-born Korean wrestler
- Yang Wang (sport shooter) (born 1976), New Zealand sport shooter
- Wang Yang (sailor), Chinese sailor
- Wang Yang (wheelchair racer), Paralympic wheelchair racer
- Wang Yang (high jumper) (born 1989), Chinese athletics competitor

== Places ==
- Wang Yang district, Nakhon Phanom Province, Thailand
- Wang Yang, Phitsanulok, Thailand
- Wangyang, Huilong, a village in Huilong, Hanchuan, Xiaogan, Hubei, China
