= Joam Mattheus Adami =

Personal details
- Born: 17 May 1576 Mazara del Vallo
- Died: 22 September 1633 (aged 57) Nagasaki

Joam Mattheus Adami, (Italian: Giovanni Matteo Adami) (17 May 1576 – 22 September 1633) was a Jesuit missionary born in Mazara del Vallo (Sicilian: Mazzara), in the south-west of Sicily. Adami left for Macau in 1602, travelling via India, and reached Japan in 1604 after completing his studies. He served as the chief priest of the rectory of Yanagawa in Chikugo Province and was exiled to Macau in November 1614. However, he returned to Japan in July 1618. He pursued his missionary activities primarily in Oshu. He was captured and martyred at the gallows and the pit (ana-tsurushi) in Nagasaki on 22 September 1633.

== Biography ==
Adami joined the Society of Jesus in 1595 at the age of 19. He studied philosophy and theology at the Collegio de Romano in Rome, and was ordained as a priest. In 1602, he headed to Macau, through India, to study theology further. He completed his studies at the Collegio de Macau, before arriving in Japan in 1604.

== Missionary Work in Japan and Exile to Macau ==
In 1604, at the age of 28, Adami sailed from Macau to Japan on a junk and began learning Japanese on the island of Kyushu in Omura. He wrote an examination to gain a degree in theology in Japan on 23 September 1604, but was thrown out of Omura with other priests the same year. Adami took refuge in Bungotakada Church in Oita. In 1607, he became the chief priest of the rectory of Yanagawa in Chikugo Province, where he engaged in missionary work for seven years with Joam Yama, a monk. His Japanese language abilities improved. After the Edo government proclaimed the Anti-Christian Edicts in 1612, Adami was deported to Macau in November 1614. Yama was also exiled to Macau.

== Return to Japan ==
Adami returned to Amakusa in Kyushu, Japan, in July 1618, with several Japanese monks and remained in Oyano (now Kami-Amakusa) until 1619. However, persecution in Kyushu had become so severe that he went to Oshu in 1620, the northeastern part of Honshu (Japan’s main island), where he engaged in missionary work with Yama. Adami lived at the seminary of Inawashiro, near Wakamatsu, the capital of Aizu in Oshu. Inawashiro was ruled by Echigo (Sadatoshi) Oka, a zealous Christian hailing from Kyushu who had been a servant of Leo Ujisato Gamo, a Christian feudal load in Aizu. Pope Paul V sent a statement of encouragement to the Christians in Japan that reached Aizu the same year. Seventeen Christian leaders in Oshu, including Paul Chozaemon Shibayama, Joam Kiuemon Omori, Syusui Nakamaki, and Sandaiyu Sakamoto, sent a letter of thanks to the Pope in 1621.

== Infighting at Inawashiro Castle and Martyrdom in Nagasaki ==
In a letter dated 10 June 1623 regarding missionary work from April 1622 to April 1623 in Yonezawa, Wakamatsu, Mogami region, Adami reported that infighting and persecution began in Inawashiro after Echigo became ill. Saemonsuke Oka, a nephew of Echigo, was baptised but later committed apostasy. He assaulted the wives of vassals and asked Echigo to become an apostate. Saemonsuke also forced a son of Echigo to commit apostasy. He died at a young age. Four days after his son’s death, Echigo died in an accident. A son-in-law of Echigo died of illness four months later, and Saemonsuke became the lord of the castle in Inawashiro. Even in these circumstances, 732 people from the area were baptised between April 1622 and April 1623, and over 400 more people were baptised by June 1623. The martyrdom of Dewa (now Yamagata) in Oshu was reported by Adami in 1624. Even so, a further 360 people were baptised in Kaneyama, in Aizu. Tadasato Gamo, a grandson of Ujisato, abandoned his Christian faith on the advice of Saemonsuke and began to persecute Christians. Adami wandered and stayed with Shibayama and the other Christians in Aizu who were also later martyred. Cosmo Kazue Hayashi, a long-time vassal and the treasurer of Inawashiro Castle, was martyred by decapitation in Aizu by order of Saemonsuke in 1626. Adami headed to Nagasaki in 1630 through Edo (now Tokyo). Yama remained at the church of Aizu and was sent to Edo and martyred in 1632 at the age of 66. Adami was captured and martyred at the gallows and the pit in Nagasaki on 22 September 1633, one day after Julian Nakaura, a beatus, was martyred at the same place and in the same manner. Adami was 57 years old at the time of his martyrdom.

== Sources ==
- Schutter, Josef Franz S. J. (1975). Monumenta Historica Japoniae I: Textus Catalogorum Japoniae 1553-1654. Roma: Monumenta Historica Soc. Iesu.
- Mizobe, Osamu (2002). Life of Matteus Adami and Kirishitan in Aizu. (in Japanese) Sendai: The Catholic Institute Proceedings of Sendai Shirayuri Women’s College, Vol. 7, pp. 1–22.
- Kroehler, Armin H.; Kroehler, Evelyn M. (2006). Kirishitan in Aizu. Aizu: Sashimaya Printing Co.
- Matsuda, Kiichi; Kawasaki, Momota; Roger Machin (1987). Jesuit Letters from Japan in the XVIth and XVIIth Centuries in the Library of Kyoto University of the Foreign Studies. Kyoto: Duohoushya, ISBN 4-8104-0587-7.
