= Union of Delft =

1576 law in the Netherlands

The Union of Delft, (officially the "Act of Federation") was signed on 25 April 1576 by William the Silent, Prince of Orange, and the provinces of Holland and Zeeland in the Netherlands and made a definitive federation of the two provinces. It also made William the effective head of the federation, granted him supreme authority in war and allowed him to call a States General when he pleased with the aim of more effectively gathering resources and planning operations in the Eighty Years' War. Under the Union of Delft the levying of common funds was to be enforced with vigour.

The Union of Delft "pledged to resist de moetwillige regieringe der Spaenscher ende Uytheemscher Natie (the malevolent government of the Spanish and foreign nation). Through eighteen articles, including military, fiscal, and juridical provisions, Holland and Zeeland streamlined their mutual war effort in order to better resist the Habsburgs."

== See also ==
- Eighty Years' War
