= Yamini (given name) =

- Gender: Female
- Language: Sanskrit

Origin
- Meaning: starry night, light in the dark, artistic.
- Region of origin: India

Other names
- Related names: Rajani, Nisha

Yamini (Hindi : यामिनी) is a Hindu/Sanskrit Indian feminine given name, which means "starry night", "artistic", or "light in the dark".

== Notable people named Yamini ==
- Yamini Dalal, Indian biochemist
- Yamini Krishnamurthy (born 1940), Indian dancer
- Yamini Reddy (born 1982), Indian classical dancer, a Kuchipudi exponent
