= Yama, Burkina Faso =

Coordinates: 13°24′N 0°56′E

Yama
- Interactive map of Yama
- Country: Burkina Faso
- Region: Plateau-Central Region
- Province: Ganzourgou
- Department: Méguet Department

Population (2019)
  - Total: 538

Yama is a village in the Méguet Department of Ganzourgou Province in central Burkina Faso.

Population
| Year | Pop. | ±% |
|---|---|---|
| 2006 | 349 | — |
| 2019 | 538 | +54.2% |
