= Cristóbal de Mondragón =

16th-century Spanish general

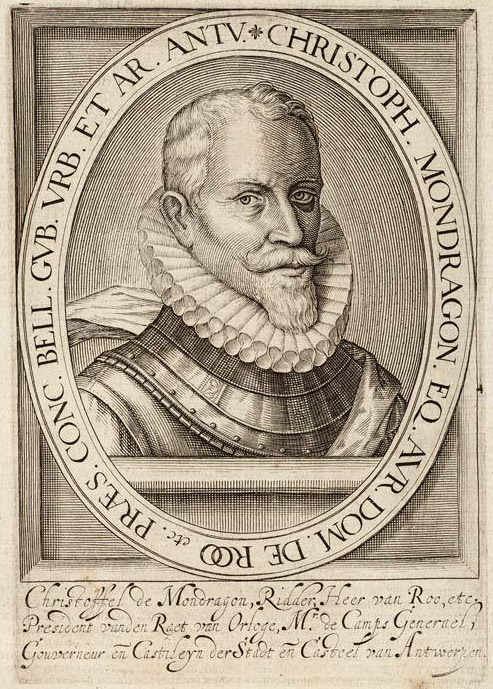
- Born: 1504/1514; Medina del Campo, Spain
- Died: 1596; Antwerp, Spanish Netherlands
- Military career
- Allegiance: Spanish Empire
- Branch: Army
- Rank: General
- Conflicts: Schmalkaldic War; Battle of Mühlberg; Eighty Years War; Relief of Goes; Siege of Middelburg; Siege of Zierikzee; Battle of Gembloux; Siege of Maastricht; Siege of Antwerp; Siege of Coevorden; Siege of Groenlo; Battle of the Lippe

Cristóbal de Mondragón y Otálora de Mercado (1514–1596) was a Spanish general during the Eighty Years' War.

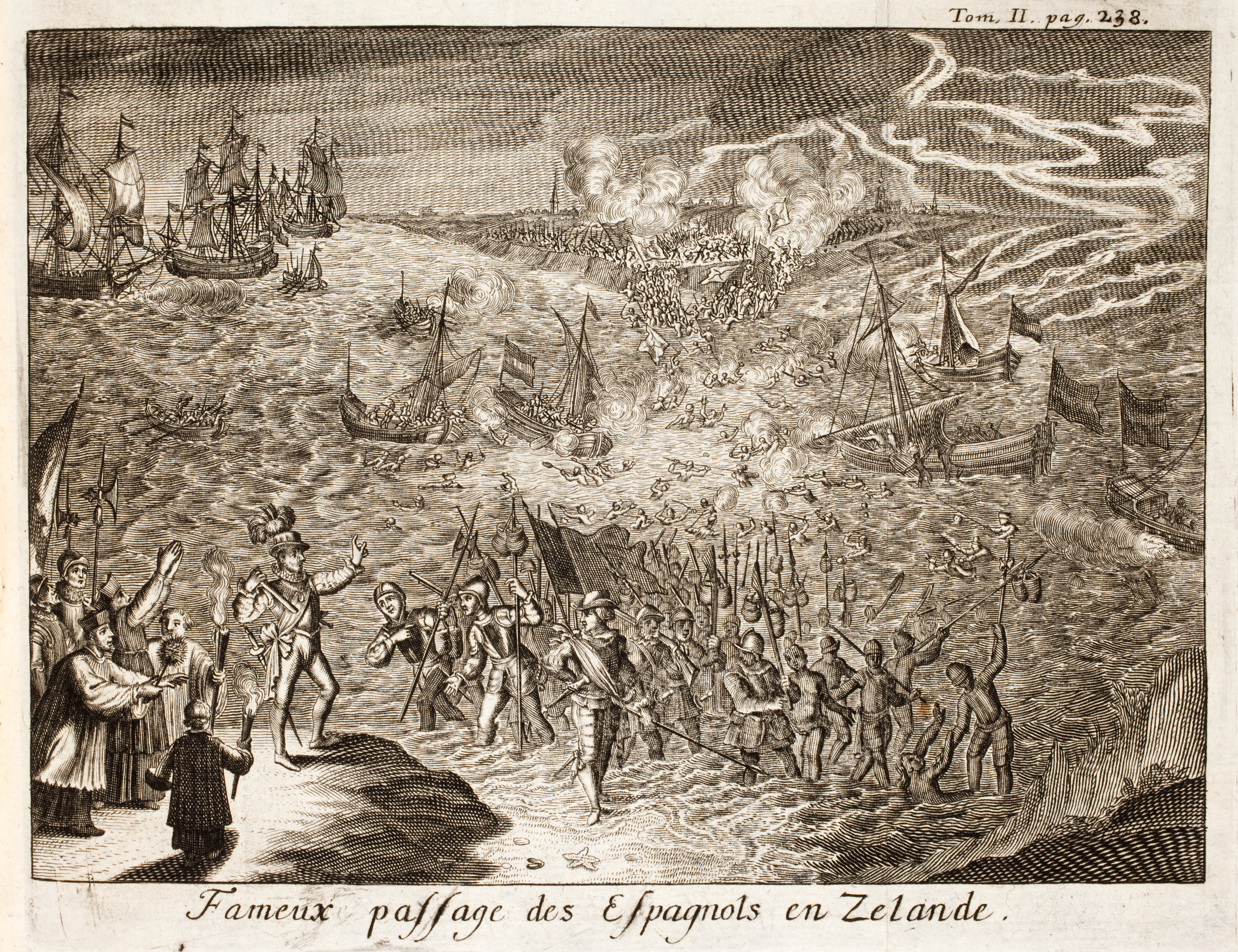
Spanish troops led by Mondragón cross the Zijpe near Zierikzee between Schouwen and Duiveland in the night of 28/29 September 1575.

He was a prominent military figure of the sixteenth century, and was colonel of one of the Tercios of Flanders under the Duke of Alva, Luis de Requesens, Alexander Farnese and Count Mansfeld. He fought during the Eighty Years' War against the armies of William of Orange first and after Maurice of Nassau.

His talents in strategy and spywork led to important victories by the Spanish troops in Flanders and the Netherlands in a time of decline of Spanish domination in this region. Mondragón also greatly developed amphibious warfare with techniques like wading through tidal rivers.

== Life ==
He arrived in Flanders in 1544 and (barring two short trips in 1570/71 and 1579) remained there the rest of his life, speaking the local language and marrying a Flemish woman.

=== Early years ===
Although born in Medina del Campo like his father, Mondragon came from the town of Mondragón in Gipuzkoa. His mother belonged to one of the most important noble and powerful families in Medina del Campo.

=== Beginning of his military career ===
He enlisted in the army in 1532 during the reign of Charles V, and served as a soldier first in Italy and later in Tunisia, Provence, Germany and Flanders.

Cristóbal de Mondragón was released first in the Battle of Mühlberg against the Protestants of the Schmalkaldic League in the heroic step of the ford of the Elbe, which the playwright Lope de Vega recalled in his verses. The troops of the League were camped on the banks of the Elbe, near the present town now belongs to the German state of Brandenburg and Saxony at that time. The Saxons had destroyed the bridges over the Elbe, which implied a natural barrier impassable. Mondragon was part of the brave men who, on the night of April 24, 1547, led the fording of the river "with the sword in the mouth and chest above water", making the enemy take several pontoons in the middle of musket fire. Thanks to the pontoons stolen could build a bridge over the river that allowed the passage of large imperial army who came led by Charles V himself and the Duke of Alba taking by surprise the enemy troops.

In April 1559, with the Peace of Cateau-Cambrésis he was appointed governor of Damvillers, in the Duchy of Luxembourg and Walloon colonel of the Tercios. As a colonel he served under Sancho d'Avila when they saw the first revolts in Flanders Protestants led by Prince William of Orange. By 1569 he defended the cities of Liège and Deventer against the Dutch insurgents. In 1571 he was appointed governor of Utrecht.

In 1572 he raised the siege of Goes, and in reward was appointed Stadhouder of Zeeland by the Duke of Alba. On 18 February 1574, after a long siege he handed Middelburg over to the forces of William the Silent, his Spanish garrison withdrawing with arms and honours intact. Two years later he successfully besieged Zierikzee but afterwards was unable to stop his troops (who had not been paid for a long time) from mutinying. Under Alessandro Farnese he took part in the 1578 Battle of Gembloux and 1579 siege of Maastricht.

In 1587 he was appointed governor of the citadel of Antwerp, but this did not keep him from taking the field. Five years later, with little reinforcements, he was unsuccessful at defending Coevorden from Maurice of Nassau, who then retained it from the royalist army. His last campaign was in 1595, when he was 81 years old. He raised Maurice of Nassau's siege of Groenlo and attempted a direct confrontation with him, but Maurice drew back, leaving Mondragon to drive off Philip of Nassau's cavalry and capture Philip, who died of wounds the following day. Mondragón ended his days in Antwerp, where he died of old age on 4 January 1596.
