= Yami Qaghan (disambiguation) =

Yami Qaghan, Jama Qaghan, Jamï Qaghan, Yama Qaghan or Yiamy Qaghan may refer to:

- Bumin Qaghan, founder of the First Turkic Khaganate
- Yami Qaghan, first qaghan of the independent Eastern Turkic Khaganate
