= Siege of Zierikzee =

1575–1576 siege in the Eighty Years' War

- Part of the Eighty Years' War
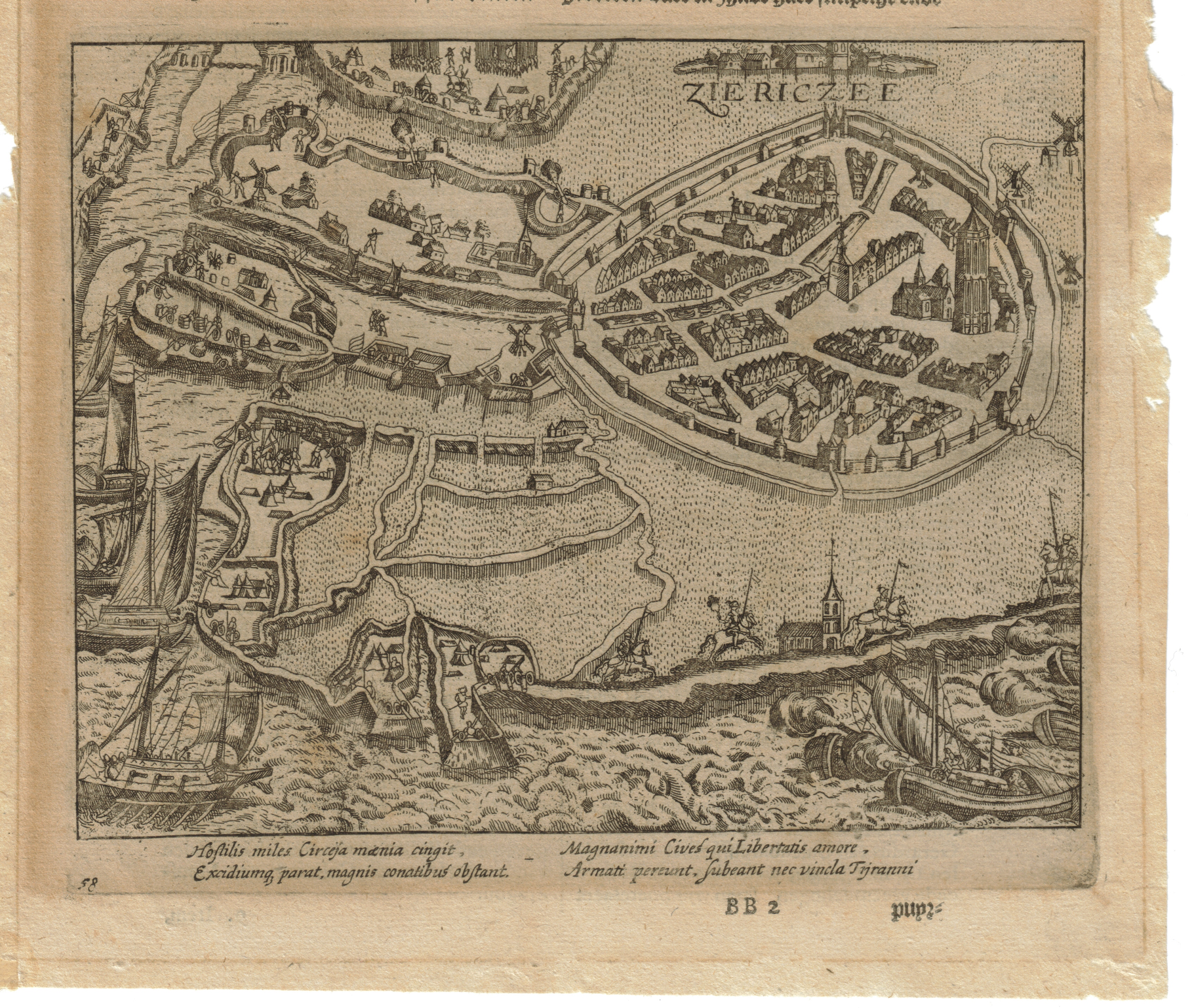
- The siege of Zierikzee
Date	October 1575 – 29 July 1576
Location	Zierikzee (present-day Zeeland) 51°38′59″N 3°54′59″E
Result	Spanish victory

Belligerents
Dutch rebels	Spain

Commanders and leaders
Arend van der Dorp	(Spanish Empire) Cristóbal de Mondragón

Strength
1,200	3,000 infantry, 400 cavalry
- Location within Netherlands Siege of Zierikzee (North Sea)

The siege of Zierikzee was a siege in the Eighty Years' War between October 1575 and July 1576.

== History ==
When Modragón lay siege to the city, Zierikzee had had enough time to prepare their defenses because the preceding siege of Bommenede had taken Modragón 20 days, which was a long time for a relative small city.
The Spanish couldn't storm Zierikzee, and therefore tried to cut off all supplies to the city. Until February 1576, despite heavy fire, small Dutch vessels were able to reach and supply the city. the defenders also did several sorties which inflicted casualties and damage on the Spanish. But by March, the Spanish had sealed all access to the city.

The Dutch under Admiral Lodewijk van Boisot and William the Silent made 3 attempts to break the siege. On 11 April a major sea battle was fought, but ended indecisively. A second attack on 27 May failed because the Spanish had been warned. Furthermore, Admiral Boisot was killed. After a third failed attempt, the Dutch withdrew on 13 June.

Hunger now forced the defenders to start negotiations, which were concluded on 29 July. The garrison was allowed to leave the city, but Zierikzee had to pay 100,000 gulden. The city was occupied by the Spanish. But on 12 July a mutiny broke out among the Spanish troops, who didn't receive their long overdue and promised pay. They extorted money and goods from the population and abandoned Zierikzee on 3 November. They headed to Brabant, and Modragón had no option but to follow his troops.

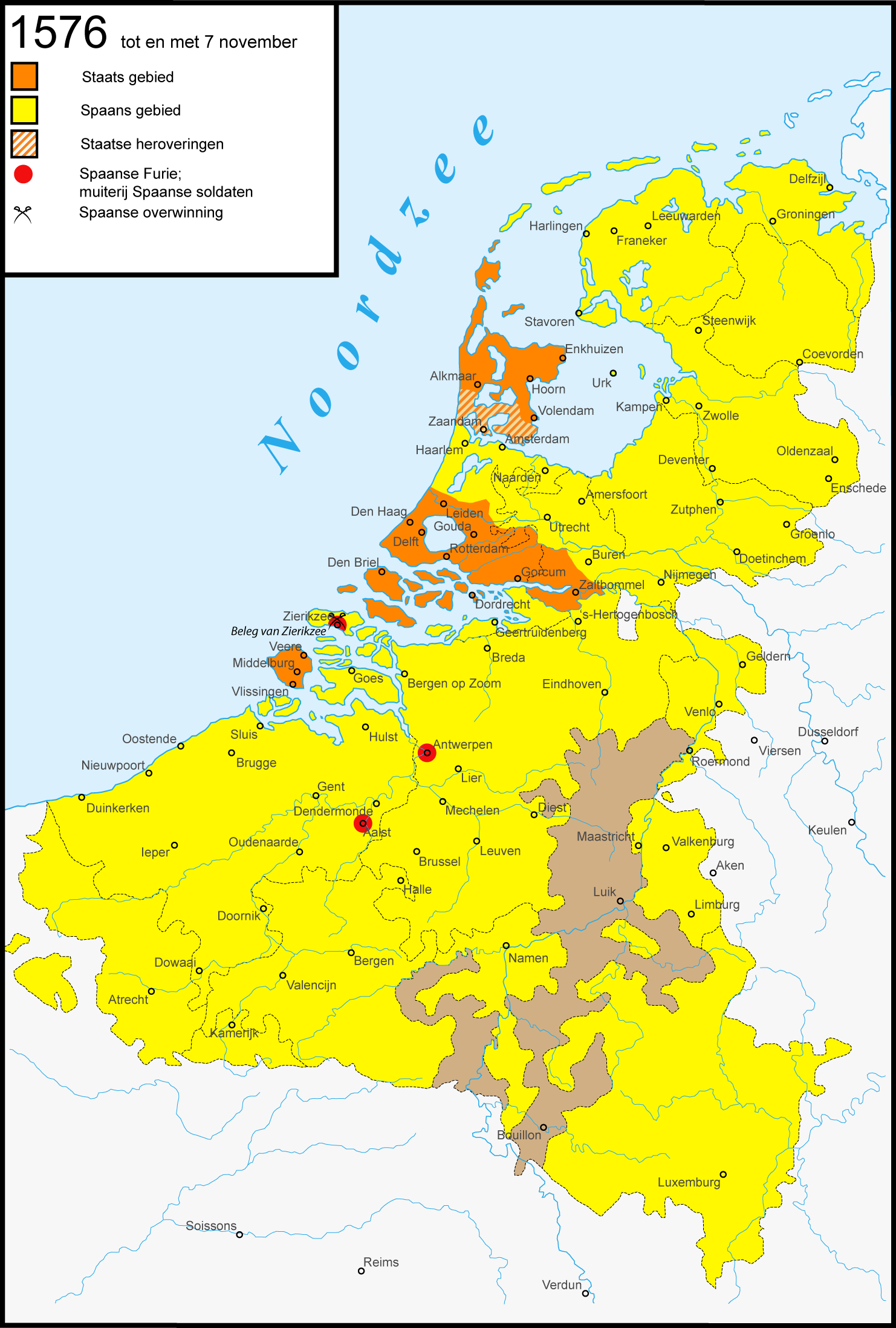
The Low Countries in 1576 just after the taking of Zierikzee

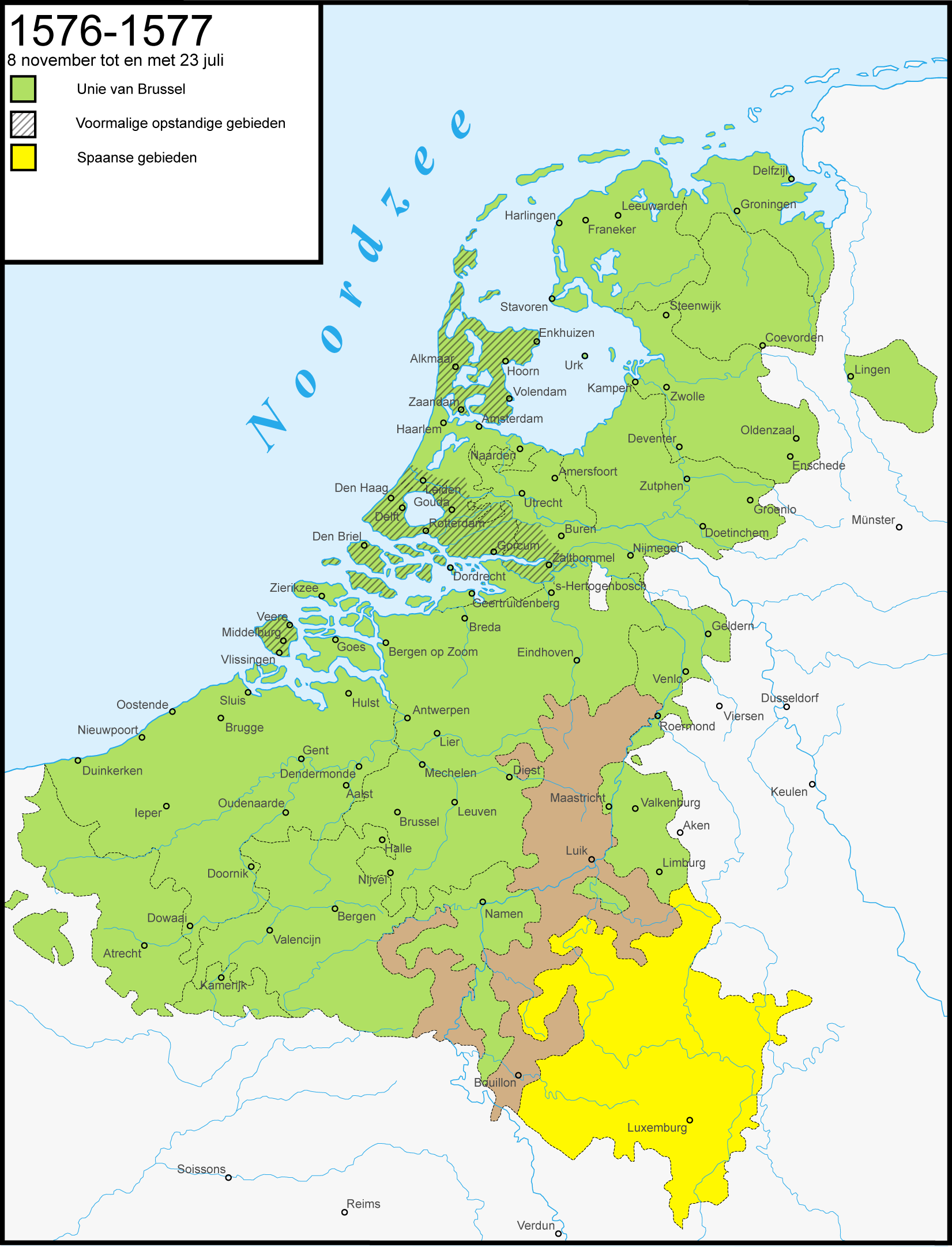
The Low Countries one year later after the mutinies

== Sources ==
- VAN OPSTAND TOT OORLOG (in Dutch) (p107-p 110)
