= Luis de Requesens y Zúñiga =

Spanish general, sailor, diplomat and politician (1528–1576)

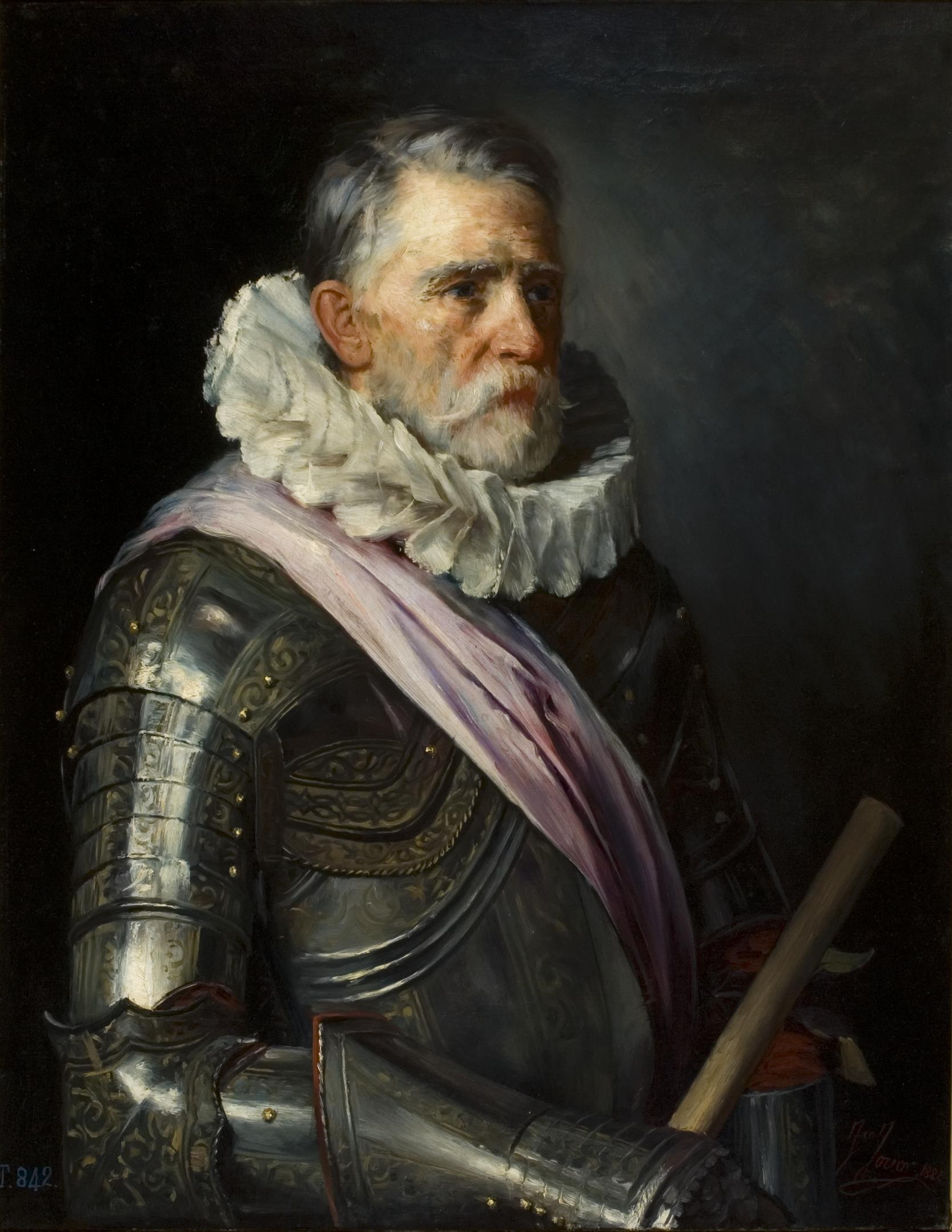
Portrait of Luis de Requesens, by Francisco Jover y Casanova (Prado museum)

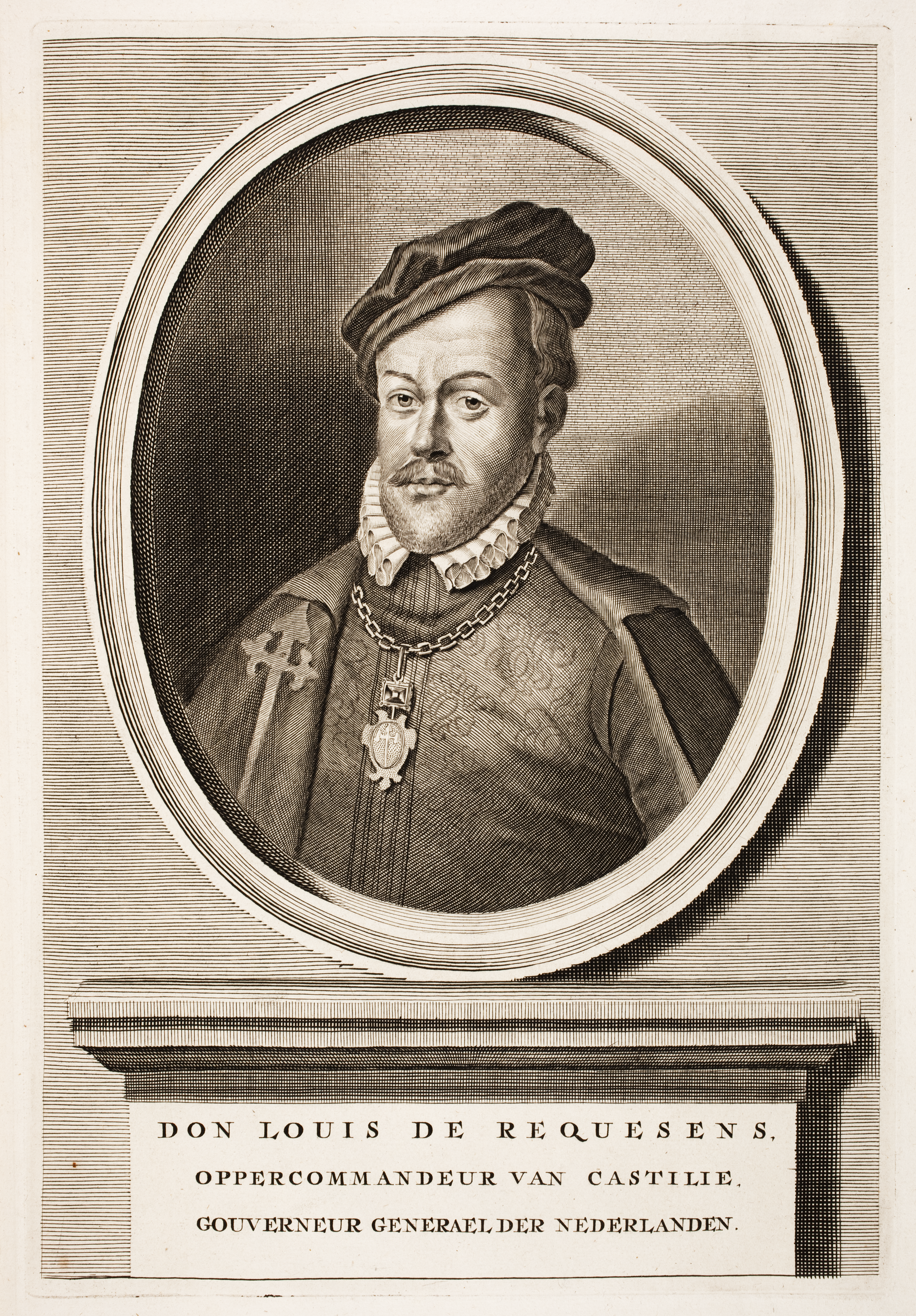
Luis de Requesens y Zúñiga

Luis de Requesens y Zúñiga (25 August 1528 – 5 March 1576) was a Spanish general, sailor, diplomat and politician. He served as governor of the Duchy of Milan (1572–1573) and as governor of the Spanish Netherlands (1573–1576).

== Biography ==
Luis de Requesens y Zúñiga was born at Molins de Rei, Spanish Empire. He and his brother Juan de Zúñiga y Requesens (Viceroy of Naples in 1579–1582), were the sons of Juan de Zúñiga, a tutor of King Philip II, and Estefanía de Requesens. He married Gerónima Estelrich y Gralla, the daughter of Francisco Gralla, "Maestre Racional" or Finances Head Controller in Catalonia.

His early career was that of a government official and diplomat. In 1563 he gained the king's confidence as his representative at Rome. In 1568 he was appointed lieutenant-general to John of Austria during the suppression of the Morisco Revolt in the Alpujarras, and he also accompanied John during the Lepanto campaign, his function being to watch and control his nominal commander-in-chief, whose excitable temperament was distrusted by the king.

In 1572 Philip named him Governor of the Duchy of Milan, a post usually given to a great noble. Requesens was only a gentleman, though by the king's favour he was grand commander of the military order of Santiago in Castile. He was credited with having shown moderation at Milan, but he came into sharp collision with the archbishop, Charles Borromeo, who took up the cause of his flock.

In 1573 he was called by Philip II to succeed Fernando Álvarez de Toledo, 3rd Duke of Alba as governor of the Spanish Netherlands, then in revolt against the Spaniards.

He was rather moderate in comparison to Alba, requesting Philip to grant a general amnesty to all, with the exception of persistent heretics, and to permit the emigration of those who would not comply.

The king wished to pursue a more conciliatory policy, without, however, yielding any one of the points in dispute between himself and the revolting Dutch. His situation was aggravated by the empty Spanish treasury. Requesens came to Brussels on 17 November 1573 and launched a new military campaign. In February 1574 the rebels had conquered the port of Middelburg, but Requesens's army obtained a victory against the troops of Louis of Nassau at the Battle of Mookerheyde, during which William the Silent's two brothers died.

However, at this point the money for funding his troops was exhausted; Requesens had to find an agreement with William the Silent, the leader of the Flemish opposition, with the mediation of the Emperor Maximilian II. The negotiations were held in Breda. Requesens declared himself ready to remove his troops from Flanders, but in exchange Catholicism was to be the only religion accepted. However, by now Protestantism had gained deep roots in the Netherlands, and therefore the proposal was rebuffed by the Dutch. Requesens restarted the military campaign and his troops occupied much of Zeeland, but when Philip II stopped payment to the Flemish troops, they mutinied and military operations were halted for one year.

Requesens died suddenly at Brussels in 1576, to be replaced in the now totally chaotic Netherlands by John of Austria, half-brother of King Philip II of Spain. His body was brought to Barcelona and buried in his family palace.

== See also ==
- Eighty Years' War

Government offices
Preceded by Álvaro de Sande	Governor of the Duchy of Milan; 1572–1573	Succeeded by Antonio de Zúñiga y Sotomayor, 3rd Marquis of Ayamonte
Preceded by Fernando Álvarez de Toledo, 3rd Duke of Alba	Governor of the Habsburg Netherlands; 1573–1576	Succeeded by John of Austria
