= Julián Romero and Saint Julian =

Painting by El Greco

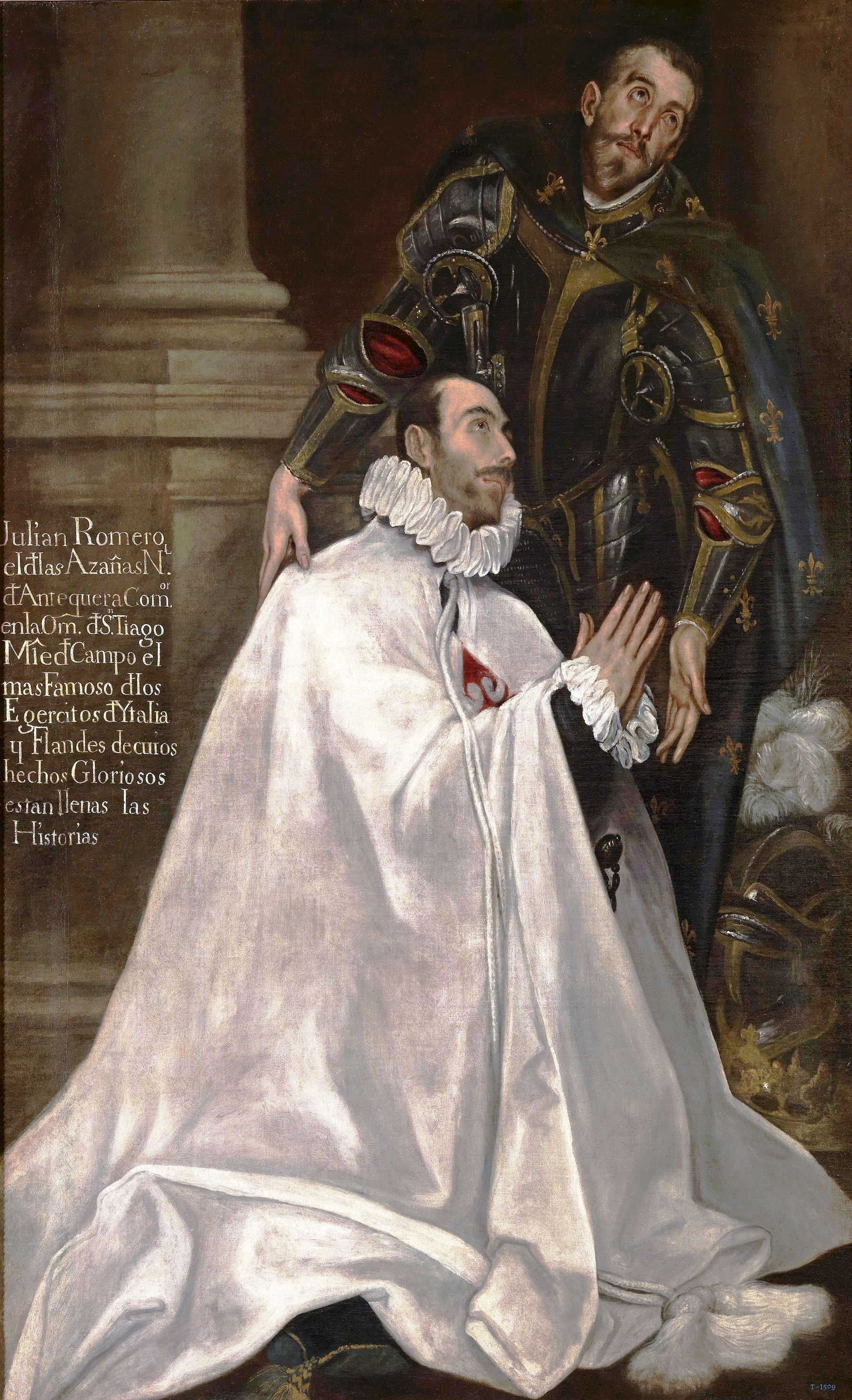
- Artist: El Greco
- Year: 1612-1614
- Medium: oil on canvas
- Dimensions: 206.7 cm × 127.5 cm (81.4 in × 50.2 in)
- Location: Museo del Prado, Madrid

Julián Romero and Saint Julian is a 1612-1614 painting by El Greco, now in the Museo del Prado in Madrid.

It depicts the Spanish military hero Julián Romero, as identified by an inscription at the base of the column, kneeling in prayer accompanied and presented by his armoured name-saint and patron Julian the Hospitaller (sometimes confused with Saint Louis of France due to the fleur-de-lys on his cloak). Romero was a senior military leader as Maestre de Campo in the army of Philip II of Spain and a Knight of the Order of Santiago. He had died in 1577.

The inscription had been added later and describes Romero as Julian Romero of the Exploits, born Antequera, Commander of the Order of San Tiago and Maistre de Campo in the Army in Italy and Flanders, whose deeds were legendary. In fact he was born at Huélamo.

== See also ==
- List of works by El Greco

== Bibliography ==
- ÁLVAREZ LOPERA, José, El Greco, Madrid, Arlanza, 2005, Biblioteca «Descubrir el Arte», (colección «Grandes maestros»). ISBN 84-95503-44-1.
- SCHOLZ-HÄNSEL, Michael, El Greco, Colonia, Taschen, 2003. ISBN 978-3-8228-3173-1.
