= Juan del Águila =

Spanish general (c. 1545–1602)

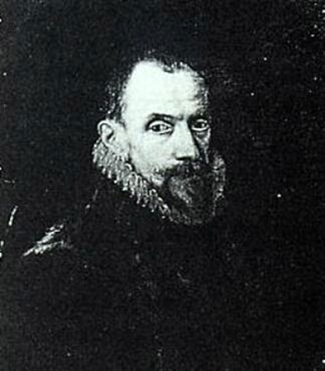
- 1587 portrait by Otto van Veen
- Born: Juan del Águila y Arellano c. 1545; Ávila
- Died: August 1602 (aged 56–57); A Coruña
- Occupation: Spanish general

Juan del Águila y Arellano (Ávila, c. 1545 – A Coruña, August 1602) was a Spanish general. He commanded the Spanish expeditionary Tercio troops in Sicily then in Brittany (1584–1598, also sending a detachment to raid England), before serving as general of the Spanish armies in the invasion of Ireland (1600–1602). As a soldier, and subsequently Maestre de campo of the Tercios, he was posted to Sicily, Africa, Malta, Corsica, Milan, the Netherlands, Spain, Portugal, France and Ireland, where he participated in major military events of his time, such as the Siege of Malta, the Looting of Antwerp, the Siege of Antwerp, the "Miracle of Empel", an expedition in support of the French Catholics during the French Wars of Religion, the Raid on Mount's Bay and another one in support of Irish clans during the Nine Years War. He was however defeated at Kinsale after the fourth Spanish armada was sent to Ireland which resulted in bitter recriminations.

== Childhood ==
Juan del Águila was born in Barracco in the province of Ávila in 1545 within a family of provincial nobility. He was the fourth son of Miguel del Águila y Velasco and Sancha de Arellano, and grandson of Lord Villaviciosa. His childhood was spent in Berraco (now El Barraco).

== From soldier to captain ==
=== Service in Italy ===
In 1563, at eighteen years old, Juan del Águila followed the Gonzalo de Bracamonte's company which joined the Sicilian Tercio. He served there for 24 years. The following year he took part in the conquest of Peñón de Vélez de la Gomera, then a pirate haven.

In 1565 he was part of the contingent sent to the relieve the Ottoman siege of Malta. A year later he was sent to Corsica in support of the Genoese who were trying to quell the Sampiero Corso's rebellion.

=== Service in Flanders ===
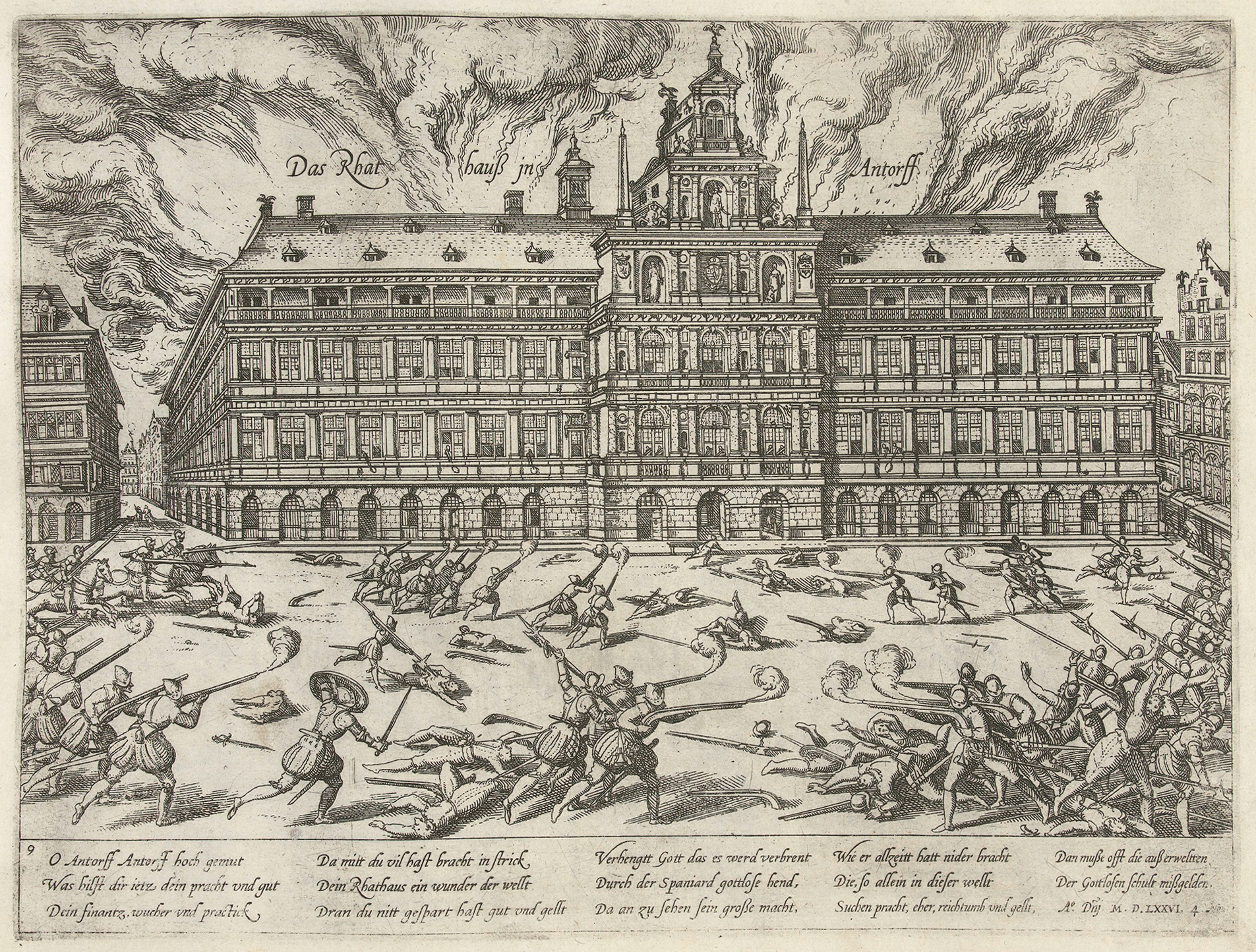
Burning of the Town Hall during the looting of Antwerp

In 1567 the Sicilian Tercio departed for Flanders.

In 1568 started the Eighty Years' War also called the Flanders' revolt against the Spanish Monarchy, which it would end in 1648 with the Treaty of Westphalia

In 1569 Captain Pedro Gonzalez de Mendoza promoted Águila to lieutenant.

In 1574 Juan del Águila took part in the battle of Mook.

In 1576 He was sent to relieve Ghent castle. That same year, the Tercio mutinied for lack of pay and fortified themselves in Alost. Taking advantage of the situation and the power vacuum after the death of governor general Luis de Requesens, William of Orange held a general revolt, declaring all Spanish and those who collaborated with them, "rebels". So, German and Walloon troops of Antwerp switched sides, allowing Dutch troops to enter the city, who besieged the citadel, commanded by Sancho d'Avila. In this situation, Juan del Aguila convinced the mutineers from Alost to march to Antwerp to help his countrymen, then taking the city, but causing the infamous Sack of Antwerp

That same year (1577) Juan del Águila was named captain.

=== Between Flanders and Italy ===
In May 1577 Juan del Águila's Tercio left Maastricht destined for Lombardy after signing the Perpetual Edict. But in August of that same year, Governor Juan de Austria once again claimed his presence to pacify Flanders. The death of his Maestre de campo, Julian Romero, delayed his departure until the fall. Finally in December the Tercio reached the Netherlands. For three years they waged war without receiving a single salary. In February 1580, the governor Alexander Farnese (Juan de Austria had died in 1578) was forced to repatriate the Tercios because of the negotiations for submission by the Walloons.

In 1582 the Tercio was again called to Flanders, which arrived in late July after a journey of forty days by the Spanish Road.

After the conquest of the Tornhout castle in April 1583, Farnese appointed Juan del Águila as its governor, but not for long. Three months later, on 23 July, the major city Nieuwpoort surrendered to the Spanish and Del Águila became the new governor, and his company became the garrison.

== Maestre de campo ==
=== Service in Flanders ===
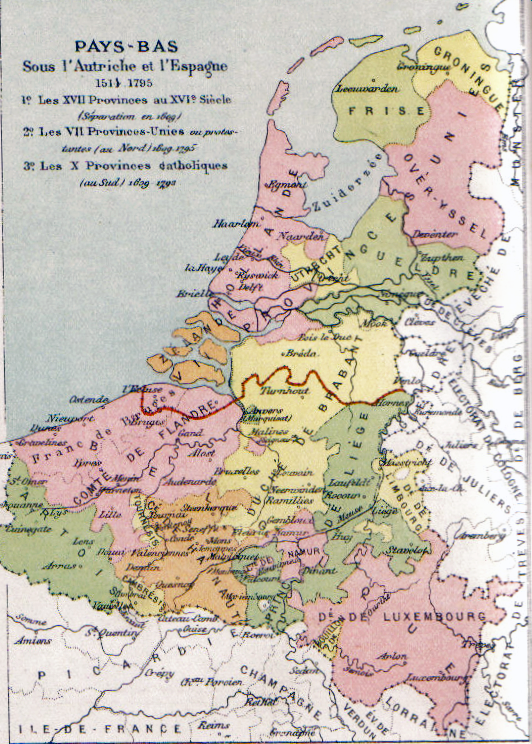
The Netherlands at the time of Juan del Águila.

On 16 August 1583 the Maestre de campo of the Tercio in which Juan de Águila served, died in Dendermonde. Ten days later, Farnese named him Maestre de campo, at only 38 years old.

At the end of 1584 Siege of Antwerp began, in which Juan de Águila and his Tercio particularly distinguished themselves by defeating the Dutch who tried to rescue the city from the Covenstein dyke (27 May 1585). After the capture of the city in the summer of that year, the Tercios received their back pay: 37 overdue salaries from July 1582.

After taking Antwerp, Farnese graduated a part of the army and sent the rest to the north to help reimpose Catholicism and Spanish rule in the northern Netherlands. The army commanded by Ernesto de Mansfeld consisted of three Tercios, including that of Juan del Águila. On reaching the river Meuse, in late November, Mansfeld divided the army, some camped on the shore and another on the island of Bommel, formed by the rivers Meuse and Waal. In this second group were the masters Juan del Águila and Francisco Arias de Bobadilla.

The Dutch rebels then broke the levees protecting the area, the water level rose and flooded the island. The Spanish were thus isolated and unprotected in the Empel dam. On 2 December, a Dutch fleet entered the flooded land with the intention of annihilating the tercios. With the artillery that they had managed to salvage, the troops of Juan del Águila occupied an islet that had formed after the flood and staved off the rebel boats to prevent them from approaching. Meanwhile, the Dutch seized other islets and began construction of fortifications, which ended in record time despite the Spanish cannon shots.

Mansfeld got a few barges from the inhabitants of Den Bosch to attack the enemy fleet, but they were destroyed in a surprise attack. The situation was desperate.

On the night of 7 December a soldier found, buried near the church of Empel, a table with the image of the Immaculada and, as 8 December was its feastday, the discovery was considered a good omen:

This very rich treasure that they discovered under the earth was a divine proclamation of good fortunes, and through the intercession of the Virgin Mary, they were waiting the blessed day

That same night, Bobadilla ordered an assault on the forts with the few boats available. Meanwhile, the temperature dropped sharply and a strong wind began to blow. The water then began to freeze. As a result of this the Dutch ships were withdrawn for fear of being blocked and the Spanish were able to take the forts.

This unthinkable situation was thereafter referred to as the Miracle of Empel (in Dutch: Het Wonder van Empel). The rebels exclaimed "God has become a Spaniard" and from then on the infantry began to devote itself to the Immaculada which led to her become its patron saint.

On 24 January 1586, Don Juan D'Aguila and his troops, including 17 foot soldiers and 4 Cornet cavalry horsemen, raided the German villages of Boslar, Muntz and Gevenich. They gravely wounded many citizens, and stole their possessions or destroyed them.

Later in 1586, Juan del Águila's Tercio participated in the conquests of Grave (6 June), Neuss (26 July), Alpen (13 August) and the rescue of Zutphen (22 September), forcing the English army that had besieged it to lift the siege.

On 12 June 1587 the siege of the Esclusa began at the mouth of the Scheldt river. In July Juan del Águila was seriously wounded. Before completing his recovery he was called to the Court, where he arrived in the spring of 1588. There, he was presented to Philip II with these words: "Your Majesty, meet a man born without fear."

The king assigned him a newly created tercio which was waiting in Santander. The troops were part of the second landing army from the campaign against England. In September, the operation was canceled when the Great Armada disaster occurred.

=== Service in Spain ===
After nearly a year of waiting, the Tercio embarked for A Coruña where they arrived on 17 August 1589. Ten days later they embarked again, this time with orders to escort the Indian fleet in the final stretch of its journey to Lisbon. They were joined by six companies and another Tercio, and together they returned to take to sea to go back to Galicia, where they would spend the winter.

Meanwhile, in France, after the assassination of the Duke of Guise (23 December 1588), pretender to the French throne and king Henry III himself (1 August 1589), the crown passed to Henry III of Navarre, a Protestant, something that the Catholic League and Philip II could not tolerate.

Thus, in August 1590, in Ferrol Juan del Águila's Tercio embarked and headed for France to support the Catholics.

=== Service in France ===
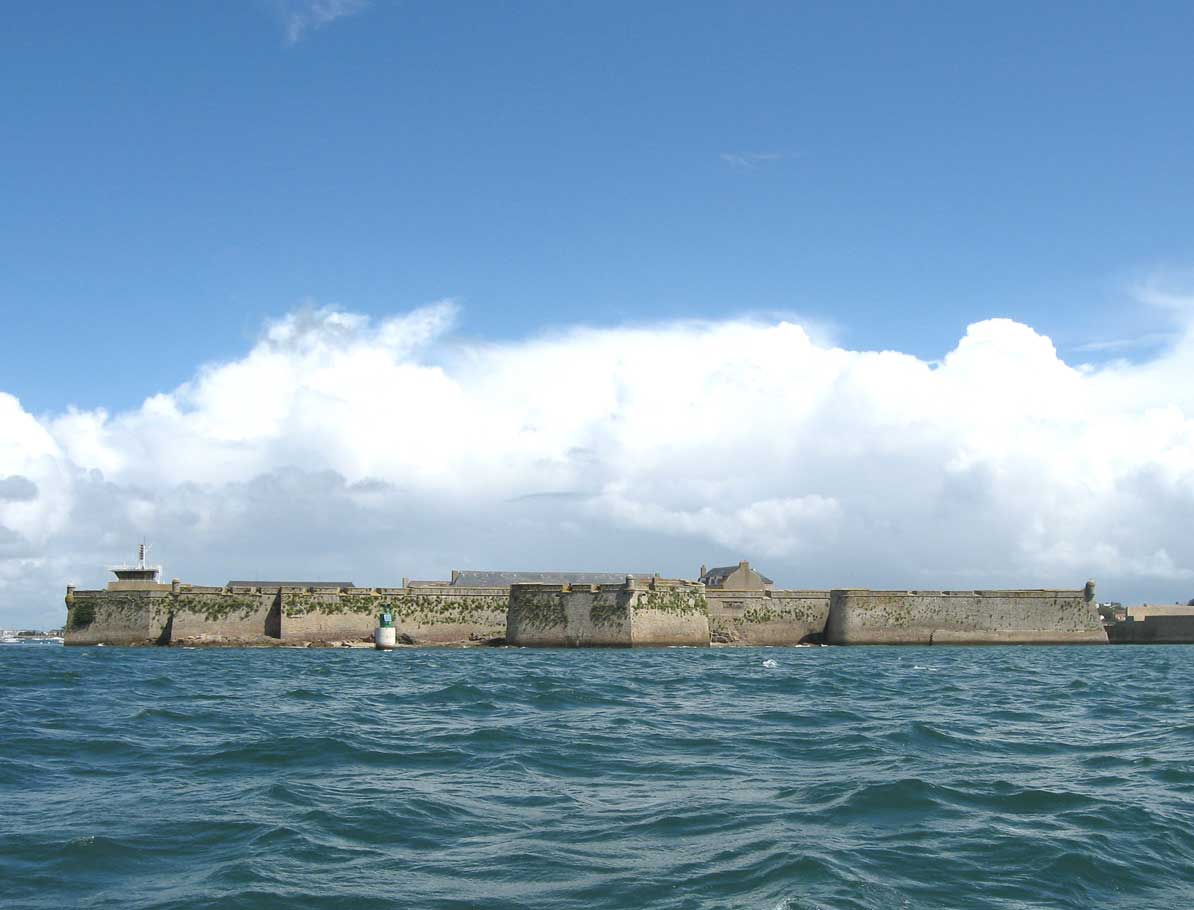
El Fuerte Del Águila (Del Águila Fort) in its current state, heavily modified by Vauban.

On 25 October 1590 he landed in Nantes (Brittany), with his army. He established as an operational base the port of Blavet (now Port-Louis). At the end of the year he began the fortification of the city undertaken by Cristóbal de Rojas, who built the magnificent "Fuerte Del Águila" (Del Águila Fort), named after the maestre de campo.

On 21 November 1591 he took the castle of Blain. On 21 May 1592 he defeated an Anglo-French army in Craon and, after chasing the English contingent, he completely destroyed it in Ambrières. On 6 November of that year he took Brest.

In 1593 part of the Juan del Águila army landed on Camaret and built "La Pointe des Espagnols" (The Tip of the Spaniards) fort in the Crozon peninsula, dominating the entrance to the Brest port. In September 1594 he failed to relieve the town of Morlaix under siege which led to bitter tensions between himself and the Duke of Mercour. On 1 October, an Anglo-French army started a siege of Fort Crozon, while an English fleet bombarded the place from the sea. The garrison could only hold out until 15 November, while the auxiliary army, led by Juan del Águila, failed to relieve the fort having been blocked at Plomodiern. On the 19th an assault by the besiegers put the garrison to the sword - there were only thirteen survivors.

==== Expedition to England ====
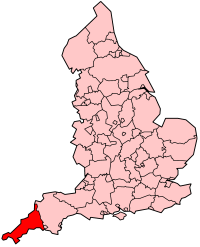
Spanish operations took place on the coast of Cornwall County.

Taking advantage of the "break" that he got from the French troops, Juan del Águila decided to organize a punitive expedition against England, for helping Henry IV of France.

Thus, on 26 July 1595, three companies of musketeers from his Tercio under the command of Captain Carlos de Amézquita sailed in four galleys. They first made landfall in Penmarch to get supplies. On 31 July they left for England and landed on 2 August in Mounts Bay, Cornwall. In two days the expedition sacked and burned Mousehole (where only a pub survived), Newlyn, Paul and Penzance. They then re-embarked on the galleys.

On 5 August, a day after setting sail back to France, they found a Dutch squadron of 46 ships from which they managed to escape but not before sinking two enemy ships. On 10 August, Amézquita and his men landed victoriously in Blavet. The expedition resulted in 20 casualties, all of them in the skirmish against the Dutch.

On 2 May 1598 the Peace of Vervins was signed, through which Spain returned all conquered places (including Blavet) in exchange for France vacating Charolais and places taken in Flanders.

Therefore, Juan del Águila and the tercio had to return to Spain.

=== Service in Spain ===
The tercio was sent to Cádiz from where they would make trips escorting galleons coming from America.

In May 1600, Juan del Águila was imprisoned for "having taken advantage of the tax of the king more than what was just," as reported by Luis Cabrera de Córdoba. He was able to prove his innocence, so that, in reparation, he was given the command of the expedition to support the Irish rebellion against England.

=== Expedition to Ireland ===
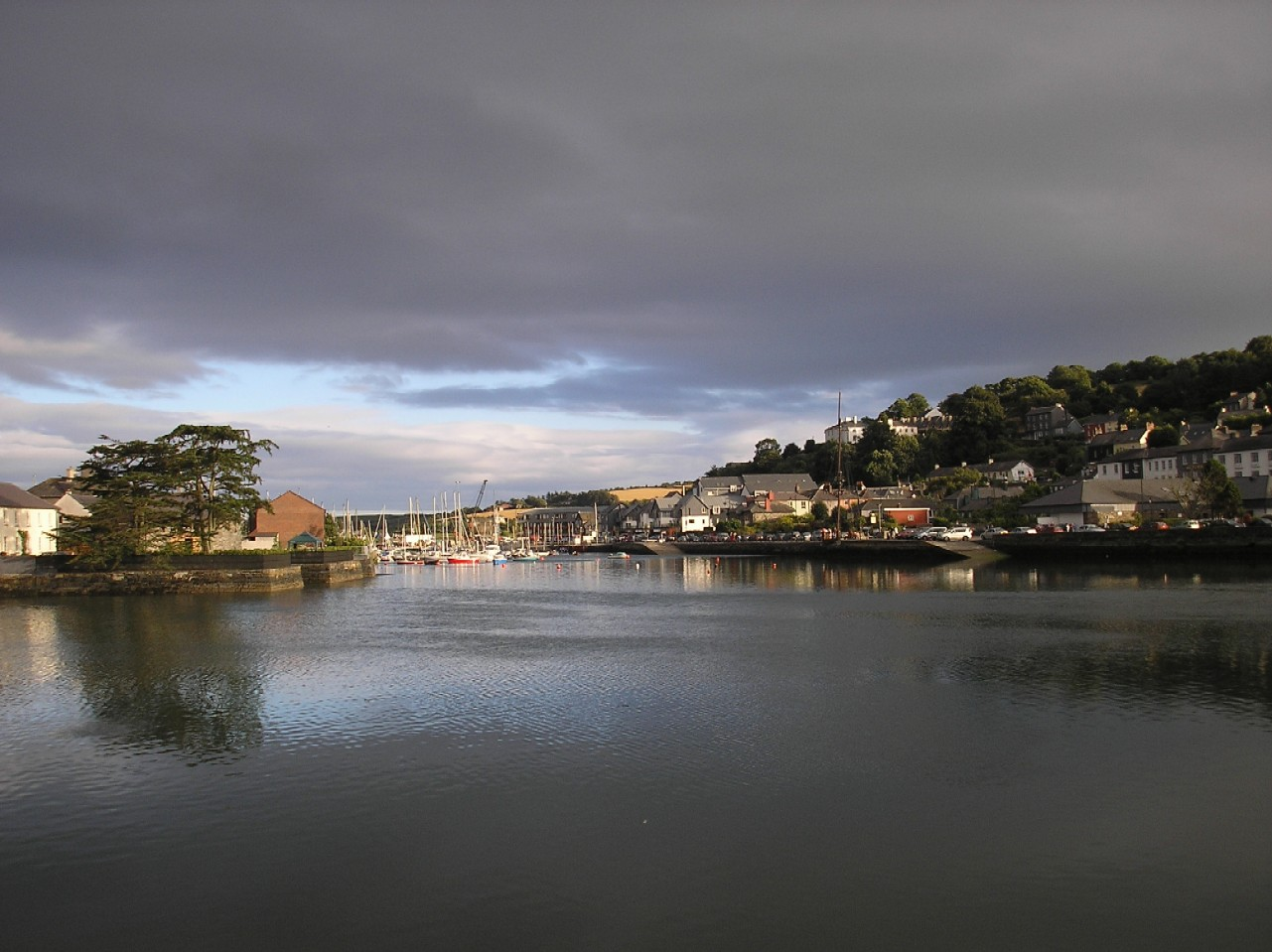
Kinsale Harbour today.

On 2 September 1601 33 ships sailed from Lisbon to Ireland. In total 4,432 men of the Juan del Águila and Francisco de Toledo Tercios. Del Águila held the supreme command of the expedition as its General Maestre de campo. The aim was to take the port of Cork, key southern port of the country and perfect place for a landing.

A strong gale dispersed the fleet near the island of Ouessant. The admiral, Diego Brochero, managed to reach Kinsale on 1 October with the greater part of the vessels. Thus, most men were able to land on Irish soil, but eight or nine ships under Pedro de Zubiaur, along with 650 soldiers and most of the provisions, returned to Galicia.

As soon as they landed, the fleet returned to Spain in search of reinforcements. Juan del Águila stayed with 3,000 men isolated in Kinsale. Allied troops were far from the town and so they could only get 900 poorly armed rookies. He decided to fortify the camp and wait for reinforcements. At the entrance of the bay he had built two forts: Castle Park and Ringcurran.

An English army of 10,000 infantry, 600 horsemen and several cannons under the command of Charles Blount, 5th Baron Mountjoy soon came. Additionally, a small English fleet blockaded the harbour.

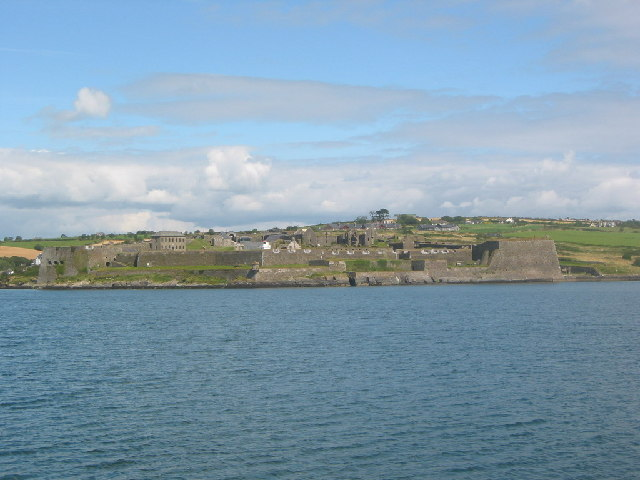
View of the Charles Fort built on the site of Fort Ringcurran.

In November, Mountjoy ordered an attack on Kinsale. The English took the Ringcurran fort, but were repulsed. Soon after, Juan del Águila offered to surrender, which was rejected.

Seeking to rescue Juan del Águila's forces and break the siege, the anti-Tudor coalition of the Irish clans of Ulster under the leadership of Aodh Mór Ó Néill and Red Hugh O'Donnell marched across the whole length of Ireland through extremely bitter winter conditions with 5,500 men. In Spain, Pedro de Zabiaur, left port on 7 December in command of ten ships with 829 soldiers and abundant provisions and ammunition. But a new storm caused four ships to get lost. The rest managed to reach Castlehaven, about 48 km south of Kinsale on 11 December. The nobles of the area swore allegiance to the King of Spain (then Philip III) and provided 550 infantry and a company of cavalry. In addition, the castles of Dunboy (near Castletownbere) and Donneshed (near Baltimore) were given to the Spanish forces.

Blount, alerted to the presence of the new Spanish force in Ireland, sent a fleet of seven ships under Admiral Richard Leveson to Castlehaven to neutralise the Spanish fleet to tighten the blockade. On 16 December, after five hours of fighting, the English were able to sink the Spanish galleon Maria Francisca, capturing a merchantman and forced the Spanish to scuttle the rest of their ships despite the presence of a battery of five guns. The English having achieved success managed to withdraw under fire but lost no ships.

In the morning of that day, 16, 1 December 500 men left Kinsale to try to break the siege. They managed to destroy twenty guns and inflicted hundreds of casualties on the besiegers, but they had to return to the city, unable to cross English lines. Spanish casualties were relatively low, which encouraged the troops.

A rebel army coming from the north, finally managed to link with the Spanish, then decided to help Juan del Águila. But Zabiaur after his fleet had been destroyed at Castlehaven did not want to lose control of Baltimore which could be used for future landings. So he divided his troops, giving the Irish rebels 200 auxiliary infantry while he and the other men secured positions. In the end just under 6,500 men set off for Kinsale.

At that time, the English army had been reduced to 8,000 men due to battle casualties, diseases and desertions.

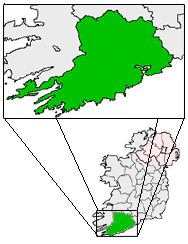
Spanish operations that took place on the County Cork coast.

On 3 January the two armies met at Kinsale. The lack of coordination between the rescue army and the besieged, coupled with the disorganization of the Irish and the superiority of the English cavalry, turned the Battle of Kinsale into a major defeat for the Spanish-Irish coalition.

The Irish began the attack, but were repulsed by the English. Under pressure from the English army, some Irish began to abandon the fight. After that, the English cavalry launched a counterattack, which drove them back and the Irish army fled. The cavalry then began to chase them, causing heavy casualties among the deserters. The intervention of the Spanish infantry prevented greater carnage at the expense of 90 deaths and 52 prisoners. Juan del Águila left the city with his men, but it was already late and they were rejected. In total, 1,200 Irish died at Kinsale.

On 12 January, Juan del Águila surrendered. The terms of the surrender forced the Spanish to surrender their places and castles in Kinsale, Castlehaven, Dunboy, Donneshed and Donnelong (on the island of Sherkin). In return, the Spanish army (then reduced to 1,800 men) and all the Irish who so wished, would receive supplies and transport to return to Spain. Also, they would keep their weapons, flags and money.

On 14 January, just two days later, Martín de Vallecina arrived in Kinsale with reinforcements, but returned to Spain as soon as he learned of the surrender.

=== Return to Spain ===
On 13 March the fleet arrived in A Coruña. There, Juan del Águila paid from his pocket for a field hospital to treat the many wounded.

He remained under house arrest in A Coruña, which prevented him from going to Madrid to explain his actions in Ireland. In Court a War Council was prepared against him but he did not face it as he died in August. According to Emilio González López's account: "Overwhelmed by this arrest, which involved a severe censure of his military conduct in Ireland, Don Juan del Aguila died, probably in early August."

== Supreme War Council ==
On 12 July 1603, the Supreme War Council concluded that "his surrender had represented a loss of reputation." He was also accused of laxity for failing to leave the city in time during the battle. However, the impossibility of him telling his version of the events caused the story to reach the Court via the hands of others who were not involved, and his subsequent death made the Council decide without Juan del Águila's testimony and without him relating his defence of Kinsale for three months against superior forces.

== See also ==
- Eighty Years' War
- Siege of Kinsale
