= Julián Romero =

Spanish military commander (1518–1577)

Julián Romero de Ibarrola
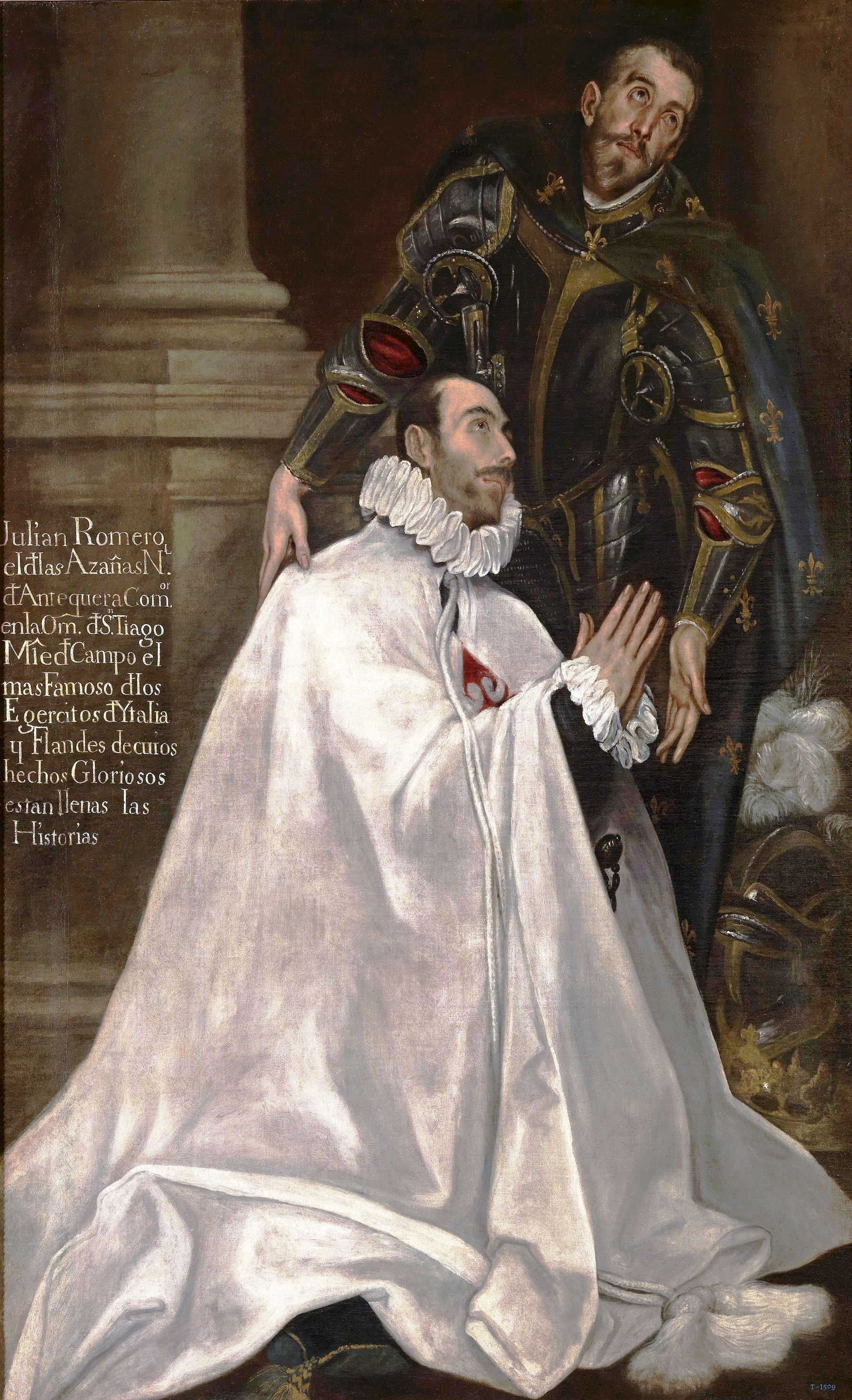
- Julián Romero and Saint Julian by El Greco

Tercio of Sicily
- In office 1565–1577

Personal details
- Born: 1518 Huélamo, Spain
- Died: 1577 (aged 58–59) Felizzano, Duchy of Savoy
- Awards: Order of Santiago

Military service
- Allegiance: Kingdom of Spain
- Branch/service: Spanish Army
- Rank: Maestre de campo
- Battles/wars: Rough Wooing; Battle of Pinkie; Italian War of 1551–1559; Battle of St. Quentin; Battle of Gravelines; Ottoman–Habsburg wars; Great Siege of Malta; Eighty Years' War; Battle of Jemmingen; Siege of Mons; Siege of Haarlem; Siege of Alkmaar; Battle of the Scheldt; Battle of Mookerheyde; Siege of Leiden; Siege of Zierikzee; Sack of Antwerp

Julián Romero de Ibarrola (1518 – 1577) was a 16th century Spanish military commander. He participated in various conflicts in England, Italy, the Holy Roman Empire, the Mediterranean and the Spanish Netherlands.

Throughout his military career he rose from foot soldier to maestre de campo, was made Terico of Sicily, and was awarded the Order of Santiago. He was celebrated in Spain as El de las Hazañas ("He of the Feats").

== Biography ==
Romero was born in Huélamo, Province of Cuenca (Spain). Nothing more is known about his youth. He entered the Spanish army at the age of 16 and was stationed in Flanders. By 1547 he was part of Pedro de Gamboa's Spanish mercenary force commanding a unit as sergeant or captain at the Battle of Pinkie, as ally of the English in their war with Scotland known as the Rough Wooing. King Henry VIII of England was so impressed by his performance, that he made him a banneret, with a yearly pension of £150. Romero's unit was captured during the siege of Haddington at Coldingham in the spring of 1549. He was released and stationed at Cheswick in Northumberland in May 1549.

On July 15, during the signing of peace between Henry VIII and Francis I of France in the Palace of Fontainebleau, Romero represented Henry VIII in a duel against Cristóbal de Mora, a soldier from his unit who had defected to Francis I. During the three-hour duel, Romero lost his sword and lance and had his horse killed under him, but he managed to force Moura to dismount and wrestled him to the ground, where he subdued him with his dagger. He received gifts from both kings for his victory.

Romero fought in the Italian War of 1551–1559, where he distinguished himself in the Battle of St. Quentin (1557), for which he was made a Knight in the Order of Santiago.

In 1565 he was stationed in Sicily, but the following year, the Duke of Alba made him Maestre de campo, and he accompanied the Duke to the Low Countries to crush the Dutch Revolt. In 1568 he commanded the guard at the execution of Counts Egmont and Horn.

Romero fought in the Siege of Mons (1572), where he nearly succeeded in killing William the Silent in a daring raid against the Dutch camp. He was also present at the Massacre of Naarden and the Siege of Haarlem, where he lost an eye. In 1574, he failed to relieve Middelburg after losing the Battle of Reimerswaal, and in 1576 he was present at the Sack of Antwerp.

By the Edict of 1577, most Spanish troops were withdrawn from the Low Countries and Romero was stationed in Cremona. He died of a stroke in Felizzano near Alessandria while he was in charge of transferring Spanish troops back to the territories of the Spanish crown. He was buried in Alessandria in the church of San Giacomo della Vittoria.

== After his death ==
After his death, Julian Romero became in Spain a military hero who gave his life for his country.

He was painted by El Greco around 1612 and José de Cañizares dedicated a play to him (El guapo Julián Romero) in the 18th century.
