= Battle of the Scheldt (1574) =

1574 battle of the Eighty Years' War

- Part of the Eighty Years' War
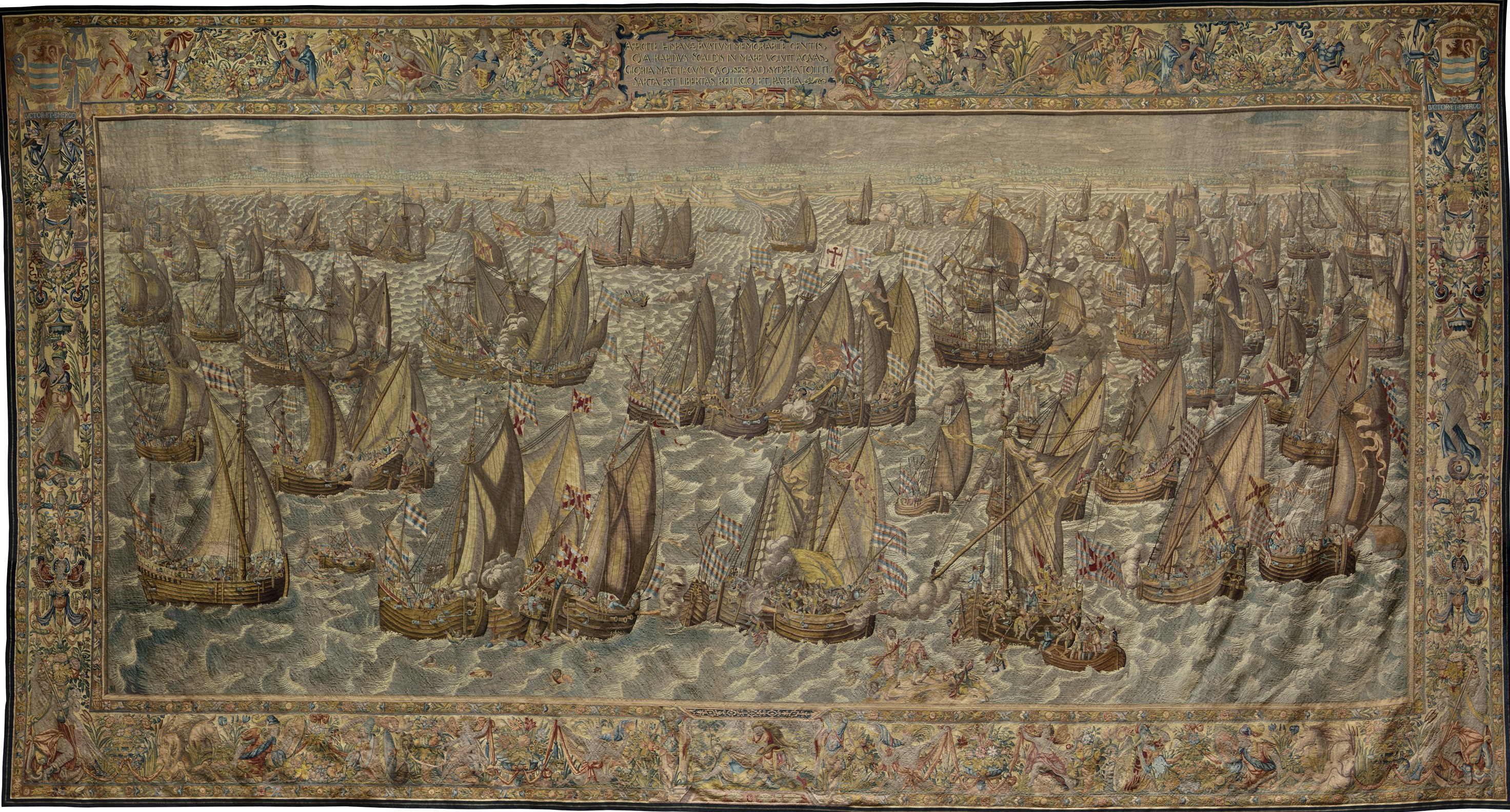
- Tapestry of the battle Made by Hendrick Cornelisz Vroom and Karel van Mander the Younger
Date	29 January 1574
Location	Eastern Scheldt, off Reimerswaal 51°28′N 4°8′E
Result	Dutch victory

Belligerents
Dutch rebels	Spain

Commanders and leaders
Louis de Boisot; Joos de Moor	(Spain) Julián Romero (Spain) Gerard de Glymes †

Strength
64 ships	75 ships

Casualties and losses
300 killed or wounded 2 ships sunk	15 ships sunk 1,200 dead

The Battle of the Scheldt also known as the Battle of Walcheren (known in Dutch as Slag bij Reimerswaal) was a naval battle that took place on 29 January 1574 during the Eighty Years' War. The battle was fought between a Dutch rebel Sea Beggar fleet (which included English and Scottish volunteers) under Lodewijk van Boisot and a Spanish fleet under Julián Romero. The Spanish fleet was attempting to relieve the Spanish held town of Middelburg which was under siege but the fleet under Boisot intercepted them and were victorious with the destruction or capture of nearly fifteen ships. Middelburg as a result then surrendered only nine days later along with Arnemuiden.

== Background ==
In April 1572, the cities of Flushing, Veere, and Arnemuiden, located on the island of Walcheren, had sworn allegiance to the Dutch prince. However, another city on the island, Middelburg, remained loyal to King Philip II of Spain, and as a result was besieged. After more than six months' worth of food, ammunition, and other materials began to run out, the Spanish commander Sancho d'Avila made a second attempt to resupply the city by sea (his first attempt failed. See Battle of Borsele). A third was turned back after Fort Rammekens was captured in August 1573 by a Dutch and English force.

Commanded by Lodewijk van Boisot, Admiral of Zealand, the Dutch wanted to take on the Spanish fleet, and met up with another fleet under Vice Admiral Joos de Moor. At the same time a request was made to reinforce the besiegers around Middelburg. Having picked up sufficient troops which included a number of companies of English and Scots led by Colonel Thomas Morgan, they set out to find the Spanish fleet.

Don Luis de Requesens y Zúñiga, the second Spanish commander during the Dutch revolt, decided to send out a naval force to destroy the Dutch rebels once and for all. In addition, once this was achieved, he hoped he could relieve the Spanish garrison at Middelburg. He ordered Don Julian di Romero and a Flemish admiral Gerard de Glymes to sail to Walcharen in the Scheldt estuary where the beggars operated.

Don Julian di Romero was an able captain on land but had little experience in maritime affairs, a fact he reminded Zúñiga of many times, but his words went unheeded. The fleet with the greatest part of the transports had already set sail but had not advanced farther than Bergen op Zoom. Zúñiga, anxious for its fate, had accompanied it as far as the Scheldt estuary.

== Battle ==
On 29 January, they cast anchor, waited for the rising tide, and then sailed from Bergen. A general salute was fired in honour of the grand commander, but a discharge from one of the ships set fire to its own magazine - the resulting catastrophic explosion not only destroyed the ship but killed everyone on board. The fleet with low morale because of the occurrence then sailed slowly on, when off Walcheren near Reimerswaal they spotted a large fleet. The Spanish thought the ships were friendly and went up to meet them, but they soon discovered that the fleet was in fact the fleet of Lodewijk van Boisot, Admiral of Zealand. They attempted to turn away and with the weather turning for the worse however, it was too late and thus formed line of battle. Boisot ordered an attack and both fleets lined up for battle in the estuary of the Scheldt.

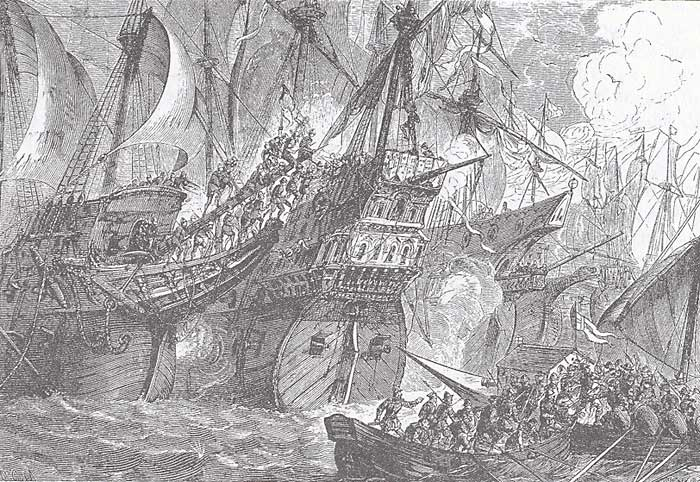
Dutch & English soldiers & sailors boarding the Spanish ships during the battle.

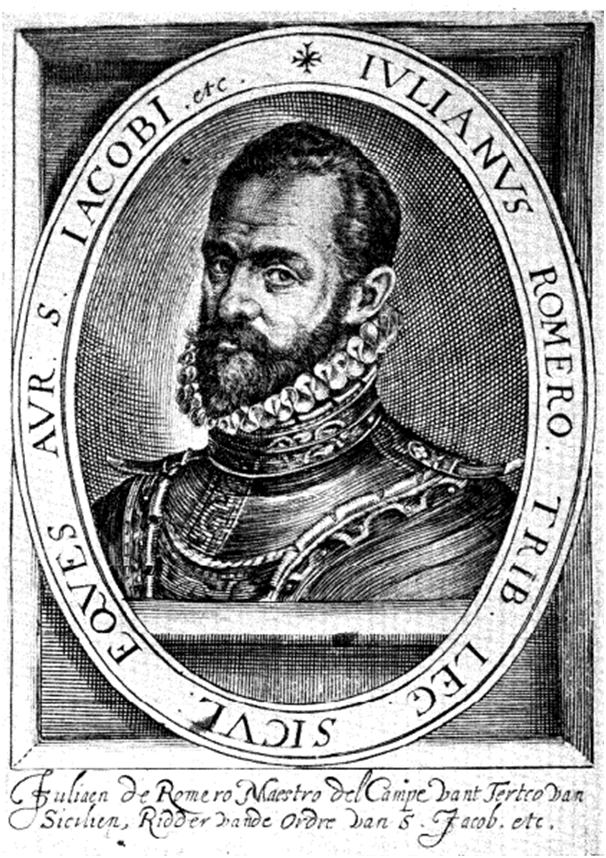
Julian Romero the Spanish commander

The first division of Romero came nearer and delivered its first broadside when Schot and Klaafzoon both fell mortally wounded. Admiral Boisot lost an eye and many officers and sailors in the other vessels were killed or wounded. The soldiers destined for the siege were used heavily in the fight and thus surprised the Spanish. The Dutch ships were able to come alongside and the soldiers were able to board the Spanish ships one by one. As many of Romero's vessels as could be were grappled within the narrow estuary and soon found themselves locked in close combat with each other. A murderous hand-to-hand conflict then took place.

The fight went for two hours but finally the Anglo-Dutch got the upper hand. De Glymes's own ship ran foul of a sand bank from which she could not be disengaged. The Dutch rebels, perceiving her distress, attacked her on every side and after taking a heavy pounding eventually set her on fire. Captain Rowland Yorke with his band of English troops went from Vice Admirals Joos de Moor's flagship and along with Colonel Thomas Morgan's company of English from another Flemish ship boarded a number of Spanish ships. Romero hastened to de Glimes assistance but all his attempts to extinguish the flames proved ineffectual and sank within a few minutes taking the Admiral with her but not before a flaming mast then set fire to Romero's ship. Morgan's men which included the famed soldier Roger Williams were able to take advantage and boarded while Dutch soldiers did so on the other side taking the ship by taking the flag. In the fight they nearly captured Julien Romero but he was able to escape through his porthole as his ship began to burn.

A captain of a Scots company by the name of Robinson led his men and then took the Rear Admiral's ship. The Spanish in complete disorder managed to extricate themselves in the poor weather but lost another five ships in the pursuit, which was halted because of nightfall, and by which time the battle had ended.

== Aftermath ==
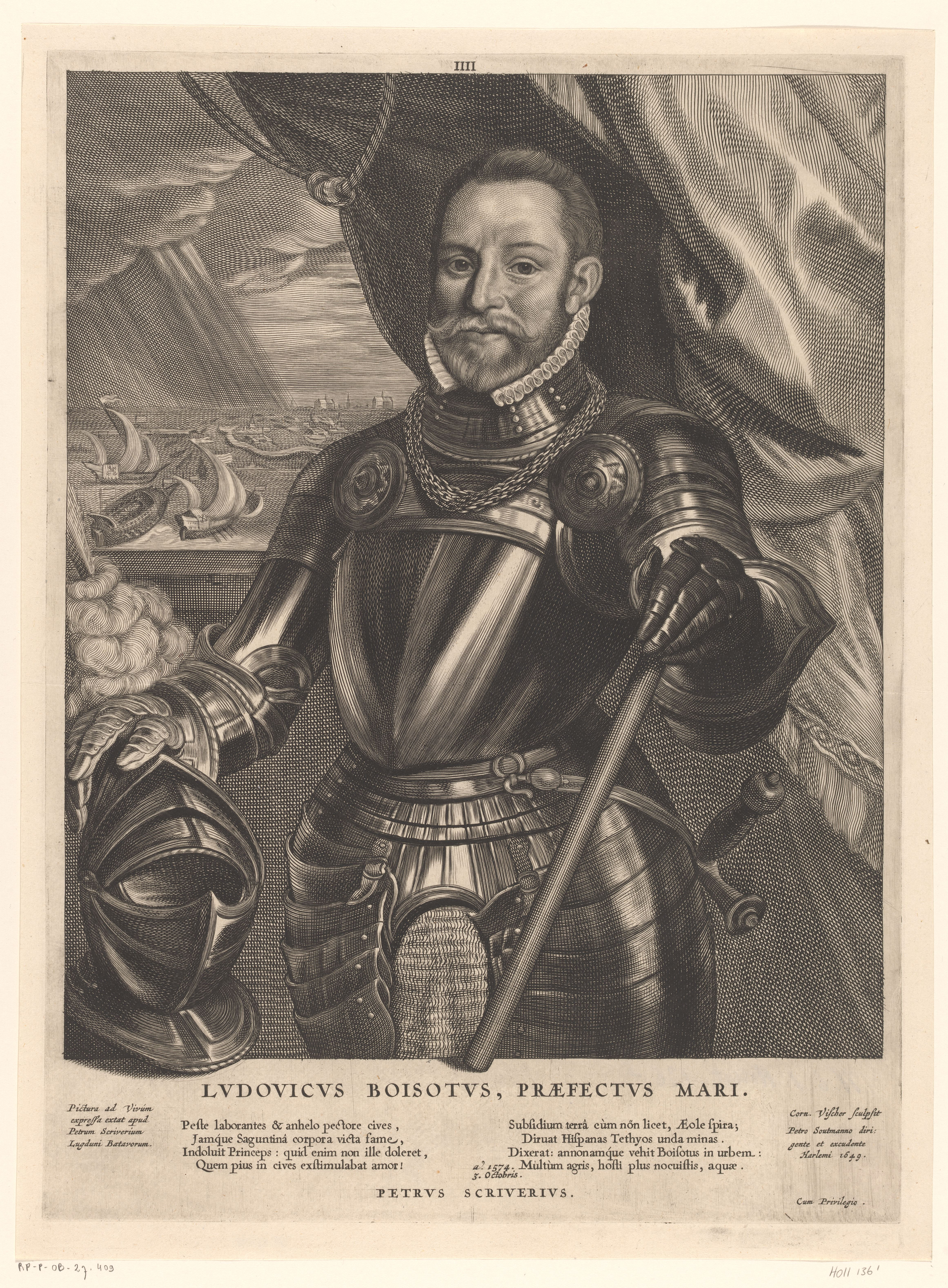
Jonkheer Lodewijk van Boisot who led the fleet

The events unfurled in view of Don Louis Zúñiga, who was standing on the top of a dyke to watch the combat in the pouring rain. Romero waded ashore, soon found Zúñiga and coolly said;

I told your excellency that I was a land fighter, not a sailor - give me a hundred fleets and I would fare no better.

— Romero

The Spanish retreated in disorder to Bergen and by that time had lost fifteen ships captured and sunk with as many as 1,200 killed, wounded, or captured and the Spanish were completely routed. The Dutch fleet with the Anglo-Dutch soldiers had suffered around 300 casualties with the loss of two ships sunk; some had run aground but were later salvaged. The remainder of the Spanish fleet, which had already begun sailing to Flushing, on the news of this disaster retreated with all speed to Antwerp. According to Don Zúñiga the fighting he witnessed was as savage as the battle of Lepanto that he had fought in only three years earlier.

Middelburg as a result then surrendered only nine days later and with it that of Arnemuiden. The two victories combined ensured the Dutch rebels were in possession of the principal islands of Zeeland and in addition rendered them masters of the local seas.

In September, the victorious Anglo-Dutch brought some of the victorious ships and sailors welcome relief to Leiden which had been under siege by the Spanish since 1572.

Philip II, so angered by the defeats that year, decided to send a major force to the North Sea to destroy the English and Sea Beggar fleets but within a year plague, inefficiency, and the death of their commander Pedro Menéndez de Avilés destroyed it as an effective force.

== See also ==
- Siege of Leiden
- Siege of Middelburg (1572–1574)
- States-General of the Netherlands
- List of governors of the Spanish Netherlands

== Bibliography ==
- Bruce & Cogar, Anthony & William (2014). Encyclopedia of Naval History. Routledge. ISBN 9781135935344.
- Braudel, Fernand (1995). The Mediterranean and the Mediterranean World in the Age of Philip II, Volume 1. University of California Press. ISBN 9780520203082.
- Eggenberger, David (2012). An Encyclopedia of Battles: Accounts of Over 1,560 Battles from 1479 B.C. to the Present. Courier Corporation. ISBN 9780486142012.
- Fissel, Mark Charles (2001). English warfare, 1511–1642; Warfare and history. London: Routledge. ISBN 978-0-415-21481-0.
- Frye, Susan (1993). Elizabeth I: The Competition for Representation. Oxford University Press. ISBN 9780199923625.
- Jaques, Tony (2006). Dictionary of Battles and Sieges: A Guide to 8500 Battles from Antiquity Through the Twenty-first Century. Greenwood Press. ISBN 978-0313335365.
- Macgregor, Mary (2007). The Netherlands. Yesterday's Classics. ISBN 9781599151847.
- Parker, Geoffrey (2004). The Army of Flanders and the Spanish Road, 1567-1659: The Logistics of Spanish Victory and Defeat in the Low Countries' Wars. Cambridge University Press. ISBN 9780521543927.
- Pratt, Fletcher (2013). The Battles that Changed History. Courier Corporation. ISBN 9780486318943.
- Rodger, N A M (2004). The Safeguard of the Sea: A Naval History of Britain 660-1649 Volume 1 of A naval history of the sea. Penguin UK. ISBN 9780140297249.
- Sigmond, J.P (2013). Zeemacht in Holland en Zeeland in de zestiende eeuw (Dutch). Uitgeverij Verloren. ISBN 9789087043490.
- Stevens, William (2009). History of Sea Power. BoD – Books on Demand. ISBN 9783861950998.
