= Siege of Morlaix (1594) =

Siege

- Part of the French Wars of Religion
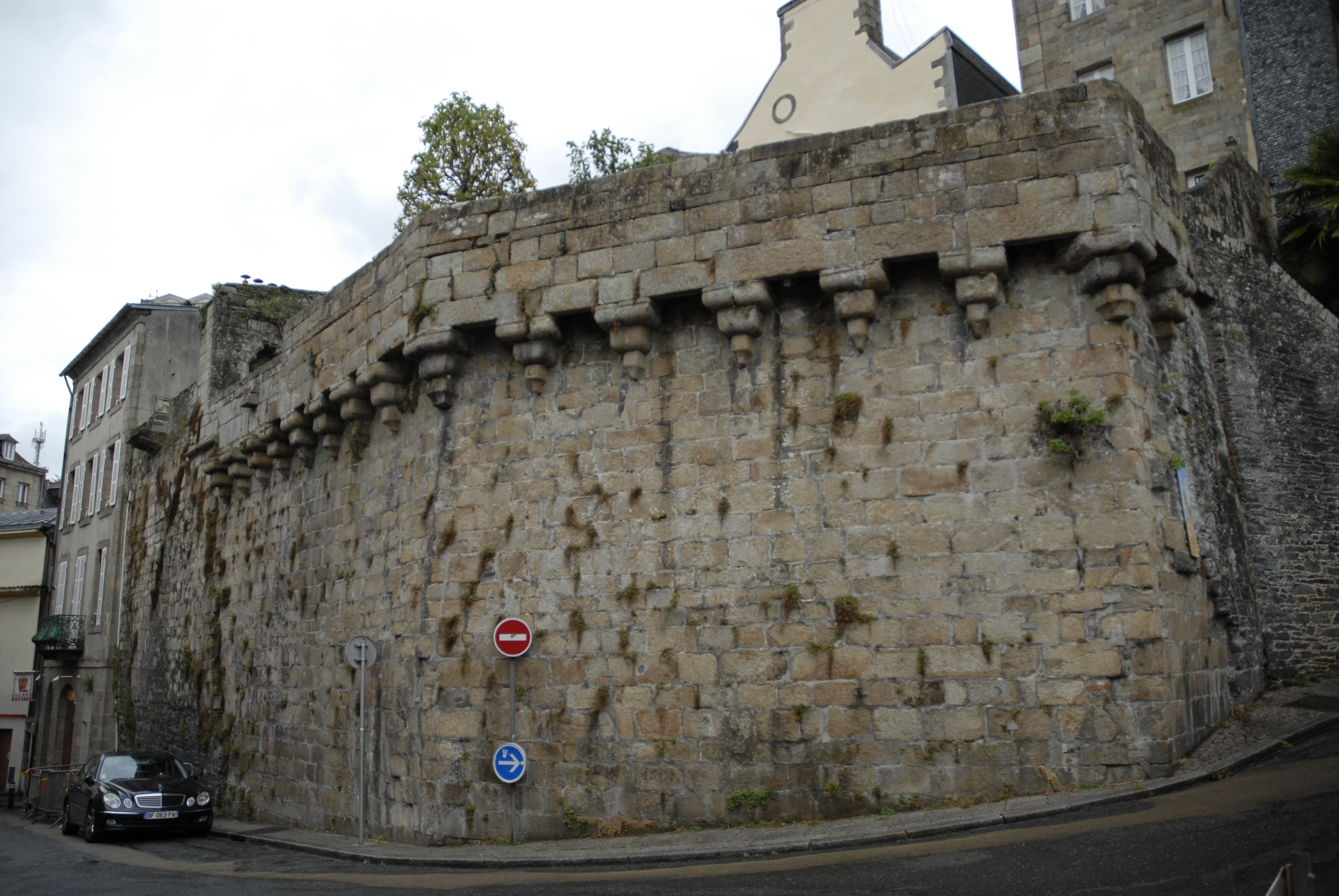
- Ramparts of the old wall of Morlaix
Date	6–17 September 1594
Location	Morlaix, Brittany, France 48.5783°N 3.8267°W
Result	Anglo-Royal French victory

Belligerents
(Kingdom of France) French Royal Army; England	Spain; Catholic League

Commanders and leaders
Marshal d'Aumont (England) John Norreys (England) Martin Frobisher	(Spain) Juan del Águila; Duke of Mercœur

Strength
5,000: 2,000 English; 6 ships	Unknown

Casualties and losses
Low	Garrison surrendered

The siege of Morlaix took place from 6 September to 17 September 1594 during the French Wars of Religion and the Anglo-Spanish War (1585–1604). The siege was fought between the French Royal army under Marshal d'Aumont reinforced by an English contingent under Sir John Norreys who besieged the town of Morlaix, which was held by the combined forces of Spain and the Catholic League of France. A relief force of Spanish troops under the Juan del Águila and another of Leaguers under the Duke of Mercœur were turned back by an English force under John Norreys. With the arrival of a fleet of English ships under Martin Frobisher the garrison swiftly surrendered.

== Background ==
Since 1562 France had been in the grip of the French Wars of Religion, in which Spain had regularly intervened in favour of the Catholic League of France. King Henry IV of France (French: Henri de Bourbon) had been fighting for the Protestant cause, but had converted to Catholicism in Paris on 22 March 1593. The example of Paris was followed by other towns and cities, with several chiefs of the League coming over to the king. Henry now directed his chief attention to the fortified towns of Picardy and Champagne from their contiguity to the Spanish Netherlands. From there he received the forced or voluntary submission of the most considerable and at last began to think seriously of his engagements to Elizabeth I of England.

Marshal Jean d'Aumont was sent into Brittany to join the English army under John Norreys, which had already been fighting there. Several towns enlightened by the presence of d'Aumont with a large body of troops voluntarily declared for the king. The castle of the town of Morlaix was the key to the area which the Catholic Leaguers and Spanish troops held.

== Siege ==
A combined force of Leaguers and Spaniards under the Duke of Mercoeur and Juan d'Aguila, respectively, decided to come to Morlaix's relief. D'Aumont had already joined the English under Norreys - Elizabeth had demanded beforehand that Morlaix should be granted to the English as a place of retreat. D'Aumont, however, decided to evade it by a condition that Catholics alone should be admitted.

D'Aumont learned that his position and that of the Leagues made a looming battle inevitable. Mercour sent a force of Leaguers to Morlaix to make forced marches, and made at least ten leagues in a day, hoping to join up with a Spanish force under Juan Del Aguila. Norreys, with his force, however, moved down the coast to block their path so that they wouldn't link up with the Spanish. His approach unnerved Mercour, who immediately withdrew from the area to fortified positions not far from Morlaix. Norreys sent 700 English troops to demonstrate before Mercour and hastened him to abandon his advantageous positions. Aguila marched his troops and was close to linking up with Mercour's force, but their relief column ran into segments of the detached English. Aguila thought he was up against a much larger force – the Spaniards believed that they totalled 6,000 men but didn't realise that the English were a mere detachment. Aguila, fearing being overwhelmed, then decided to withdraw his men to Blavet on 17 September, which meant that Mercour could not relieve the castle of Morlaix. Tensions reached a boiling point soon after, with Aguila and Mercour both blaming each other for the failure.

Soon matters of the garrison turned for the worse when they spotted an English fleet under Sir Martin Frobisher carrying the siege train of heavy guns for Norreys. On seeing the English ships with their guns run out and on hearing the news that a relief force was not forthcoming from either Mercour or Aguila, the garrison surrendered.

== Aftermath ==
The garrison marched out and the English and French force entered in triumph. The English force under Norreys had dispersed two larger forces; one League and one Spanish and placed them both on the defensive and ultimately forced their retreat. D'Aumont gave high praise to Norreys and allowed him to enter the town first, satisfying Elizabeth's order. As a result of the capture, many more towns soon joined the King's side. Soon after Quimper and Guingamp were captured by Norreys - but the real prize was Brest; in particular the Spanish fort on the headland commanding the Gironde. The fort was taken in a brutal assault which cost the entire garrison but also nearly a quarter of the besieging force, which included Martin Frobisher and denied the Spanish a major base there.

English troops left France in February the following year and Elizabeth was able to redeploy her troops back to the Netherlands.

== Bibliography ==
- Bicheno, Hugh (2012). Elizabeth's Sea Dogs: How England's Mariners Became the Scourge of the Seas. Conway. ISBN 978-1844861743.
- Clowes, William Laird (1996). The Royal Navy: A History from the Earliest Times to 1900. Chatham Publishing. ISBN 9781861760104.
- Doran, Susan (2002). Elizabeth I and Foreign Policy, 1558–1603 – Lancaster Pamphlets. Routledge. ISBN 9781134741199.
- Mark Charles Fissel (2006). Trim, David J. B. (ed.). Amphibious Warfare 1000–1700: Commerce, State Formation and European Expansion Volume 34 of History of warfare. Brill Publishers. ISBN 9789004132443.
- Hadfield & Hammond, Andrew & Paul (2014). Shakespeare And Renaissance Europe (Arden Critical Companions). A & C Black. ISBN 9781408143681.
- Horne, Alistair (2003). Seven Ages of Paris. Pan Books. ISBN 9780330488648.
- MacCaffrey, Wallace T. (1994). Elizabeth I: War and Politics, 1588–1603. Princeton University Press. ISBN 9780691036519.
- McDermott, James (2001). Martin Frobisher: Elizabethan Privateer. Yale University Press. ISBN 9780300083804.
- Nolan, John S. (1997). Sir John Norreys and the Elizabethan Military World. University of Exeter Press. ISBN 9780859895484.
- Thornton, Tim (2012). The Channel Islands, 1370–1640: Between England and Normandy. Boydell & Brewer. ISBN 9781843837114.
- Ungerer, Gustav (1976). A Spaniard in Elizabethan England: The Correspondence of Antonio Pérez's Exile, Volume 1. Boydell & Brewer. ISBN 9780900411847.
