= Siege of Fort Crozon =

1594 siege

- Part of the Anglo–Spanish War and the French Wars of Religion
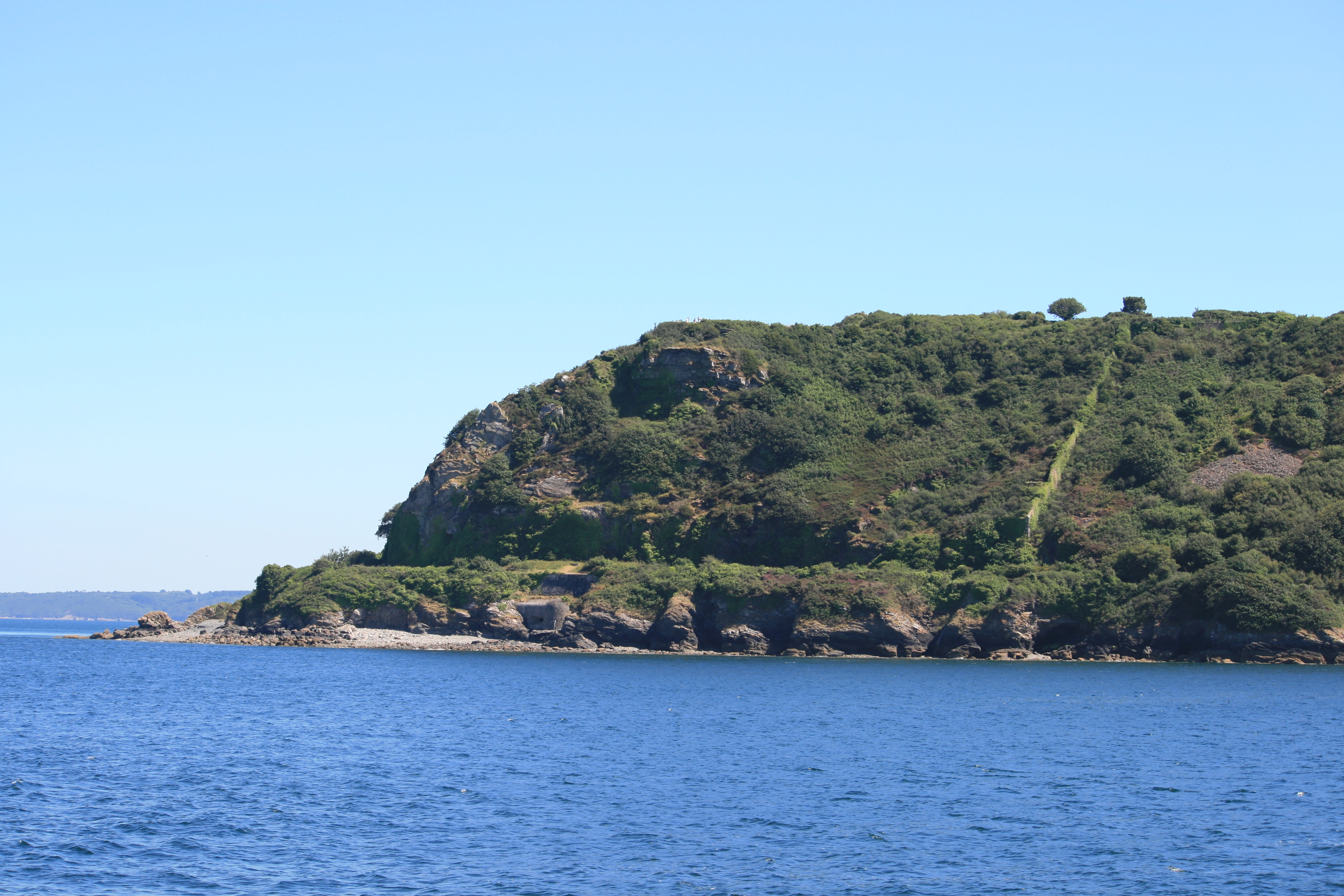
- Pointe des Espagnols – present day area where the siege took place
Date	1 October – 19 November 1594
Location	Present day Pointe des Espagnols, France 48°20′24.57″N 4°32′6.95″W
Result	Anglo-French victory

Belligerents
England; Kingdom of France	Spain

Commanders and leaders
Jean VI d'Aumont (Kingdom of England) John Norreys (Kingdom of England) Martin Frobisher †	(Spain) Tomé de Paredes † (Spain) Juan del Águila

Strength
(Kingdom of England) 3,000 troops, 10 ships and 1,200 sailors 3,000 infantry, 300 cavalry and 400 knights	(Spain) 400 (Crozon), 4,000 (Relief)

Casualties and losses
700 killed and wounded or sick and dead to disease	(Crozon) 400; only 13 survivors (relief) Unknown

The siege of Fort Crozon or the siege of El Leon was a land and sea engagement that took place as part of Spain's Brittany campaign late in the French Wars of Religion and the Anglo-Spanish War (1585–1604). The siege was fought between 1 October and 19 November 1594 and was conducted by English and French troops against a Spanish fort constructed on the Crozon Peninsula near Brest. After a number of assaults were repelled, a Spanish relief force under Juan del Águila attempted to relieve the garrison, but it was delayed by French cavalry and could not reach the garrison in time.

An assault by the English using a deceitful ruse ended the siege when the defenders were all but put to the sword. The victory proved decisive in two ways. First, it denied the Spanish an important large independent base and port from which to operate in Brittany against the English and Dutch. Second, the Spanish had lost most of their support from the French Catholic League, and as a result enabled the French king Henry IV to declare war on Spain.

== Background ==
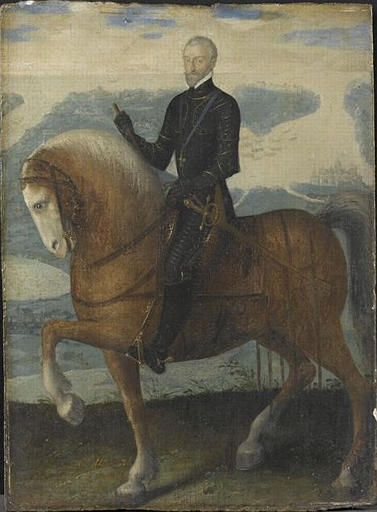
Jean VI d'Aumont, the French commander

In the wake of reorganising his navy, King Philip II of Spain was intent on establishing advanced bases in western France from which his navy could constantly threaten England and Ireland. In 1593 Blavet had been established by the Spanish in Brittany and news of this caused concern in England. Reports of a Spanish expedition under Juan del Águila hoping to seize the major port of Brest caused greater concern and John Norreys, already in France, wrote a warning letter to the Queen. Elizabeth, seeing the danger, ordered Norreys to join with Martin Frobisher and expel the Spanish.

As part of Spanish preparations for an intended siege of Brest, a well-situated fort was to be built on the peninsula completely commanding the Roadstead of Brest. Águila's chief engineer, Captain Cristóbal de Rojas, designed a modern fortification, christened El Leon – companies took turns in construction, foraging, and defence. Spanish admiral Pedro de Zubiaur arrived with twelve ships, landing equipment, which accelerated the construction of the fort, and two shaped bastions with a glacis were formed in front of the drawbridge guarding where the peninsula joined the mainland. The fort had a significant number of guns, one bastion containing eighteen culverins and another smaller bastion had six; many of these guns were brought by the fleet of Zubiaur. Don Tomé de Paredes was appointed commander of the garrison of the fort, with his company, that of Diego de Aller and Pedro Ortiz Dogaleño totalling 401 men, with a mission to complete the construction of the fort. All this was created in a mere twenty six days of construction.

In June, 1,000 veteran English troops led by Sir Thomas Baskerville, who had been fighting in the Netherlands, were the first to arrive, landing at Paimpol. This was joined in August by another force of 2,000 soldiers from Plymouth under the command of John Norreys and ten ships of war with 1,200 sailors and marines commanded by Martin Frobisher in his flagship Vanguard. Within Norreys force were fifty pioneers levied by Sir Walter Raleigh from the tin miners of Cornwall. With their successes in the Netherlands under Francis Vere during the sieges of Steenwijk, Coevorden, and Groningen between 1592 and 1594, they were to construct mines under the fort.

The French under the overall command of Jean VI d'Aumont consisted of 3,000 troops, under the command of Baron de Molac, 300 mounted arquebusiers and 400 knights. In Brest itself an army of militia was hastily assembled and formed under the command of René de Rieux, Lord of Sourdéac, however this was to take no part in the siege but was a stopgap if Brest itself became besieged.

In the opening campaign, the town of Morlaix was besieged and captured from the Spanish and Leaguer forces in September. The town of Quimper was taken next and in October the Anglo-French force headed towards Brest to lay siege to the Crozon peninsula.

== Siege ==
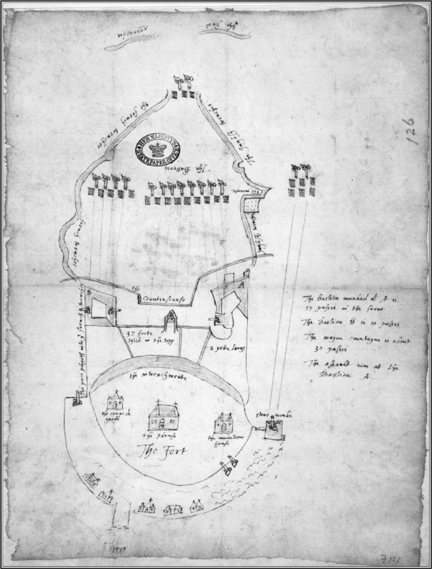
The Spanish fort El Léon at Crozon in a field sketch by English officer John Norreys in 1594.

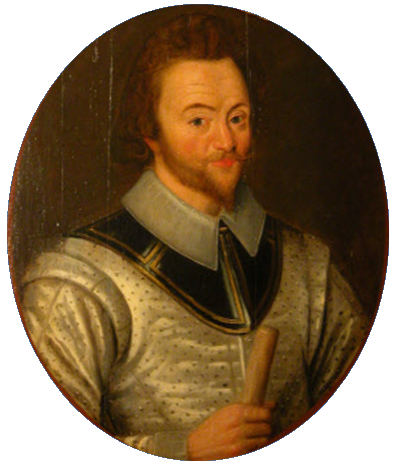
Sir John Norreys - commander of English forces in France

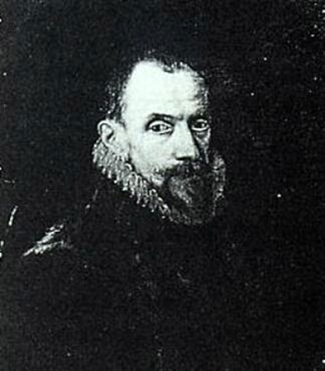
Juan del Águila

On 1 October the siege began when Frobisher's ships arrived and blockaded the fort (which was still not finished) and fired off a desultory bombardment before the land force arrived. The besieging army arrived soon after and began to open trenches on 11 October, supported by cannon fire from the sea by English ships. The besiegers however suffered from the Spanish artillery fire during the installation of wicker filled gabions, trenches, and artillery emplacements. They also had to cope with sorties from the Spanish bastions, day and night, so that the siege positions were not permanently positioned.

Once the heavy artillery (twelve guns) were in place, however, continuous fire from these began to take its effect on the besieged. Soon after, the French launched an assault on a bastion on the right side and the English on the left. The battle lasted three hours, but in the confusion, a tremendous explosion appeared behind the attacking French, causing the attackers to retreat in panic, fearing a Spanish attack in the rear. It had turned out that several huge barrels of gunpowder blew up in one of the main French siege batteries (either ignited by accident or by a stray Spanish shot), killing or wounding many.

A lull in the siege took place as the English and French needed rearming with new powder, which had to come from Brest and the English ships. The advantage of this time taken by the Spanish was to finish off the walls and repair the bastions. At the same Cornish pioneers had been trying to mine the fort.

On 1 November the Spanish then launched a major sally against the siege batteries - they surprised the defenders, continued all the way until they reached a large French battery. Here they spiked three siege guns, and returned to the fort before Baron de Molac's troops could react. The Spanish had inflicted heavy losses, having lost only eleven men in their attack.

The besiegers' battery fire dwindled slightly, but the powder and ammunition began to run low in the fort. Paredes then sent for reinforcements to Juan Aguila. Despite the protests of Mercœur, Águila decided to send a relief force in order to avoid a defeat. Águila's relief force started off having been delayed because he did not have cavalry, but continued on with 4,000 infantry and two pieces of artillery. The French cavalry force armed with arquebusiers numbering 300 made frequent attacks, delaying Águila further. Aumont received news of Águila's relief force and ordered the besiegers to double their efforts, in particular putting pressure on the miners to complete the mining for detonation and to launch an immediate assault.

On 17 November the mine was complete and promptly blown, causing huge damage to the fort's wall and killing and injuring around fifty of the garrison. French and English artillery completed the destruction and a full breach was made. The assault was ready for the following evening; the columns of attack were prepared - the English were on the right and the French were on the left. One of the English columns was formed by sailors and marines commanded by Martin Frobisher. Three large assaults were made by the columns and there was desperate fighting in the breach; a cannonball killed Paredes whilst leading his troops in defence. After bitter fighting, the attacks were called off as there were fears and rumours that Águila had arrived with his relief force – among the many casualties from the breach was Frobisher, who was carried away.

The rumours were false about Águila – he was only four miles from the fort, hoping to relieve the defenders the next day and take the besiegers by surprise. During the evening word got through to the garrison of Águila's approach and there was much hope for victory particularly after the repulse of the attack but the Spanish had very little ammunition and only one officer was left alive unwounded.

For the besiegers, desperate measures were to be made; at nightfall an English officer approached the bastion with a flag of truce. This was a ruse – behind him in the dark, Norrey's English soldiers quietly approached hoping to take advantage of the situation. The ruse was successful – they then threw themselves at the breach and this time swept in, overwhelming the Spanish in desperate hand-to-hand fighting. The Spanish fought bravely but were all eventually put to the sword; no quarter was given even if there were women and children inside.

When news of the fort's fall reached him, Águila, who was only a few miles away, led a hasty retreat, leaving behind his heavy baggage and artillery in order to escape a feared trap.

== Aftermath ==
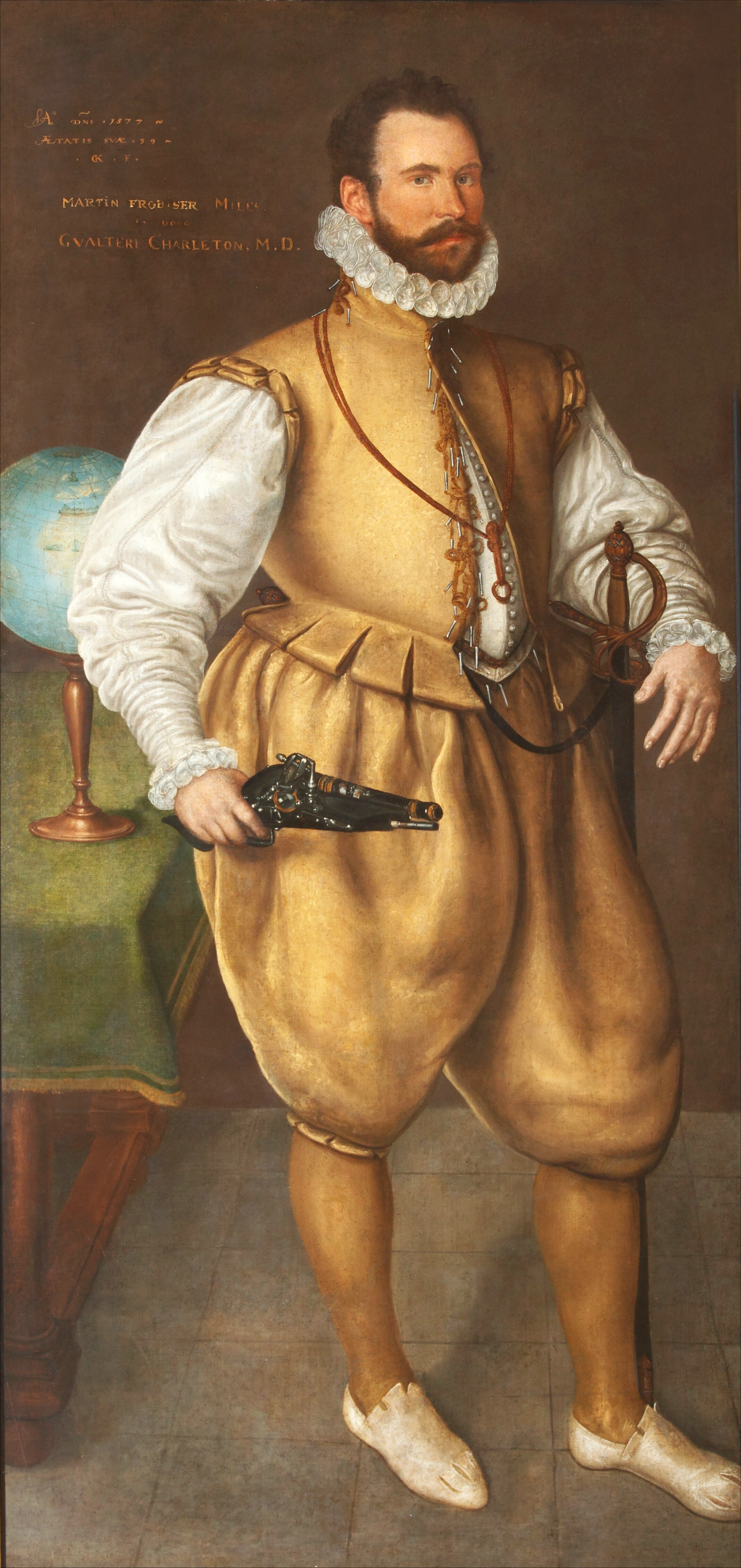
Martin Frobisher who died of wounds sustained at the siege

The Anglo-French force then consolidated itself in the fort. The French criticized the English, in particular Norreys, for their conduct in storming the fort, and Aumont ordered any remaining survivors to be respected as prisoners of war. Out of 400 Spanish soldiers, only thirteen survived; nine soldiers survived having managed to hide among the dead and taken prisoner, and four managed to make their way to the rocks towards the sea. English and French losses amounted to 700, which included dead by combat or disease - most of the casualties in the actual fighting were French. The French Marshal Liscoet and the Lord Romegon had died in the breach. Frobisher, on the navy's return to Plymouth, died from his wound because gangrene had set in. Sourdéac's militia arrived soon after the battle and immediately began to completely raze the fort until nothing was left. Norreys meanwhile then pressed southward in an attempt to bring Águila and his remaining troops into battle, but Águila retreated further away. The Duke of Mercœur, on hearing of the defeat, was furious and threatened to crush Aumont and take Brest himself with his own army.

The defence of the Spanish was admired by their opposite numbers; the body of Paredes was buried in the Church of Brest with full military honours. The prisoners were then released and sent back to Águila; Aumont had praised their bravery in the defence in the letters he gave and themselves told the news of the final storming and the subsequent massacre. On Elizabeth's Ascension Day in November, three captured Spanish standards from the campaign were presented to her and Norreys was hailed a hero. English troops left France in February the following year and Elizabeth was able to redeploy her troops back to the Netherlands. The Spanish retention of Blavet allowed for a spoiling attack on Cornwall the following year, but this was only a minor descent that proved that England's defences were found wanting.

For the Spanish, the defeat at Crozon was a disaster. The defeat effectively ended their hopes to use Brest as a launching point for an invasion of England and gave Philip II a further blow to his naval aspirations. In addition, in the wake of the defeat, support for the league rapidly waned soon after; serious strains soon emerged between the Spanish forces, Mercour, and other members of the league. The French king Henry IV, in this opportunist moment, then declared war on Spain on 17 January 1595, which would last until the Peace of Vervins, signed three years later. Águila would later take part in the disastrous 4th Spanish Armada to Ireland in 1601, which ended in defeat at the siege of Kinsale.

=== Legacy ===
Both Samuel de Champlain and Martin Frobisher, two early explorers of Canada, were at this siege and most probably met there and knew one another.

Soon after the destruction, the French named the place Pointe des Espagnols in tribute to the courage of the defenders.

== Bibliography ==
- Fischer, David Hackett (2009). Champlain's Dream. Simon and Schuster. ISBN 9781416593331.
- Fissel, Mark Charles (2001). English Warfare, 1511–1642. Psychology Press. ISBN 9780415214827.
- Garrido, José Antonio Álvaro; Arsenal, León; Prado, Fernando (2008). Rincones de historia española: Episodios históricos, fabulosos y desconocidos a través de los siglos (Spanish). EDAF. ISBN 9788441420502.
- Gorrochategui Santos, Luis (2018). English Armada: The Greatest Naval Disaster in English History. Bloomsbury Publishing. ISBN 978-1350016996.
- Hadfield & Hammond, Andrew & Paul (2014). Shakespeare And Renaissance Europe (Arden Critical Companions). A & C Black. ISBN 9781408143681.
- Heidenreich, Conrad; Ritch, K. Janet (2010). Samuel de Champlain Before 1604: Des Sauvages and Other Documents Related to the Period Volume 71 of Publications of the Champlain Society Conrad. McGill–Queen's University Press. ISBN 9780773537576.
- Innes, A.D. (2012). England under the Tudors. Amazon Kindle. ISBN 9781176595903.
- Loades, David (2006). Elizabeth I: A Life. A & C Black. ISBN 9781852855208.
- Longmate, Norman (2001). Defending the Island: From Caesar to the Armada. Pimlico Academy. ISBN 9780712667111.
- Nolan, John S. (1997). Sir John Norreys and the Elizabethan Military World. University of Exeter Press. p. 5. ISBN 9780859895484.
- MacCaffrey, Wallace T. (1994). Elizabeth I: War and Politics, 1588–1603. Princeton University Press. ISBN 9780691036519.
- McFee, William (1928). The life of Sir Martin Frobisher Golden hind series. Harper (publisher).
- Wernham, Richard Bruce (1984). After the Armada: Elizabethan England and the Struggle for Western Europe, 1588–1595. Clarendon Press. ISBN 9780198227533.
