= Tercio of Sicily =

Historical military unit of the Spanish armies

Coat of Arms of the Infantry Regiment "Tercio Viejo de Sicilia" Nº 67, depicting the campaigns in which the tercio participated in as well as those of the units that succeeded it.

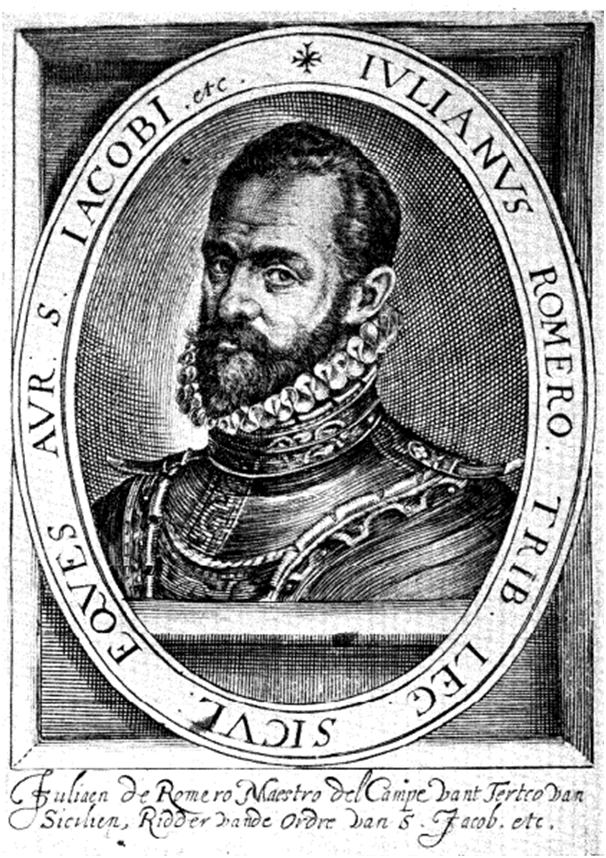
Julián Romero, maestre de campo of the Tercio of Sicily, knight of the Order of Santiago.

The Tercio of Sicily (Spanish: Tercio Viejo de Sicilia) was one of the tercios that were created by a 1534 decree of Charles V, Holy Roman Emperor. Since the 18th century, the Spanish army has maintained the tradition of this tercio in its regiments.

The purpose of this regiment was to protect the Spanish possessions in Italy from enemy attack.

The name includes "viejo" ("old") because it is one of the three first tercios created and originally comprised 12 companies (each consisting of 150-200 men). The tercio was stationed throughout Sicily as well as in Calabria, Marina de Catanzaro.

Its first mission was a successful expedition to occupy La Goulette, at the time under Ottoman control. Between 1542 and 1544, it was stationed in France and in Piedmont. Later, in 1550, it undertook several campaigns against the Ottomans and through 1571, when the Ottoman forces were routed at the Battle of Lepanto, at which the tercio also participated.

The tercio was part of the Spanish relief force that helped lift the Ottoman siege of Malta in 1565.

Between 1571 and 1588 the Tercio of Sicily fought in Flanders against Prince William the Silent, in Tunis against the Ottomans, and in 1580 in the War of the Portuguese Succession. In 1588, the tercio lost a large number of men in the destruction of the Spanish Armada.

In the early part of the 17th century, the unit became known as the "Permanent Tercio of Sicily" Spanish: Tercio Fijo de Sicilia since it had been on that island for two centuries, even though it had participated in expedition against the Turks and in France. In the latter part of the century, the tercio found itself in France again and later was assigned the quelling of the rebellion of the Kingdom of Sardinia in 1699 and Messina in 1673.

== Regimental history and current status ==
In 1705, the tercio was restructured into three units and two years later was converted into a regiment of two battalions. In 1715, another battalion was created with the remainder of the regiments of "Africa", "Vilches", and "Ecija", later being renamed to the "Regiment of Africa".

In 1719 the regiment was stationed in Pamplona, later moving to Ceuta, Barcelona, the Balearic Islands, Barcelona again, Cartagena, Madrid, Zaragoza, Pamplona again, San Sebastián, Zamora, Santander, and La Coruña. During the 18th century, the tercio participated in Italian campaigns as well as those in Portugal, Spanish America, and north Africa. That century saw three shipwrecks that nearly decimated its numbers, the last one being in 1802 off the coast of Galicia.

During the Peninsular War the tercio saw action at the battles of Bailén, Tudela, Talavera, Ocaña, Chiclana, and Sagunto.

In 1837 the tercio took part in the First Carlist War in the battle of Huesca and later in Africa at Tetuán and Wad-Ras. In 1873, during the Third Carlist War, it fought at Puente la Reina, Montejurra, and Velabieta.

In 1893 its original name was restored and started being called "Infantry Regiment 'Sicily' No. 7" (Spanish: Regimiento de Infantería "Sicilia" n.º 7). In 1922, the regiment participated in the Rif War capturing Tazarut and Harcha. In May 1931, a month after the proclamation of the Second Spanish Republic, the regiment was converted to a mountain battalion and was sent to Pamplona. Just before the Spanish Civil War, it was renamed multiple times before becoming the Mountain Battalion Sicily No. 8 (Spanish: Batallón de Montaña Sicilia n.º 8) in 1936.

After the war and several more restructures and name changes, in 1966 it was named "Mountain Infantry Regiment Sicily No 67" (Spanish: Regimiento de Infantería de Montaña Sicilia n.º 67 with battalions in San Sebastián and Irún. It was later renamed to Regimiento de Cazadores de Montaña Tercio Viejo de Sicilia, remaining part of the 5th Mountain Division, and in 1994 with the celebration of its 450th anniversary, it had its original name restored to Regimiento de Infantería Ligera "Tercio Viejo Sicilia" n.º 67. Its units participated in international missions in Bosnia Herzegovina, Lebanon, Kosovo, Iraq, and Afghanistan. Since 2016, its name has been Regimiento de Infantería "Tercio Viejo Sicilia" n.º 67.

=== Current insignia ===
1st-67 Motorized Infantry Battalion "Legazpi" I/67
