= Marquis of Feria =

Spanish noble title

Marquisate of Feria
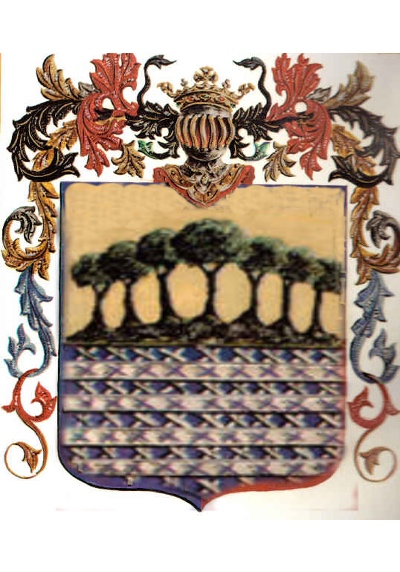
- Creation date: 14 July 1704
- Created by: Philip V
- Peerage: Spanish nobility
- First holder: Francisco Félix de Vega y Cruzat
- Present holder: Bertrán Cruzat Quijano

Marquis of Feria (Spanish: Marqués de Feria is a Spanish title of nobility created in 1704 by King Philip V of Spain for the Maestre de Campo Francisco Félix de Vega y Cruzat, for the services he rendered while in the military, especially while in Naples.

Francisco Félix de Vega y Cruzat started his military career as a simple soldier and rose in the ranks through his actions in battle to become a cavalry captain. His career took him to lieutenant maestre de campo, General in Naples, Governor of Pescara, and Maestre de Campo in Capua. Finally, he was named Governor of the Cartle of Barletta.

The title is toponymic in reference to the ancient location of "La Feria" in the Kingdom of Navarre, near Tafalla and Olite. In Tafalla, the ancient palace of the Marquesses of Feria still remains.
