= Maestre de campo =

Military rank in the Spanish Empire

Maestre de campo was a rank created in 1534 by the Emperor Charles I of Spain, inferior in rank only to the capitán general and acted as a chief of staff. He was chosen by the monarch in the Council of State, and commanded a tercio. Their powers were similar to those of the old marshals of the Kingdom of Castile: they had the power to administer justice and to regulate the food supply. Their personal guard consisted of eight German halberdiers, paid by the king, who accompanied them everywhere. Immediately inferior in the chain of command was the sargento mayor. One of the most famous maestre de campos was Julian Romero, a common soldier who reached that rank and that brought victory to the Spanish tercios at the battles of San Quintín and Gravelines.

In the overseas colonies of the Spanish Empire a governor held the rank of capitán general over his local forces and would appoint his maestre de campo.

== Notable Maestres de Campo ==
Name	Area/Tercio	Year(s)	Notes
Álvaro de Sande	Tercio of Savoy	1537	General Maestre de Campo of the entire Imperial Army in Italy.
Juan de Guevara y Guzmán	Tercio of Savoy	1553	
Alonso de Navarrete	Tercio of Savoy	1554	
Sancho de Londoño	Tercio de Lombardía	1558	
Julián Romero	Tercio of Sicily	1565-1577	
Diego Enríquez de Castañeda y Manrique	Tercio of Sicily	1569-1601	
Francisco de Valdés	Spanish Netherlands	1573-1574	
Francisco de Valdés	Tercio of Italy	1574-1575	
Francisco de Valdés	Tercio of the Two Sicilies	1578-1580	
Cristóbal de Mondragón	Tercio of Sicily	1582-1592	
Cristóbal de Mondragón	Maestre de Campo General of the armies in Flanders	1592-1596	
Juan del Águila y Arellano	Tercio of Sicily	1584-1598	
Juan del Águila y Arellano	Maestre de Campo General of the Spanish Armada in Ireland	1600-1602	
Agustín Messía Carrillo y Manrique de Lara	Maestre de Campo de Infantería Española	1587-96	
Agustín Messía Carrillo y Manrique de Lara	Maestre de Campo General de España	1609	
Fernando Girón de Salcedo y Briviesca	Maestre de Campo de Infantería Española	1597-1605	
Fernando Girón de Salcedo y Briviesca	Aragon	1610-1615	
Lope de Figueroa y Barradas (c.1541 - 1585)	Tercio Costa de Granada	1569-1584	Renamed in 1573 to Tercio de la Sacra Liga
Lope de Figueroa y Barradas (c.1541 - 1585)	Portugal	1583	
Fernando Álvarez de Toledo	Tercio of Savoy	1605-1610	
Fernando Álvarez de Toledo	Portugal	1638	
Francisco de Ibarra y Barresi	Tercio de Fernández de Córdoba	1622	
Paul-Bernard de Fontaines	Maestre de campo general of the Army of Flanders	1838	
Luis Francisco de Benavides y Carrillo de Toledo, Marquis of Caracena	Flanders	1639	
Juan Martínez de Vergara	Chile	1640	
Francisco Fernández de la Cueva, Duke of Alburquerque	Maestre de Campo de Infantería Española	1641	
Clemente Soriano	Tercio Clemente Soriano	1641	
Juan de Salazar	Chile	1651	
Francisco Maniago	Mexico/La Pampanga	1660	Maestro de Campo of Mexico until 1660. Led a rebellion against Spanish rule for violating Kapampangan freedom from tribute, then laid down his arms after Governor-General de Lara granted his requests. Appointed Maestro de Campo of La Pampanga afterwards.
Francisco Dávila Orejón		1684	Author of Política y Mecánica militar, para Sargento Mayor de Tercio
Francisco Félix de Vega y Cruzat, Marquis of Feria	Italy	1704	

== See also ==
- Captain general
- Sargento mayor
- Tercio
