= Huélamo =

- Municipality
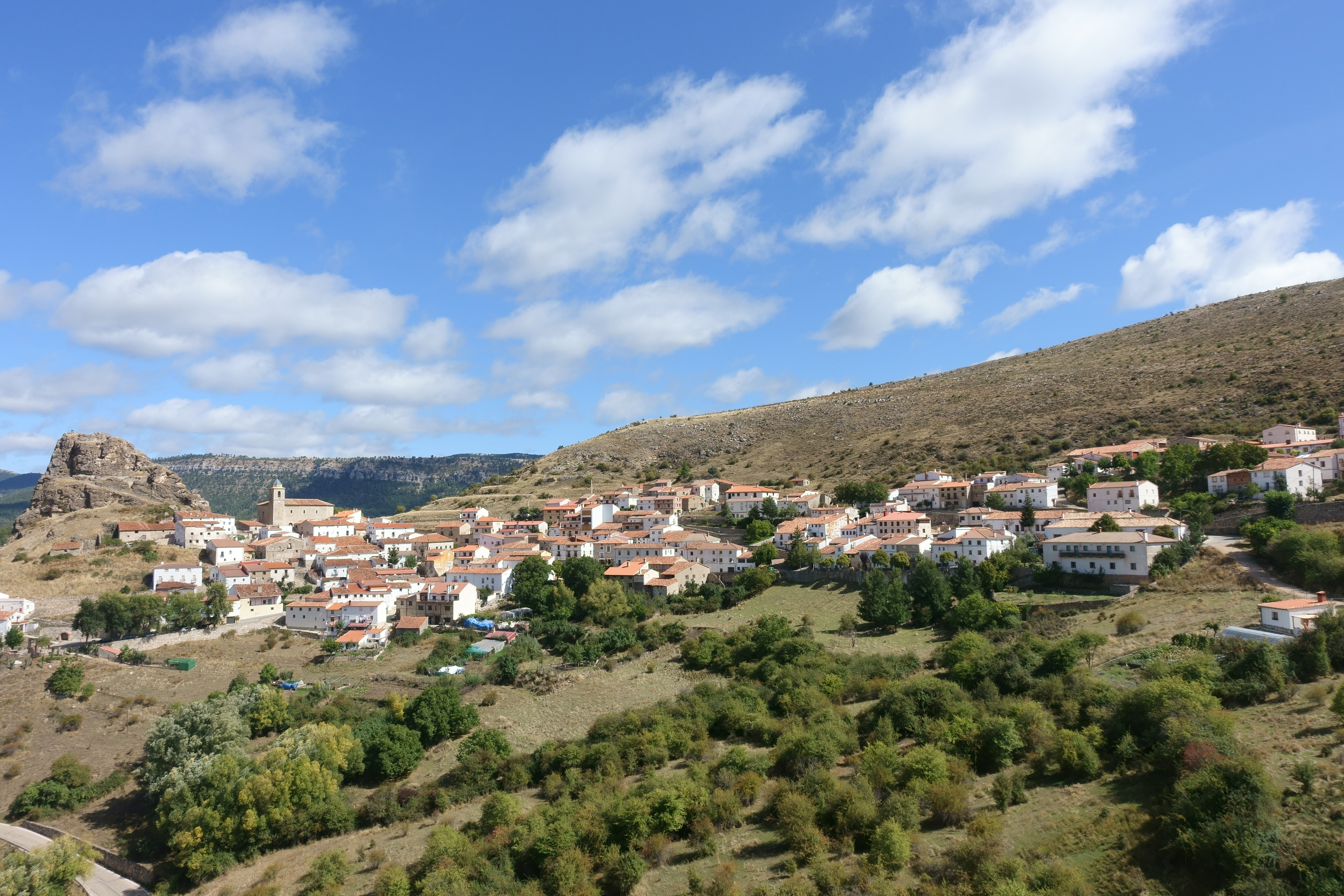
- View of the town of Huélamo

- Flag Coat of arms

- Location within Spain Location within Castilla-La Mancha
- Coordinates: 40°17′N 1°48′W
- Country: Spain
- Autonomous community: Castile-La Mancha
- Province: Cuenca

Population (2025-01-01)
  - Total: 68
- Time zone: UTC+1 (CET)
  - Summer (DST): UTC+2 (CEST)

Huélamo is a municipality in Cuenca, Castilla-La Mancha, Spain. It has a population of 124.
