= Eighty Years' War, 1576–1579 =

Third phase of the Eighty Years' War

From 8 November 1576 until 23 July 1577 Rebel-held territories in Holland, Zeeland and Guelders during 1573–1576 Union of Brussels: the 16 rebel provinces that concluded the 1576 Pacification of Ghent, and demanded the departure of all foreign Spanish troops from the Netherlands Luxemburg, the only province to remain fully loyal to the Spanish government. Most Spanish troops withdrawing from the other provinces were temporarily stationed here from late 1576 to mid-1577

The period between the Pacification of Ghent (8 November 1576), and the Unions of Arras (6 January 1579) and Utrecht (23 January 1579) constituted a crucial phase of the Eighty Years' War (c. 1568–1648) between the Spanish Empire and the rebelling United Provinces, which would become the independent Dutch Republic. Sometimes known as the "general revolt", the period marked the only time of the war where the States–General of all Seventeen Provinces of the Habsburg Netherlands, except Luxemburg, were in joint active political and military rebellion against the Spanish Imperial government through the Pacification of Ghent. The Pacification formulated several agreements amongst the rebellious provinces themselves, and laid down their demands – including the immediate withdrawal of foreign (mostly Spanish, Italian and German) troops from the Netherlands, restitution of old rights and privileges, and self-rule – to king Philip II of Spain.

From 8 November 1576 until 23 July 1577, the new Spanish Governor-General of the Netherlands John of Austria (known to history as "Don Juan") engaged in peace negotiations with the States-General. The First Union of Brussels (9 January 1577) confirmed the Pacification, adding that the States would uphold the Catholic religion in their provinces. By signing the Edict of 1577 on 12 February 1577 at Marche-en-Famenne, Don Juan nominally accepted all demands of the Pacification. Most foreign troops withdrew to the territory of Luxemburg, which had not joined the Pacification. Although a few sieges of cities with Spanish garrisons that refused to withdraw took place, these were mostly resolved quickly by paying them off; in general, the situation had potential for putting an end to the war if agreements could be reached and respected between the parties.

From 24 July 1577 until 6 January 1579, starting with the capture of the Citadel of Namur, Don Juan and his second-in-command and successor Alexander Farnese, Duke of Parma launched a military offensive against the United Provinces, while seeking to reconcile provinces that were willing to subject themselves back under the Spanish royal government under certain conditions. In response, the States-General's Second Union of Brussels (10 December 1577) showed a more fierce and determined opposition to the Spanish government, now demanding (and themselves guaranteeing) equal protection for Catholics and Protestants in all provinces of the Netherlands. William "the Silent" of Orange became the de facto political leader of the United Provinces, while Matthias of Austria was brought in to replace Don Juan as Governor-General.

The Battle of Gembloux (31 January 1578) was a devastating defeat for the rebels, however, and many began to talk about surrender. Moreover, radical Calvinists had seized power in various cities in Flanders and Brabant, most notably the so-called Calvinist Republic of Ghent, persecuting Catholics and alienating many Catholic allies which had up until that point supported the rebellion, but now became known as the Malcontents. Parma was able to successfully exert his diplomatic skills on some of these Malcontents, negotiating with several Catholic noblemen and regents in various southern provinces with promises of respecting their interests in return for abandoning the revolt. Finally, the united front of the States-General collapsed on 6 January 1579 when the County of Artois, the County of Hainaut and the city of Douai signed the Union of Arras, seeking to revert to Catholicism and the Spanish government under more moderate demands than the Pacification. On 17 May 1579, they signed a separate peace treaty with the king. In response, most of the other provinces and cities (virtually only in the Dutch-speaking parts of the Low Countries) sought to reaffirm their commitment to the Pacification, as well as the Second Union of Brussels, and forging an even closer political and military alliance by concluding the Union of Utrecht on 23 January 1579.

== Background ==
Despite his swift reconquest of most places captured by insurgents in 1572–1573, the Duke of Alba was unable to crush the Netherlandish rebellion, which had turned into a war of attrition against the remaining rebel pockets in Holland and Zeeland by mid-1573. Following the seven-month-long Siege of Haarlem, Alba requested and was granted to be relieved in December 1573. In his stead, Philip II appointed Luis de Requesens as Governor-General, and a new policy of moderation was attempted. However, Requesens did not manage to broker a policy acceptable to both the Spanish king and the States of Holland and Zeeland. Following the Spanish state's bankruptcy on 1 September 1575 and the death of Requesens on 5 March 1576, the Spanish mercenary armies were left without pay and leadership, leading to numerous mutinies. The resulting Spanish Fury, a series of sackings of towns by pillaging and looting unpaid mutinous Spanish troops, reached alarming proportions in the course of 1576.

== Mutinies and convention of the States-General (March–November 1576) ==
In accordance to protocol, the governance of the loyal provinces was temporarily transferred to the Council of State upon Requesens' death while awaiting the appointment of a new governor-general. The Council was immediately put under pressure by the States of Brabant – who had convened on their own initiative without permission – repeating their demands from the failed 1575 Breda peace talks: to send away the foreign troops, to appoint Netherlandish officials rather than foreign ones, and to convoke the States-General, who should not just have advisory competence but co-decision power. The Council of State was thus put in an awkward position, particularly when king Philip informed the Council on 12 June 1576 that he would neither approve of the States-General convening, nor of further peace negotiations with Holland and Zeeland.

Meanwhile in March and April 1576, some 1,300 Habsburg light cavalrymen, some of whom had not received payment in six years, moved to Flanders and Brabant and started pillaging. When the Siege of Zierikzee ended with a royalist victory on 30 June 1576, government forces also mutinied. 5,300 Spanish mutineers from Zierikzee marched on Flanders, on the way ravaging, looting and extorting the countryside, committing the Sack of Aalst (25 July 1576), and using Aalst as a base of operations for further plundering, even threatening Brussels. The loyal provinces had reluctantly backed the royal government against the Rebellion so far, but now a loyal city had been sacked. Following pressure of the provincial States, the Council declared the mutineers enemies of the state, and authorised the States of Brabant to raise troops to defend against both the mutineers and the troops of William of Orange. Indeed, the States of Brabant raised their own troops to protect Brussels. The Flemish States soon followed their example.

Many members of the loyal opposition were not satisfied with the Council of State's response, however, as it still refused to convene the States-General and hold peace talks with the rebels. On 4 September 1576, Brabantian soldiers commanded by the lord of Heeze arrested the members of the Council of State in Brussels. It is unknown who was behind this coup; although William of Orange was Heeze's godfather, it could also have been Philippe III de Croÿ, Duke of Aarschot, who was himself a Council member, and leader of the Catholic royalist moderates who sought peace with William. The next day, the pro-Spanish government was deposed, and on 6 September the States of Brabant sent out invitations to the provinces for convening the States-General. In doing so, they violated royal prerogative to convene the States-General and raise armies. Initially, only Flanders and Hainaut would respond to the Brabantian invitation. In order to increase their sense of legitimacy, they freed a few Council members such as the aging Viglius to write and send new invitations.

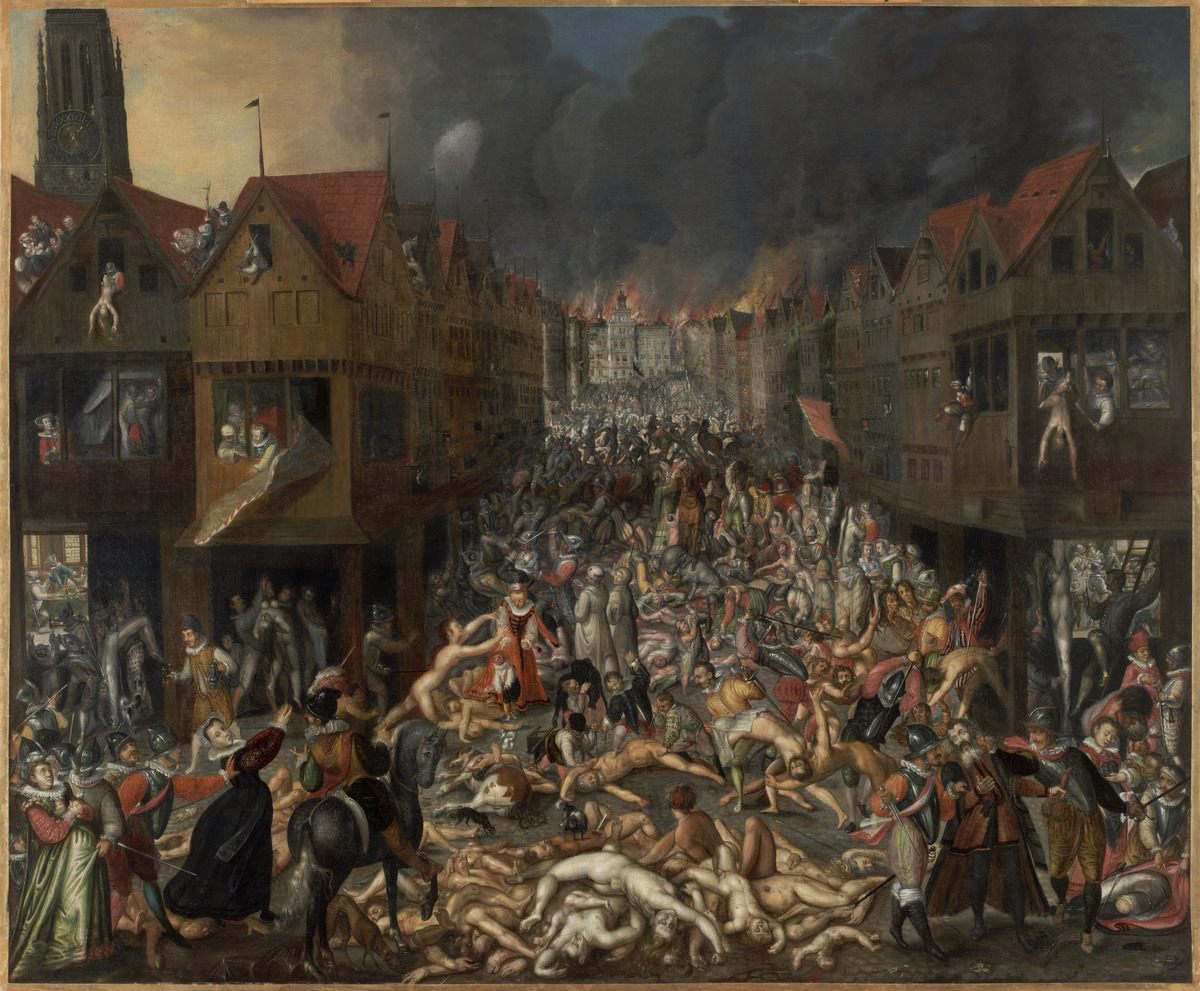
Anonymous contemporary depiction of the "Spanish Fury" at Antwerp (Museum aan de Stroom)

Troops recently raised by the Brabantian States were defeated by a mutinous Spanish force in the Battle of Vissenaken (14 September 1576). To prevent further atrocities in their province, the States of Flanders decided on the Siege of the Spanjaardenkasteel (15 September – 11 November 1576), a castle in Ghent with a Spanish garrison threatening munity. However, they struggled mounting the assault, and resolved to request assistance from William of Orange, who sent Hollandic troops to Ghent in late September. The meeting of the States-General started on 25 September 1576, initially only attended by representatives of Brabant, Flanders and Hainaut. The States-General established a Council of War as the new supreme body of the Habsburg Netherlandish army, appointed Aarschot the new commander-in-chief, Philip de Lalaing, 3rd Count of Lalaing (stadtholder of Hainaut) as lieutenant-general, and Antoine de Goignies as field marshal (marischal du camp). In October and November 1576, other noblemen were appointed to high military offices.

In the meantime, the situation caused by the large-scale mutinies had thoroughly disrupted everyday life in Flanders and Brabant, where rural inhabitants armed themselves against the mutineers (sometimes selling their cattle to do so), or fled to the safety of the walled cities. Infectious diseases also spread. Civilians attempted to limit the mutineers' movements by blocking roads, breaking down bridges and sinking ships, thereby disrupting traffic, including postal communication that was important for coordinating joint actions. The Spanish Fury of Maastricht (20 October 1576) saw even more Spanish mutineers plunder a city, and kill many self-defending civilians.

Delegations of representatives from southern provinces such as Artois, Walloon Flanders and Namur (but neither Luxemburg nor Limburg), as well as Utrecht, joined the States-General meeting in October. On William's suggestion that Brussels was too unsafe, the States-General convened in Ghent. Representatives from Holland and Zeeland later also arrived in Ghent, where negotiations began on 19 October. On 3 November 1576, the various representatives of the provinces reached an agreement on political issues at the States-General in Ghent, and were preparing negotiations on religious matters. On 4 November 1576, the Spanish Fury culminated in the Sack of Antwerp; Spanish mutineers went on a murderous and pillaging rampage through the city that had up to that point been the most prosperous of the Low Countries. Some 8,000 lives were lost, often murdered in horrendous manners, while about 600 houses were destroyed by fire. The mutineers stole about 1.5 million guilders and other valuables in loot, which took them three weeks to carry away from Antwerp.

== Pacification of Ghent ==
Shocked by the atrocities in Antwerp and elsewhere, the loyal provinces sought contact with the rebels. Philippe de Croÿ, Duke of Aarschot, took over government and allowed the States-General to start peace negotiations with the States of Holland and Zeeland in the city of Ghent. All agreed that the Spanish troops should be withdrawn, and they pledged to fight together against mutinous Spanish forces that might cause further harm and damage to the civilian population. There was also agreement on the suspension of the placards against heresy and freedom of conscience. For the mostly Catholic provinces, the destruction by mutinous foreign troops was the principal reason to join in an open revolt, but formally the provinces still remained loyal to the sovereign Philip II. The resulting Pacification of Ghent was signed 8 November 1576, mere days after the Sack of Antwerp. The Pacification did not reach agreement on religion, but merely stated that a definitive policy was to be adopted later. This vagueness remained one of the principal sources of contention throughout the short period in which the 16 provinces were cooperating in their opposition to the royal government (see #Growing discord amongst the Provinces).

== Attempts at reconciliation (November 1576 – July 1577) ==
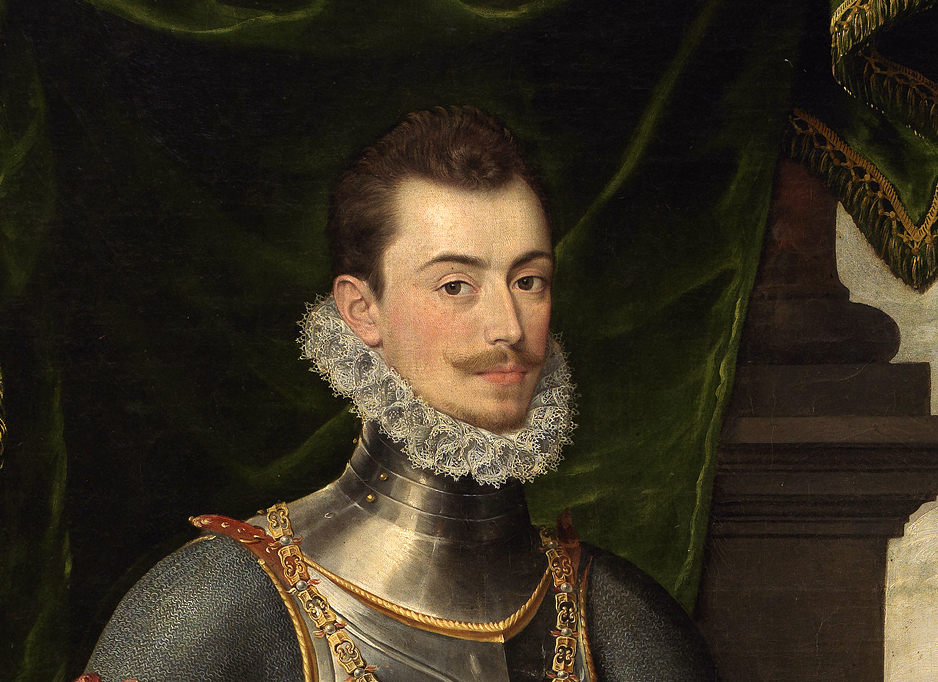
Don Juan of Austria, famous for his victory at Lepanto, first sought to appease the rebels, but resorted to military force in July 1577

On November 3, Juan de Austria, the subsequent regent, arrived far too late to change the course of the events. On February 12, 1577, the States-General persuaded Juan de Austria to consent to the Pacification of Ghent through the Perpetual Edict. The majority of Spanish soldiers and garrisons were moved over several months from the 16 provinces to Luxemburg, the only one that had continued to be completely devoted to the Spanish crown. Nonetheless, there were still some ongoing religious conflicts inside the United Provinces. The forces of the United States laid siege to certain garrisons that refused to leave, as in the case of the Vredenburg castle siege in Utrecht from December 1576–February 1577.

== Resumption of hostilities ==
=== Don Juan's capture of Namur and Parma's offensive (July 1577–1578) ===
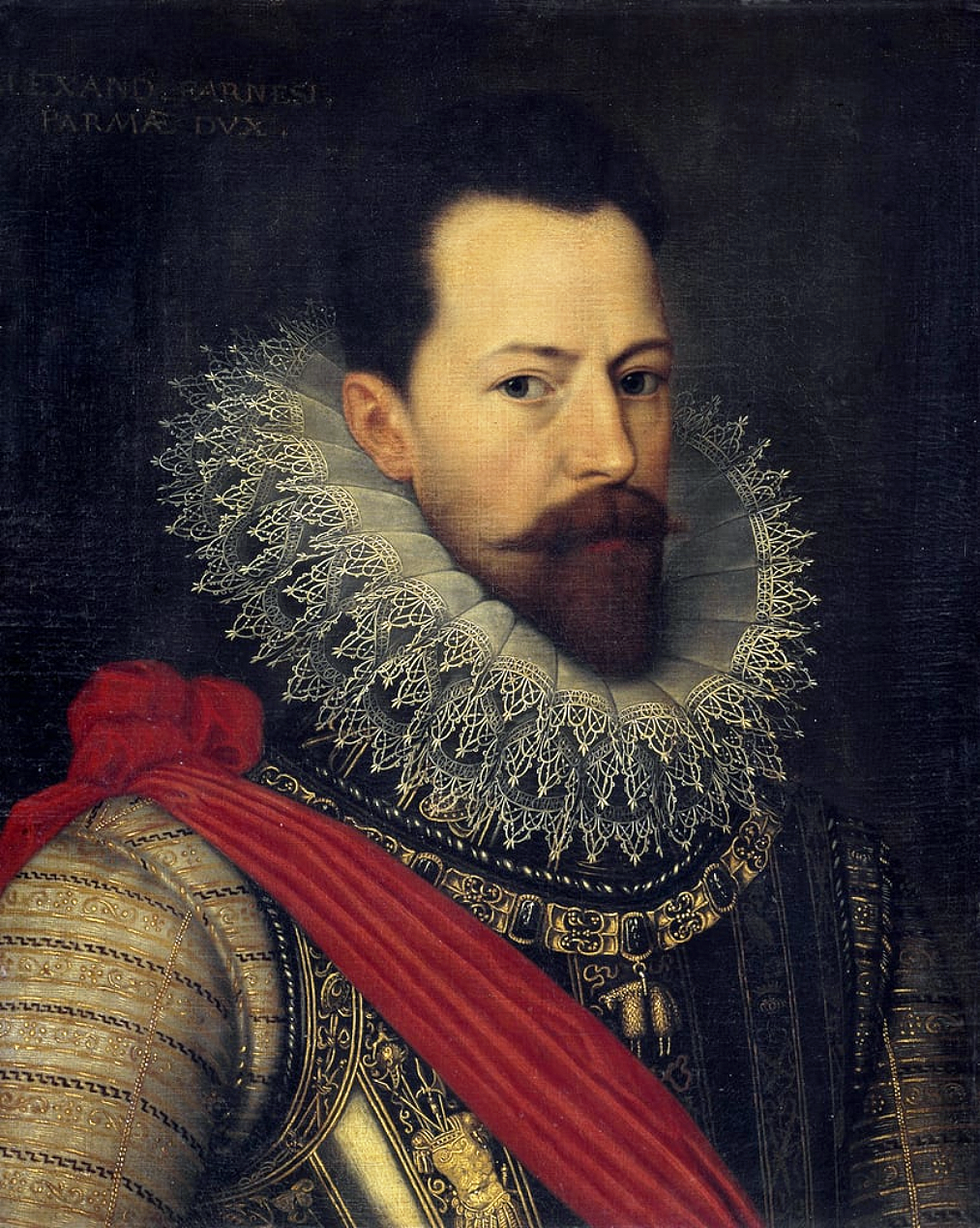
Don Alexander Farnese, Duke of Parma, commander of the Spanish Army of Flanders 1578–1592

Don Juan broke with the States-General in July, and seized the citadel of Namur with his army on 24 July 1577. The States-General regarded this as a violation of the Perpetual Edict, and hardened their opposition against Don Juan. Military preparations were made for an expected renewal of hostilities on the battlefield. The States-General of all provinces rallied behind William of Orange as their unofficial leader, who managed to forge a tentative understanding between Catholics and Protestants at a critical time of upheaval. Orange made his triumphal entries into Antwerp and on 22 September 1577 into Brussels, where he was welcomed as if he were a king, reaching the height of his power. Amongst the reception committee was even Aarschot, who had been Orange's rival before Alba's 1567 arrival, and the de facto leader of his majesty's loyal opposition in the years thereafter, but now embraced Orange as his ally, as their interests now firmly coincided. While Orange was awarded the title of ruwaard ("guardian") of Brabant by the States, Aarschot was appointed stadtholder of Flanders, and they agreed to bring in Matthias of Austria to replace Don Juan as Governor-General.

Philip's financial difficulties were straightened out by the end of 1577. (Note: The system of "contributions" Requesens adopted in 1574 outside the areas where regular taxes could be collected, helped to augment revenue from the Netherlands (though it did not help avert the mutiny of 1576). Parma later "improved" on this system of forced contributions by regularizing the arbitrary exactions of the Spanish troops in the form of brandschattingen, to a system of formalized extortions, in which communities paid "protection money" to the Spanish "superintendent of contributions" to avoid being sacked.) This enabled him to send a new Spanish army from Italy, under the command of Alexander Farnese, Duke of Parma.

Spain, aided by shipments of bullion from the New World, was able to send a new army under Parma. These troops arrived in January 1578, and were soon venturing into the territory of the States-General. Parma routed the States-General's troops in the Battle of Gembloux on 31 January, allowing royalist forces to advance to Leuven. The five-day Siege of Zichem (February 1578), the five-day Siege of Nivelles (March 1578) followed by the capture of Diest, Zoutleeuw, Nivelles, Chimay, Herve, Limbourg, Dalhem, and Argenteau resulted in more government victories close to the rebel capital of Brussels.

New troops raised by the States General with support of Elizabeth I of England defeated the Spanish armies at the Battle of Rijmenam on 31 July 1578. The States-General were not able to exploit their advantage. Parma became the new governor general after the death of Juan de Austria (1 October 1578).

=== Expulsion of royalist garrisons in northern Brabant and Overijssel (1577–1578) ===
From 24 July 1577 until the end of 1578. Union of Brussels: territories controlled by the moderate rebel States-General Cities captured by moderate rebels. Cities seized by radical Calvinists in 1577–8. The most prominent of these – Ghent, Antwerp and Brussels – were known as 'Calvinist republics'. Spanish-controlled territory Rebel territories reconquered by Don Juan

In northern Brabant, the Siege of Breda (1577) (August–October 1577) forced the Spanish garrison to withdraw. The Capture of Steenbergen followed on 14 August, the Capture of Bergen op Zoom on 13 September. However, a rebel Attack on Amsterdam (1577) (23 November) failed, and the city remained pro-Spanish for the time being.

In the east, the Catholic stadtholder of Groningen, Friesland, Drenthe and Overijssel, George de Lalaing, Count of Rennenberg, dutifully besieged and conquered the cities of Kampen (May–July 1578) and Deventer (August–November 1578), where garrisons of German mercenaries in Spanish service (in Kampen two companies under Von Polweiler; in Deventer 600 men) had refused to retreat on the orders of the States-General and Don Juan, until they were given adequate payment and evacuated both cities.

=== Calvinist revolution in Flanders and southern Brabant (from October 1577) ===
Meanwhile, radical Calvinists led by Jan van Hembyse and François van Ryhove had seized power in Ghent on 28 October 1577, turning the city into the Calvinist Republic of Ghent. The recently appointed Flemish stadtholder Aarschot, the grand bailiff of Ghent, and the bishops of Bruges and Ypres were captured and imprisoned. After the example of Brussels (where Olivier van den Tympel had been appointed military governor on 23 September 1577), a Committee of XVIII, with Hembyze as the first schepen, was appointed to govern city and county affairs. The new regime established a Protestant theocracy that vehemently persecuted Catholic clergy. It was also militarily expansionist, seizing control of other cities in the County of Flanders, where similar Calvinist committees were set up. Hembyze was supported by Calvinist preachers such as Pieter Datheen and Herman Moded in his anti-Catholic policies. Ryhove armed civilians, and enlisted the service of foreign (English and Scottish) mercenaries, which enabled the Ghent Republic to control large parts of the County of Flanders. By July 1578, the Calvinist Republic had captured Kortrijk, Menen, Ypres, Ronse and Bruges, and established a Committee of XVIII in each of them. Furthermore, the towns of Oudenaarde, Axel, Hulst, Sint-Niklaas, Dunkirk, Sint-Winoksbergen, Veurne, and others were occupied by the Calvinists, while Deinze and Dendermonde voluntarily joined the Ghent movement. In 1579, Wetteren was plundered. Every town that experienced a revolution would witness iconoclastic acts and violence against Catholic clerics. The Ghent radicals sought to take a leading role in the anti-Spanish rebellion, which they saw as a religious war against the Popish Catholic heresy. This brought them in conflict with the moderate William of Orange, whose policy was to reconcile and unite Catholics and Protestants in their joint grievances against the Spanish government, seeing freedom of conscience for everyone and not necessarily striving yet for independence.

=== Holland's defensive preparations and Amsterdam's Alteratie (1576–1578) ===
Holland had started the construction of a ring defence of trace-italienne type fortresses to stop Spanish armies roaming around in their lands. Among the new fortresses were Geertruidenberg, Zevenbergschen Hoek (both across the Hollands Diep in Brabant, as the north bank of that estuary was sparsely populated), Gorinchem, Loevestein castle and Woudrichem (at important confluences of rivers), Muiden and Naarden (on the eastern approaches of Amsterdam).

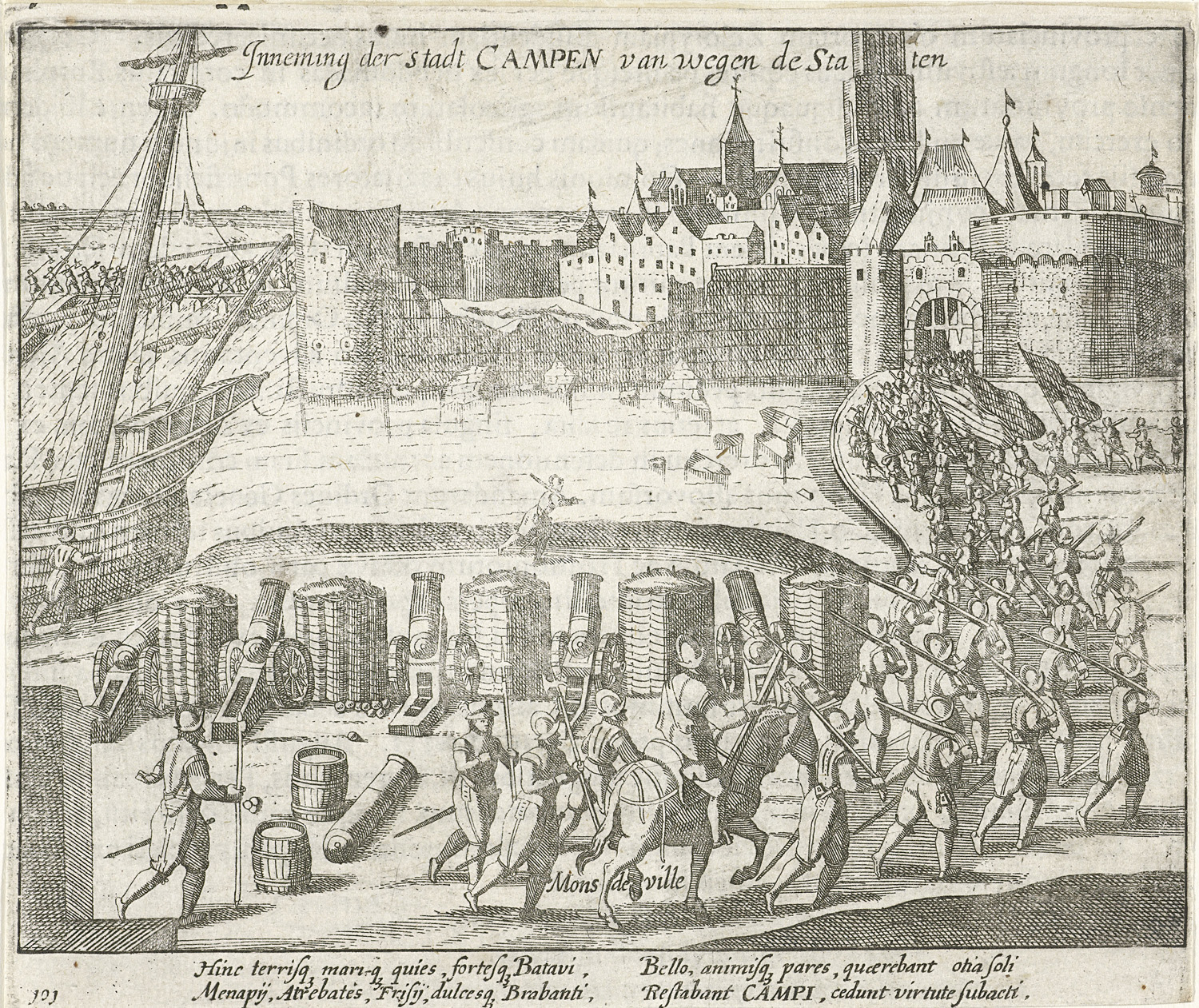
Siege of Kampen in 1578

The remaining royalist cities in Holland were won over to the rebel cause. Haarlem, Weesp and Muiden swore allegiance to Orange as stadtholder for the States-General on 22 January 1577. Amsterdam proved more difficult, as the city government was more defiantly royalist. Additionally, it had cause for complaint as the Sea-Beggar navy continued to informally blockade Amsterdam's trade in contravention of the Pacification. When help from Don Juan proved infeasible, Amsterdam sued for an arrangement in September 1577. The States of Holland, however, preferred to subdue the city by force, instead of engaging in negotiations (despite Orange's imprecations). Rebel troops started to invest Amsterdam, but thanks to mediation by the States of Utrecht (a province that had been consistently on the royalist side during the Rebellion) a "Satisfaction" was agreed on 8 February 1578. Calvinist exiles were to be allowed to return, but they would not be free to worship according to their preference; only the Catholic religion would be practiced. This was the mirror image of conditions elsewhere in Holland. The old militias would be re-formed, and Amsterdam would not be liable for debts of the States contracted during the Rebellion. However, after the exiles returned, they staged a bloodless coup on 24 May 1578, ousting the city government and expelling its members from the city. This so-called "Alteratie" brought Amsterdam again fully into the fold of the northern Netherlandish province, and eliminated the strategically dangerous chink it had formed in its armour.

Alliances between Holland, Utrecht and Gelderland were created to increase border defence. This left many cities in Holland over-garrisoned, and companies of mercenaries were given in the service of the States-General. This allowed for the establishment of garrisons in the Southern provinces (including in Mechelen, Antwerp, Brussels and Maastricht) and fighting Hierges from Utrecht; additionally, it convinced the German soldiers of Nicholas von Polweiler to surrender Kampen (20 July 1578) and Deventer (18 November 1578) in Overijssel. At the same time, 12 companies of Hollandic soldiers were unsuccessful in their siege of Roermond in Upper Guelders in 1577–1578; the royal garrison sallied forth and drove off the besiegers in January 1578.

== Growing discord amongst the provinces ==
Though at first the interests of Holland and the States-General in this sense converged, they started to diverge as Parma made steady gains in the South. For William of Orange and the States-General the theater of Brabant was pre-eminent in the war, but by 1579 Holland had a greater interest in using its troops to protect its allies in the eastern provinces. The same went for its money, which may have been even more important. With Holland being more and more reluctant to help finance the war for the States-General, the military situation got more and more dire for the latter, which allowed Parma to make threatening gains in the direction of areas of strategic interest for Holland in the east etc.; a vicious spiral in other words. If the Dutch Regenten had seen the strategic implications of Parma's advances, like William did, things might have turned out differently, but they did not. Instead they preferred to formalize a defensive union with their by now generally friendly eastern and northern neighbors. The States of Holland became increasingly focused on the interest of the Northern provinces, and in spite of William's warnings, Holland formalised the defensive Union of Utrecht with its eastern and northern neighbours, on 23 January. (Note: The treaty is often referred to as the "constitution" of the Dutch Republic, though this is only partially true. This document in the main consisted of the constitutional framework that had organically grown in the Burgundian and Habsburg Netherlands in the previous decades, its structure simply retained by the Republic. However, the articles of the treaty provided additional building blocks for the constitution by providing an explicit framework for the budding Confederation. It was signed in the city of Utrecht by the representatives of Holland, Zeeland, Utrecht, the Ommelanden around Groningen city, and the stadtholder of Gelderland, William's brother Jan, who presumed to sign for the divided States of Gelderland. Ironically, Jan van Nassau was reluctantly accepted by the bloc hostile to William and Holland in the Gelderland States, who mistook him for a Lutheran moderate, and as such a bulwark against Calvinist encroachments.)

== Unions of Arras and Utrecht (January 1579) ==
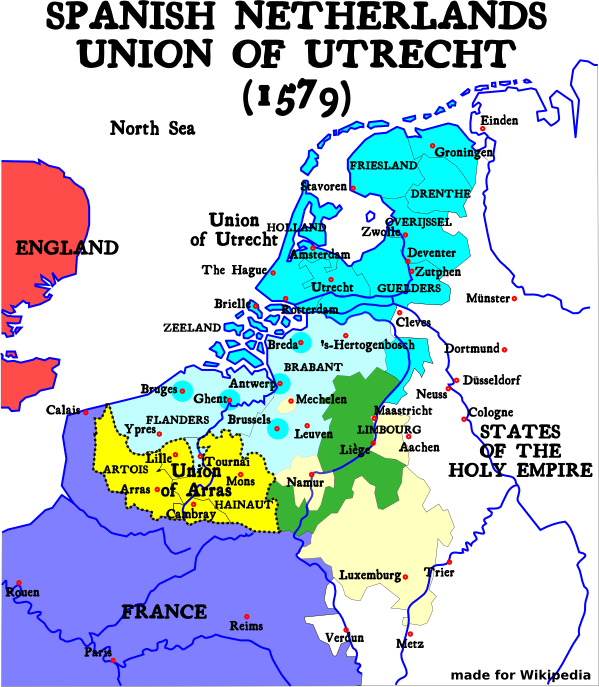
The Netherlands in 1579, indicating the Unions of Utrecht (blue) and Atrecht (yellow)

On 6 January 1579, prompted by the new Spanish governor Farnese, and upset by aggressive Calvinism, the Catholic nobility of the counties of Artois and Hainaut, and of the city of Douai, left the alliance agreed upon by the Pacification of Ghent and signed the Union of Arras (Atrecht), expressing their loyalty to the Spanish king. This meant an early end to the goal of united opposition to the presence of foreign troops in the Netherlands, abuse of royal power and religious intolerance, agreed upon less than three years prior.

In response to the Union of Arras, William united the provinces of Holland, Zeeland, Utrecht, Guelders, and Groningen in the Union of Utrecht on 23 January; Brabant and Flanders joined a month later, in February. Effectively, the seventeen provinces were now divided into a southern group loyal to the Spanish king and a rebellious northern group. Meanwhile, Parma laid siege to Maastricht on 12 March 1579; his troops entered the city on 29 June. Parma and his deputies were unable to prevent a massacre of the garrison or Maastricht's civilians.

== Bibliography ==
- Groenveld, Simon (2009). Unie - Bestand - Vrede. Drie fundamentele wetten van de Republiek der Verenigde Nederlanden. Hilversum: Uitgeverij Verloren. p. 200. ISBN 9789087041274. (in cooperation with H.L.Ph. Leeuwenberg and H.B. van der Weel)
- Groenveld, Simon; Leeuwenberg, Huib (2020). De Tachtigjarige Oorlog. Opstand en consolidatie in de Nederlanden (ca. 1560–1650). Derde editie (in Dutch). Zutphen: Walburg Pers. p. 750. ISBN 9789462495661. (e-book; original publication 2008; in cooperation with M. Mout and W. Zappey)
- Israel, Jonathan (1995). The Dutch Republic: Its Rise, Greatness, and Fall 1477–1806. Oxford: Clarendon Press. ISBN 0-19-873072-1.
- Kamen, Henry (2005). Spain, 1469–1714: a society of conflict (3rd ed.). Harlow, United Kingdom: Pearson Education. ISBN 0-582-78464-6.
- Koenigsberger, Helmut G. (2007). Monarchies, States Generals and Parliaments. The Netherlands in the fifteenth and sixteenth centuries. Cambridge University Press. ISBN 978-0-521-04437-0. [2001] paperback
- Marek y Villarino de Brugge, André (2020a). Alessandro Farnese: Prince of Parma: Governor-General of the Netherlands (1545–1592): v. I. Los Angeles: MJV Enterprises ltd. inc. ISBN 979-8687255998.
- Marek y Villarino de Brugge, André (2020b). Alessandro Farnese: Prince of Parma: Governor-General of the Netherlands (1545-1592): v. II. Los Angeles: MJV Enterprises, ltd., inc. ISBN 979-8687563130.
- van der Lem, Anton (1995). "Het verhaal van de Opstand. Hoofdstuk 5: De scheiding in de Nederlanden". De Opstand in de Nederlanden (1555–1648) (in Dutch). Uitgeverij Kosmos / Leiden University. Archived from the original on 18 September 2011.
- Parker, Geoffrey (2004). The Army of Flanders and the Spanish Road 1567–1659. Second edition. Cambridge University Press. ISBN 978-0-521-54392-7. paperback
- Swart, Erik (2006). Krijgsvolk. Militaire professionalisering en het ontstaan van het Staatse leger, 1568–1590 (PDF) (in Dutch). Amsterdam: Amsterdam University Press. p. 278. ISBN 978-90-5356-876-7. (Dissertation)
- Tracy, J.D. (2008). The Founding of the Dutch Republic: War, Finance, and Politics in Holland 1572–1588. Oxford University Press. ISBN 978-0-19-920911-8.
