= Siege of Ghent (1583–1584) =

1583–1584 siege

- Part of the Eighty Years' War
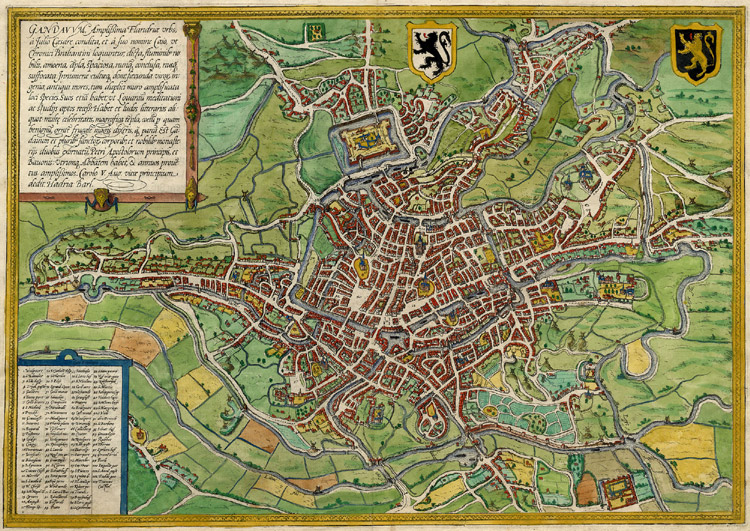
- Ghent in 1576. Braun & Hogenberg.
| Date | October 1583 – 17 September 1584 |
| Location | Ghent, Flanders, Netherlands |
| Result | Spanish victory |

Belligerents
| Calvinist Republic of Ghent | Spanish army Malcontents |

Commanders and leaders
| Jan van Hembyze; Pieter Datheen | Alexander Farnese, Duke of Parma |

The siege of Ghent during the Eighty Years' War by Spanish general Alexander Farnese, Prince of Parma, lasted from October 1583 to 17 September 1584. It was the end phase of the so-called Calvinist Republic of Ghent, which had controlled most of the County of Flanders since radical Protestants seized power on 28 October 1577, claiming a leading role for the city of Ghent in the struggle against the Spanish royal forces and Malcontent Catholics.

== Background ==
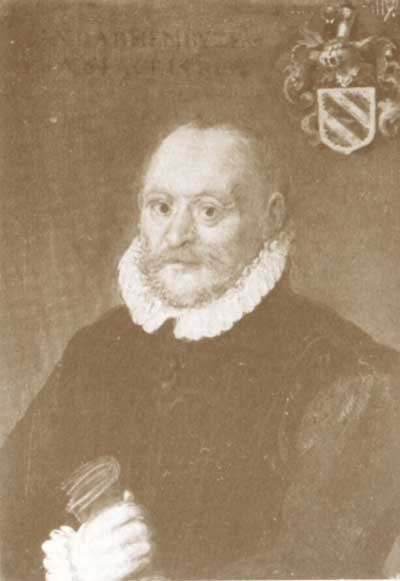
Hembyze.

During its existence, the Calvinist Republic of Ghent (1577–1584) was riddled with internal strife between the factions surrounding the intolerant radical Calvinist Jan van Hembyze and the more moderate, Orangist (that is, sympathising with William the Silent, Prince of Orange) François van der Kethulle, lord of Ryhove, while Spanish and Malcontent troops made increasing territorial gains from 1578 onward. In 1579, Hembyze first banned Ryhove, then Ryhove had Hembyze removed from the city with William’s help. Ryhove continued William’s moderate policy, and tried to cooperate as much as possible with the Calvinist Republic of Antwerp (1577–1585) and the States of Brabant. However, the two lost all their authority in Ghent when they persisted in trying to reconcile with Francis, Duke of Anjou, after the latter's violent "French Fury" coup attempt in January 1583. Hembyze was recalled to Ghent on 14 August 1583, where he arrived on 24 October, establishing a dictatorship. Ryhove was expelled once again, and he installed himself in Dendermonde, where he blocked the supplies from Antwerp to Ghent to undermine Hembyze's regime.

== Course ==
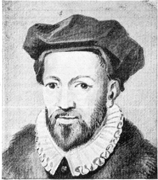
Datheen.

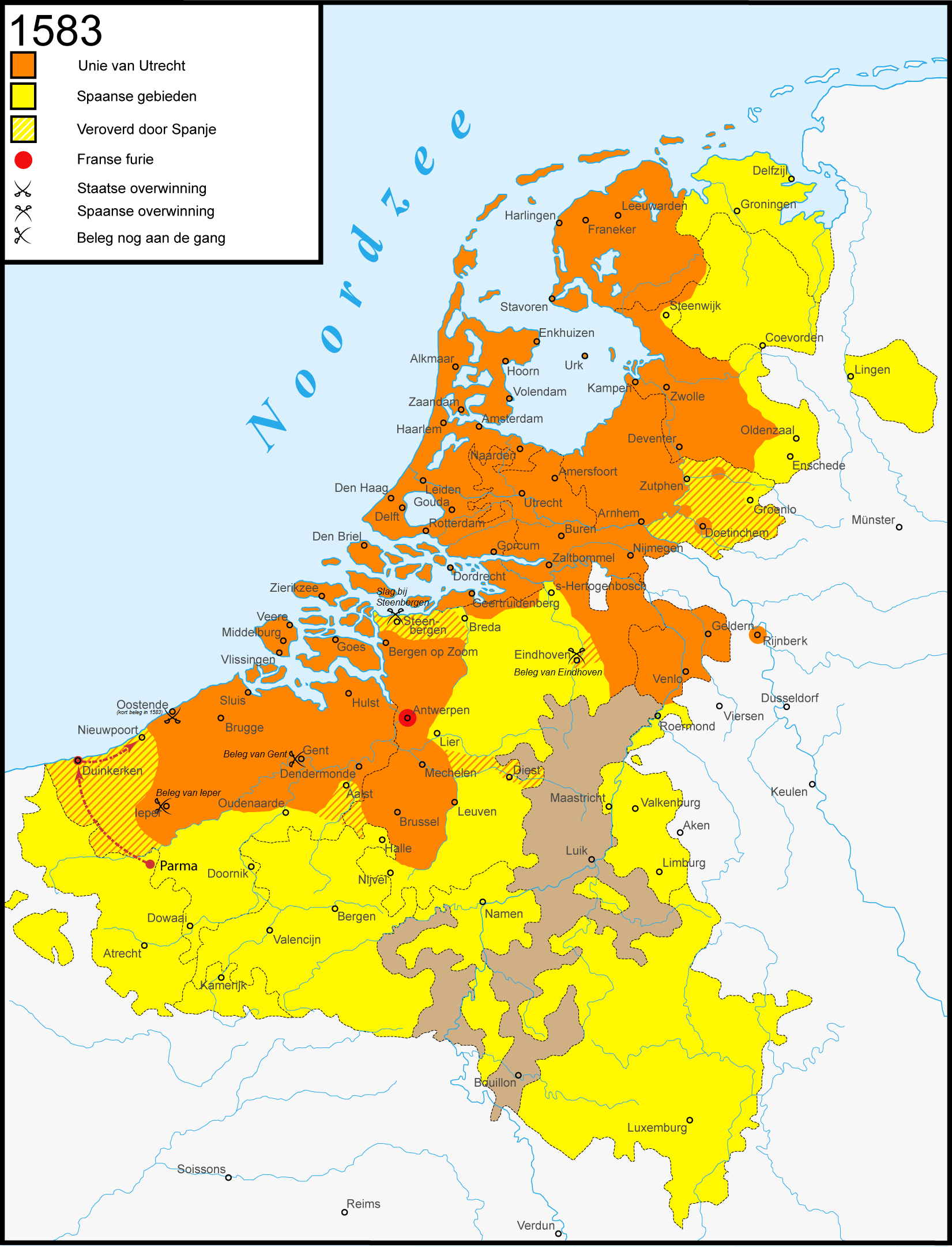
War situation in 1583, with territory controlled by the rebels in orange.

Hembyze failed to restore unity when he returned to Ghent. Orangists challenged his rule in the city, Antwerp, the States of Brabant, and the States General increasingly mistrusted the intolerant Ghent regime, while reconciliation with Ryhove, and therefore supplies to the city, were never realised. While the royal governor-general and commander-in-chief Alexander Farnese further encircled Ghent, the fall of the Calvinist republic became inevitable. The Spanish conquered Sas van Gent in October and the Waasland in November. On 3 November, Parma bribed the starving English garrison (in Dutch rebel service) of Aalst into surrendering the city in exchange for food and overdue troop payments. After a siege, Ypres fell on 7 April 1584, followed by Bruges and the Brugse Vrije on 20 May 1584 by a treaty negotiated with Parma. Hembyze and Pieter Datheen were forced into commencing secret negotiations with Parma on 5 March, but they were exposed. Hembyze was arrested on 23 March, and beheaded on 4 August on Saint Pharaildis Square, while Datheen was imprisoned. Meanwhile, William of Orange was assassinated on 10 July 1584 in Delft, leaving the Dutch Revolt without both its radical and its moderate leaders. On 17 August 1584, Dendermonde was forced to surrender, and Ryhove fled to England. On 17 September 1584, Ghent surrendered to the Spanish royal troops.

== Aftermath ==
After Ghent was taken, Frédéric Perrenot de Champagney was released from prison (where he had been since 1578), and appointed governor of the city. The fall of Ghent sealed the fate of the Calvinist Republic of Ghent, and put an end there the city’s leading role in the revolt, which now shifted to Antwerp and later, to the County of Holland. Catholicism was restored as the official religion, while about 15,000 inhabitants abandoned the city, including thousands of Calvinists who primarily migrated to Holland. By 1600, the population of Ghent had shrunk from 50,000 (before the revolt) to 31,000 inhabitants. With the except of Ostend, the revolt was over in Flanders, and by the time Maurice of Nassau conducted his campaign towards Dunkirk, leading to the Battle of Nieuwpoort (1600), the Flemish populace did not support him. At the conclusion of the Siege of Ostend in 1604, the emerging Dutch Republic lost its last major Flemish city. Only a small northern coastal strip would eventually remain in Dutch possession when the Peace of Münster was concluded in 1648; this region was known as Staats-Vlaanderen, which largely corresponds to modern Zeelandic Flanders (Zeeuws-Vlaanderen), the only part of the former County of Flanders that still has a substantial Protestant population.

== Sources ==
- B. Vander Schelden, De Gentse stadsmagistraat tijdens de calvinistische Republiek (1577-1584) (2010). Ghent University. Retrieved 12 November 2019.
- Marcel Tettero, Jan van Hembyze is een extremistische calvinist uit Gent. Retrieved 12 November 2019.
