= Jan van Hembyse =

Flemish politician

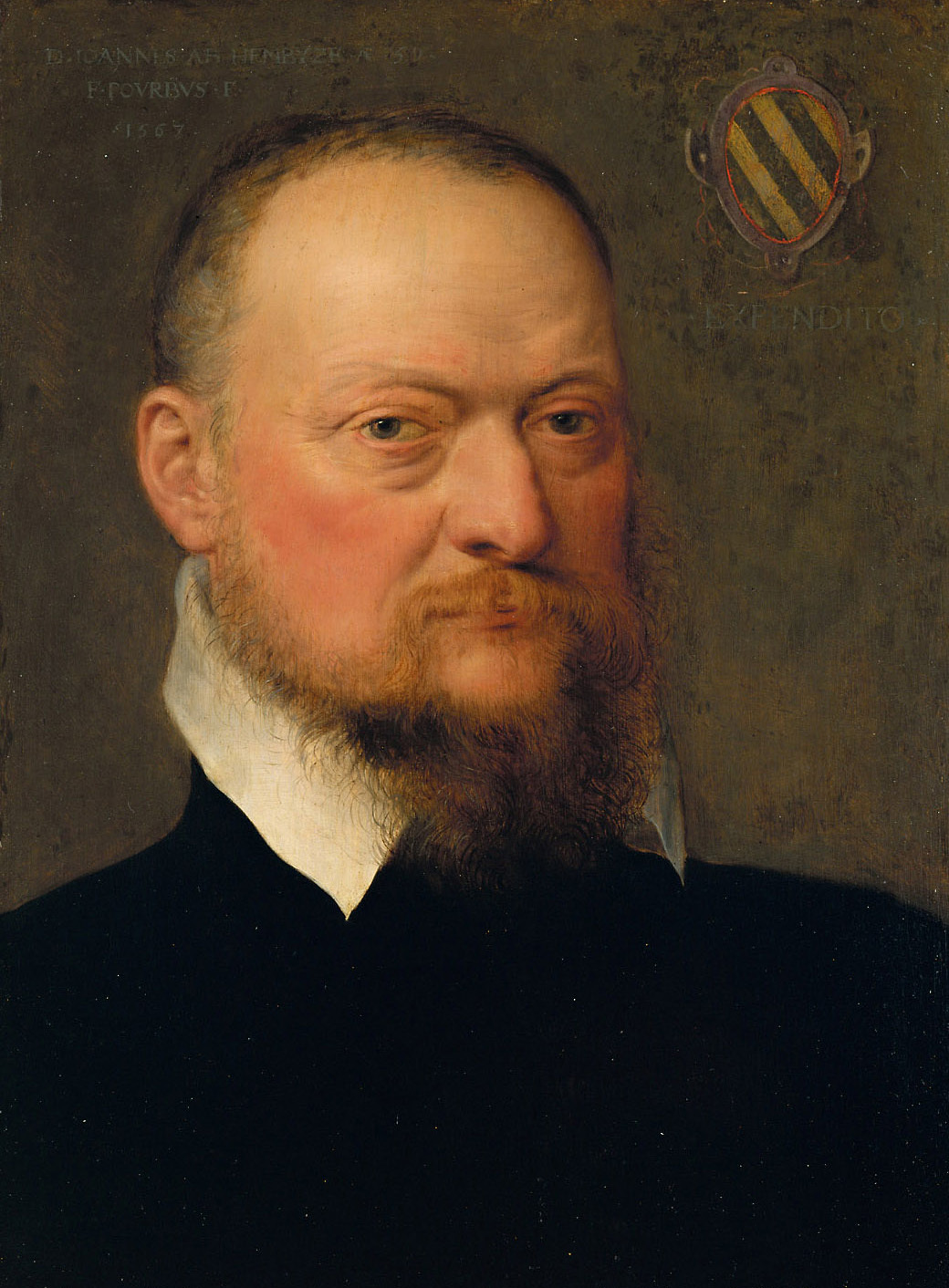
- Jan van Hembyse, by Frans Pourbus the Elder
- Born: 9 July 1513; Ghent
- Died: 8 August 1584 (aged 71); Ghent
- Occupation: Politician
- Political party: Radical Calvinist
- Spouse: Johanna van Waerhem
- Parent(s): Willem van Hembyse, Willemine Triest

Jan van Hembyse or Hembyze (Ghent, 9 July 1513 – Ghent, 8 August 1584) was a Flemish politician and popular leader, with a demagogic tendency, who together with François van Ryhove brought about the Calvinist Republic of Ghent and for two periods (1577-1578 and 1583-1584) led that regime in the early stage of the Dutch Revolt and the Eighty Years' War as it unfolded in the County of Flanders.

== Personal life ==
Jan was the son of Willem van Hembyse, a former schepen of Ghent, and Willemine Triest. He married Johanna van Waerhem on 23 April 1539. (Note: The marriage contract was signed on 22 February 1538, and Guillaume was born on 17 February 1539; Cf. Blommaert, pp. 54, 56) They had a son (Guillaume) and a daughter (Catherina).

== Career ==
Hembyse followed his father in Ghent politics.

After the States General of the Netherlands in defiance of king Philip in 1576 concluded the Pacification of Ghent with the Dutch rebels under the Prince of Orange, the then royal stadtholder of Flanders supported an insurrection of the Ghent citizens, led by Hembyse and Ryhove, resulting in a siege of the citadel of Ghent (the Spanjaardenkasteel), which resulted in the expulsion of the Spanish garrison. However, when the stadtholder chose the side of the new royal governor-general of the Netherlands, John of Austria, he was replaced by the States General by Philippe III de Croÿ, duke of Aarschot, who was mistrusted by Calvinists like Hembyse (and also by the Prince of Orange). Hembyse and Ryhove conspired with Orange to stage a coup d'état on 28 October 1577 in which Aarschot and a number of other provincial notables were arrested. On 1 November 1577 a revolutionary council was elected (the so-called Achttienmannen, after the 18 members of the council) which took over the government of Ghent. Hembyse was made First Schepen of Ghent. This was the beginning of what became known as the Calvinist Republic of Ghent.

It was the start of a phase in which the radical Calvinists in Ghent in defiance of the provisions about the freedom of religion afforded to the Calvinist and Roman Catholic religions in the Pacification of Ghent, started to encroach on the rights of the Catholics, and to actually persecute those. In this context the Calvinist mob, incited by Calvinist preachers like Petrus Dathenus, and by Hembyze, in May 1578 staged an Iconoclastic Fury against the property of the Catholic Church in the city. Also, monks of a local monastery were accused of practicing sodomy and after a show trial burnt at the stake. This caused much resistance by the defenders of the Catholic cause. When Hembyse armed the citizens of Ghent and also hired Scottish mercenaries, the Ghent regime began a campaign of conquest of other Flanders cities, that resulted in the founding of a number of other Calvinist city republics, governed by other councils of Achttienmannen. This caused the reaction of Catholic partisans, known as the Malcontents, that eventually resulted in the secession of the Walloon provinces in the Union of Arras.

Orange and others in the States General were dismayed by these developments. In November and December 1578 Orange conspired with the more moderate Ryhove to bring about the fall of Hembyse. In December 1578 Orange came to Ghent at the head of a small army, and reformed the Ghent government, at the same time imposing a "religious peace" that gave equal freedom of religion to Calvinists and Catholics. Hem byse was forced to go into exile in the Palatinate, together with Dathenus.

Hembyse remained in exile until he was recalled by the Ghent government after another coup in August 1583, and restored in his function of First Schepen. The military situation for the Calvinists in Flanders had meanwhile become desperate after Alexander Farnese, Duke of Parma, the royal governor-general, made steady progress in his reconquest of the "Disobedient" Dutch provinces with his Spanish Army of Flanders, supported by the Malcontents. City after city fell to the Spaniards. Ryhove moved to Dendermonde after he in turn had been removed from power in Ghent, and blockaded the supply lines to Ghent from Antwerp, thereby weakening the defensive efforts of Ghent against the siege that Parma laid in early 1584. While Hembyse held a dictatorial grip on the city he nevertheless started secret negotiations with Parma. When this was discovered by the city government he was arrested in May 1584 on suspicion of treason. He was tried and convicted by the schepenen of Ghent and executed by decapitation on 8 August 1584. The city surrendered to Parma on 17 August 1584.

== Sources ==
- Ph. Blommaert (1839). "Het Beklag van joncheer Jan van Hembyse; dichlstuk der 16e eeuw". Google Books (in Dutch).
- Bussemaker, C.H.T. (1895). "De afscheiding der Waalsche gewesten van de Generale Unie. Eerste Deel". Google Books (in Dutch). Erven F. Bohn.
- Bussemaker, C.H.T. (1896). "De afscheiding der Waalsche gewesten van de Generale Unie. Tweede Deel". Google Books (in Dutch). Erven F. Bohn.
- A. van der Lem. "Het verhaal van de Opstand. Hoofdstuk 5: De scheiding in de Nederlanden". De Tachtigjarige Oorlog, Universiteit Leiden (in Dutch). Archived from the original on 18 September 2011.
- B. Vander Schelden (2010). "De Gentse stadsmagistraat tijdens de calvinistische Republiek (1577-1584)" (PDF). Library University Ghent (in Dutch). Universiteit Gent.
