= Emanuel Philibert de Lalaing =

Emanuel Filibert van Lalaing (Valenciennes, May 5, 1557 – Mons December 27, 1590) was a noble and army commander from the Low Countries.

Emanuel Philibert was the third son of Charles II de Lalaing and Marie of Montmorency. He was Lord of Montigny and Margrave of Renty. Later he was also Count of Lalaing and Marquis of Renty.

In 1576, together with Philip de Lalaing (1537–1582), his half-brother and stadtholder of Hainault, he joined the States-General of the Netherlands against Spain. In the Pacification of Ghent, 16 of the Seventeen Provinces made an alliance to drive out the mutinying Spanish troops. Emanuel became an army commander in the States army until he was decisively beaten in the Battle of Gembloux (1578) (31 januari 1578).
After this defeat, he became a leader of the Malcontents in Hainault. Ha had his own army with which he fought against the Calvinists which ruled Flanders at that time, and took Menen.

Finally Emanuel reconciled with the King of Spain and his Governor Alexander Farnese, Duke of Parma. He signed the Union of Arras in 1579 and became stadtholder of Hainault. He was also made Admiral of Flanders and Knight in the Order of the Golden Fleece.
Emanuel served Farnese during many sieges in Flanders and Brabant, until he was wounded during the siege of Corbeil. He died of his wounds in Mons.

== Marriage and children ==
He married Anne de Cröy (died 1608), daughter of William of Croÿ, Marquis of Renty and Anne of Renesse. He inherited the title of Marquis of Renty from his father-in-law.
They had 2 children

- Alexander (1583–1604), killed in the Siege of Sluys
- Jeanne (died 1649), married Jean de Croÿ, Count of Solre. Had issue.

== Sources ==
- NNBW
- GENEANET
- the Lalaing family (in Spanish)
