= Malcontents (Low Countries) =

Catholic nobles who opposed William the Silent in the Eighty Years' War

The Malcontents in the context of the Eighty Years' War or the Dutch Revolt were a faction of Catholic nobles in Hainaut and Artois who openly opposed William the Silent, also known as William of Orange, the leader of the States General of the Netherlands in the Union of Brussels of the Habsburg Netherlands during the period after the adoption of the Pacification of Ghent. They formed the Union of Arras in January 1579 and negotiated a separate peace with the Spanish Crown, represented by the royal governor-general Alexander Farnese, Duke of Parma, in the form of the Treaty of Arras (1579), signed on 17 May 1579.

== History ==
After the provinces of the Habsburg Netherlands in 1576 formed a united front against their overlord, Philip II of Spain, when they concluded the Pacification of Ghent and the Union of Brussels, they soon achieved most of their goals as Philip and his new governor-general Don Juan saw no other option than to accept those treaties and remove the mercenaries of the Spanish Army of Flanders from the country. The rebelling provinces of Holland and Zeeland were reunited with the rest of the country under the government of the States General and the Council of State in which Orange was the leading noble. Under the Pacification of Ghent Calvinists in Holland and Zeeland received freedom of religion next to the Catholic Church that was to remain the dominant religion in the other provinces. But soon Calvinists in other provinces demanded freedom of religion also, and adherents of both religions started to use force against one another. This caused great unrest in the conservative Catholic provinces of the South, like Hainaut and Artois (but also Namur and Luxembourg) where the Catholic nobility saw its position and that of their church threatened.

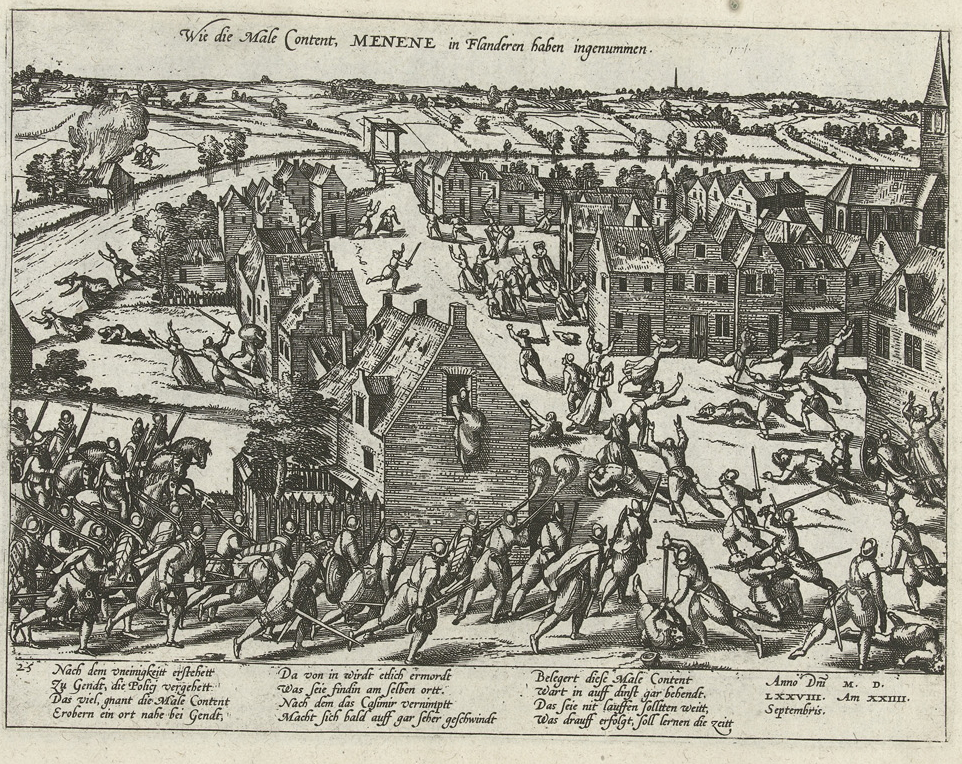
Conquest of Menen by the Malcontents, 24 september 1578

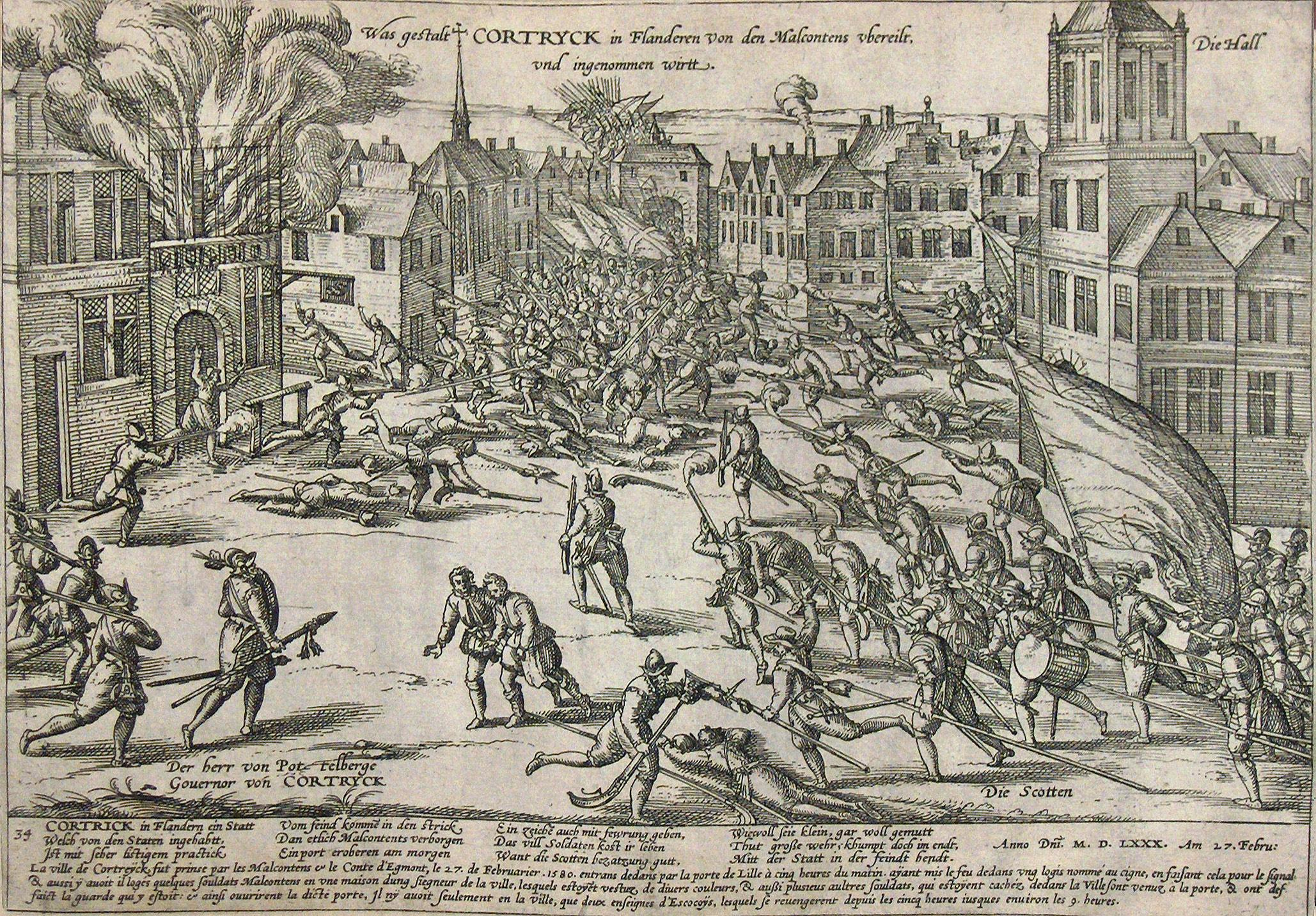
Conquest of Kortrijk by the Malcontents and Philip, Count of Egmont, 27 february 1580

When the Calvinists seized power in several Flemish and Brabant cities, like Ghent (where they founded a Calvinist republic), Bruges and Antwerp and started to repress Catholics in those cities, Walloon irregular troops in the employ of the army of the States General (the precursor of the Dutch States Army) mutinied. They became known as "Malcontents", (Note: Possibly in reference to the contemporaneous French Malcontents, though the term was also used in contemporaneous Scotland in contradistinction with "Biencontents". Cf. Kerr-Peterson, Miles and Steven J. Reid (2016). James VI and Noble Power in Scotland 1578-1603. Routledge. ISBN 9781351982870.) when they seized the city of Menen on 6 September 1578 under the command of Emanuel Philibert de Lalaing (commonly referred to as "Montigny" in the literature), the brother of the stadtholder of Hainaut, Philip de Lalaing, 3rd Count of Lalaing. This "coup" enhanced the reputation of Montigny appreciably among Catholic partisans, and his troops were soon reinforced with the mercenary troops of the Duke of Anjou, who left the country dejectedly in the Summer of 1578. Many of the commanders of the States Army that was destroyed by Parma in the Battle of Gembloux (1578) also flocked to Montigny's banner, like Antoine de Goignies (commonly known as "La Motte"), who had become governor of Gravelines for the States General, but was in secret communication with Don Juan.

From a designation of Montigny's irregulars the word "Malcontents" soon became a kind of "nom de gueux" for partisans of the Catholic cause in general, as opposed to the Calvinist faction, and the moderate "Politiques" around William of Orange. Montigny and his brother Philip, using Philip's power base in Hainaut, started communications between Parma (after Don Juan died in October 1578) and the States of Hainaut and Artois, and a number of city governments (Lille, Arras, Orchies, and Douai, together forming French Flanders), under the influence of the governor of Lille, Adrien d'Ognies, seigneur de Willerval. This led to a congress of representatives of those political entities in Arras that on 6 January 1579 subscribed to a declaration in which the "machinations" of the Calvinists and the "weak" religious-peace policies of William were denounced, and the participants swore to uphold the Catholic religion and to support each other in this endeavor. This alliance became known as the Union of Arras.

Finally, the members of the Union started formal peace negotiations with Parma, which issued in the signing of the Treaty of Arras (1579) on 17 May 1579. In a sense this was a triumph of the great nobles who had before 1566 opposed Cardinal Granvelle, but at the price of a permanent breach between the Northern Netherlands (united in the Union of Utrecht) and the Southern Netherlands that would soon evolve from the Union of Arras to the Spanish Netherlands.

== Sources ==
- Blok, P.J. (1900). History of the People of the Netherlands: The war with Spain. G. P. Putnam's sons – via Internet Archive. "History of the People of the Netherlands: The war with Spain."
- Bussemaker, C.H.T. (1895). "De afscheiding der Waalsche gewesten van de Generale Unie (2 vols.)". Google Books (in Dutch). Erven F. Bohn.
- Bussemaker, C.H.T. (1896). "De afscheiding der Waalsche gewesten van de Generale Unie. Tweede Deel". Google Books (in Dutch). Erven F. Bohn.
- "Lettres inédites de Philippe II, du prince de Parme, du cardinal de Granvelle, adressées à Messire Oudart de Bournonville, l'un des chefs des malcontents (1578 à 1585)". Google Books (in French). Malo et Levasseur. 1855.
