= Elbertus Leoninus =

Jurist and politician from Netherlands

Elbertus Leoninus was the Latinized name of Elbert de Leeuw (1519 or 1520 in Zaltbommel – 6 December 1598 in Arnhem), Dutch jurist and statesman, who helped negotiate the Pacification of Ghent.

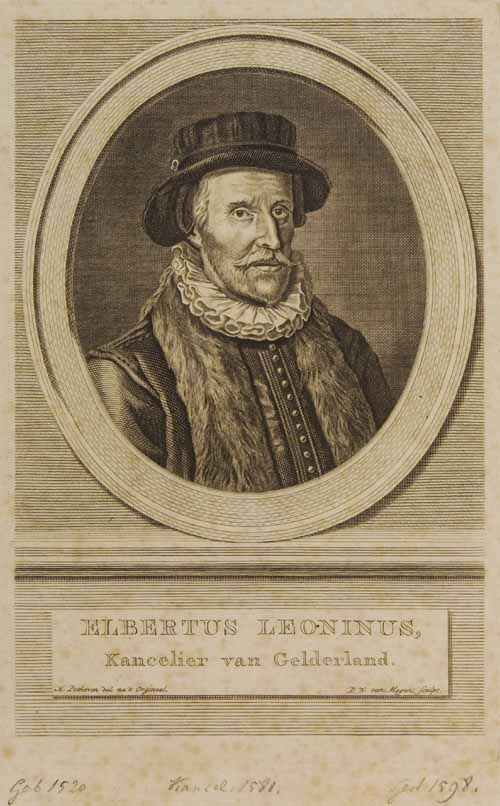
Elbertus Leoninus, engraving from the later 18th century.

== Family life ==
Leoninus was born into a non-aristocratic, but well-to-do family, who were able to give him a very good education. He had a tall stature, which later earned him the Latin nickname Longolinus. At first he studied humaniora under Macropedius at Utrecht, and next in Emmerich am Rhein under Matthias Bredenbach. He entered the University of Leuven to study at the Collegium Trilingue for further grounding in the classical languages, and then obtained a licentiate in Law at the same university in 1547. To improve his fluency in French he then studied for a year in Arras. On 7 June 1548 in Leuven he married Barbara de Haze, the daughter of a renowned Leuven law professor, Johannes Hasius.

== Career ==
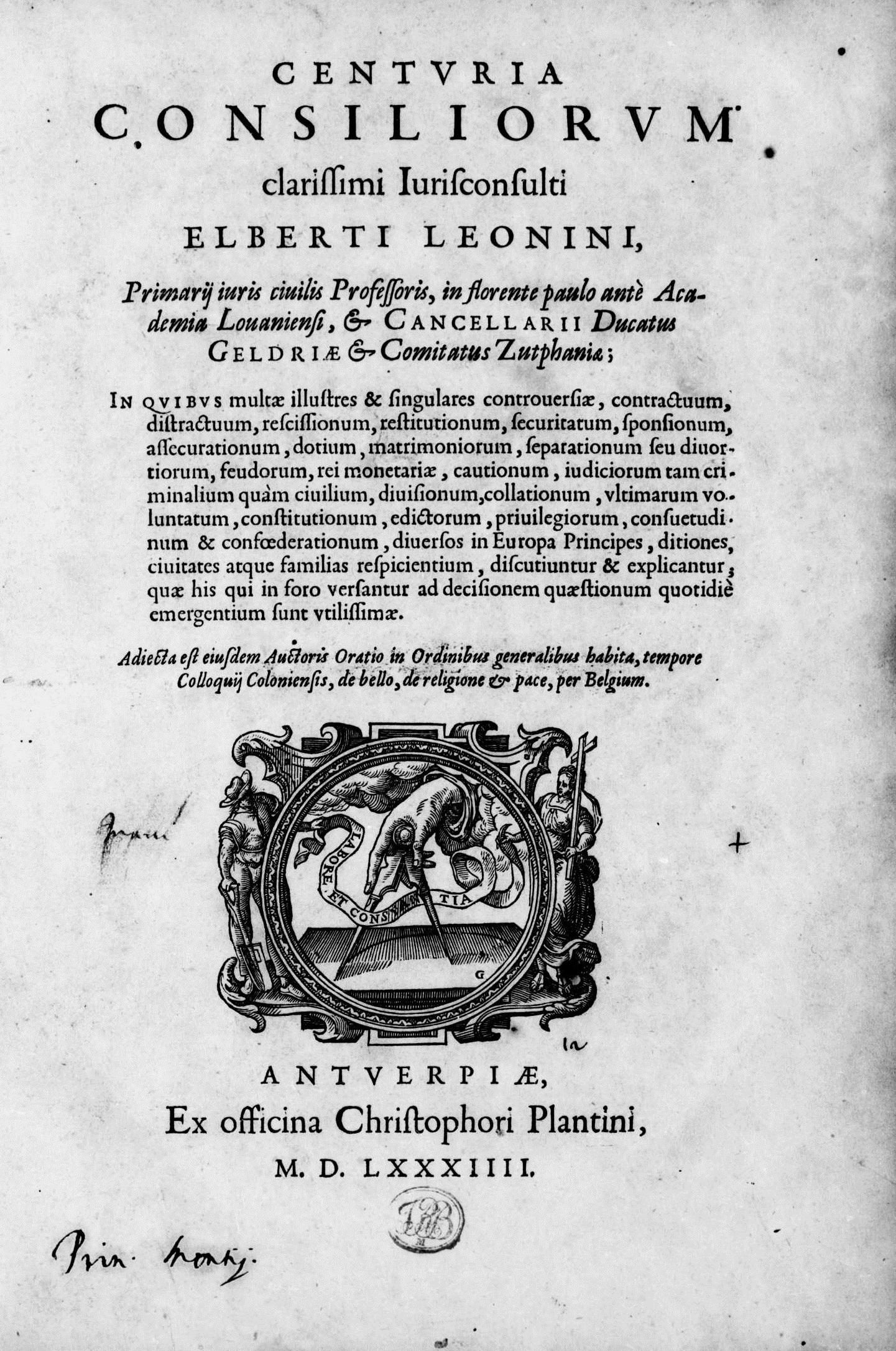
Centuria consiliorum, 1584

Two days after the marriage he was appointed professor in canon law at the university of Leuven. He got his doctor's degree in law on 20 May 1550 under Gabriel Mudaeus, and succeeded that luminary as professor primarius legum in 1560 (a chair he would hold till 1580). Together with Viglius van Aytta, another influential jurist, he managed to persuade the government of the Habsburg Netherlands to endow three more chairs at the Leuven law faculty in these years.

This illustrates the influence he exerted at the court of the Regent, Margaret of Parma. He advised all the grandees of the time on both sides of the political divide that was forming in these years, which explains his later acceptability to both sides during the early years of the Dutch Revolt that would soon break out. During the initial stages of the Revolt he remained loyal to Philip II of Spain and the first two governors-general the king sent to quell the Rebellion.

In 1575 he led the delegation of the Brussels government of Luis de Zúñiga y Requesens to the abortive peace negotiations with William the Silent and the rebellious provinces at Breda. When Requesens died in 1576, and the States-General of the Netherlands briefly took over command of the loyalist government, he was appointed the head of the delegation of the States-General that negotiated the Pacification of Ghent with Orange.

In the next few years his political loyalties shifted more and more against the loyalist side, probably because of the attitude of the new governor-general John of Austria. When the States-General quarrelled with Don Juan and appointed their own governor-general, Archduke Matthias, he became one of the members of his Council of State. However, he remained a politician of great moderation, both in political and religious matters, and kept exerting himself for reconciliation, even after the abortive peace negotiations in the Spring of 1579 in Cologne. In 1580 he resigned his chair at Leuven university and declined a chair at the new Leiden University.

On the recommendation of the Prince of Orange the States of Gelderland (his native province) appointed him chancellor of that province on 28 June 1581. As such, he played an important role in preventing the betrayal of the province to the Spaniards by its stadtholder Willem IV van den Bergh in 1583. Still a member of the Raad van State (Council of State), he headed the delegation of the States-General that offered the sovereignty of the northern Netherlands to king Henry III of France in Senlis in 1585, without result. The next year (17 January 1586) he welcomed Robert Dudley, 1st Earl of Leicester on behalf of the States-General as governor-general of the northern Netherlands, and saw his membership of the new Raad van State renewed. He would remain a member till his death.

He remained one of the most prominent jurists of the Dutch Republic in these years (He is one of six eminent jurists whose faces are shown on the facade of the old building of the Department of Justice at Het Plein in The Hague ). As chancellor of Gelderland he helped codify the laws of the Veluwe Quarter of the province. His many writings in the field of law were compiled in Centuria consilium (Antwerp, 1581 and later), and after his death edited by his grandson Elbert Zoes as Emendationum sive observationum libri septem (Arnhem, 1610). He influenced Hugo Grotius.

He also wrote historical works:

- Fragmentarium historiae belli Belgici auctore Elberto Leonino
- Excerpta ex Historia manuscripta

When he died in 1598, one day after his friend Philips of Marnix, lord of Sint-Aldegonde (who had sat on the opposite side at the negotiations over the Pacification of Ghent in 1576) the Calvinist Arnhem Consistory refused him a funeral service, because they had their doubts about his orthodoxy. Indeed, he probably was (like his sponsor William the Silent) what has been called a Politique. His widow moved to Antwerp (then in the Southern Netherlands) shortly after his death, declaring that she had always remained a Catholic.

== Sources ==
- (in Dutch) Jansen, A.E.M, "Elbertus Leoninus," in: Kuys, J.A.E., Kemperink, R.M., Pelzers, E. (2000) Biografisch woordenboek van Gelderland: Bekende en onbekende mannen en vrouwen uit de Gelderse geschiedenis, Uitgeverij Verloren, ISBN 90-6550-624-1, pp. 58–62
