= Union of Arras =

16th-century alliance of Netherlands provinces, also called the Union of Atrecht

The Union of Arras (Dutch: Unie van Atrecht, French: Union d'Arras, Spanish: Unión de Arrás) was an alliance between the County of Artois, the County of Hainaut and the city of Douai in the Habsburg Netherlands in early 1579 during the Eighty Years' War. Dissatisfied with the religious policies of rebel leader Prince of Orange and the States General of the Netherlands, and especially the rise of the radical Calvinist Republic of Ghent since October 1577, they signed a declaration on 6 January 1579 about their intent to offer a vigorous defense of the Catholic religion against what they saw as encroachments by Calvinists in other provinces. These signatories would begin negotiations for a separate peace with the Spanish Crown, which resulted in the Treaty of Arras of 17 May 1579.

== Background ==
Ghent's radical Calvinists seized power in Flemish cities from October 1577 onwards, a radical act which alienated Catholic rebels to the south in Artois, Hainaut and Douai, respectively. They decided to seek a separate peace with the Spanish king. In response, Calvinist-dominated rebel forces in the north formed the Union of Utrecht, pledging to continue the war against the Spanish forces.

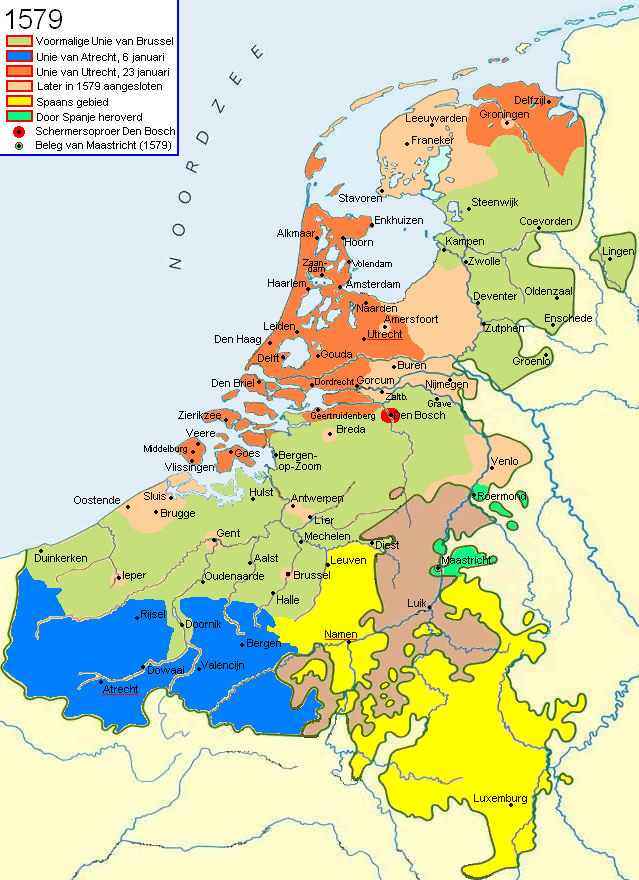
Union of Arras (6 January 1579)
Union of Utrecht (23 January 1579)
Joined Union of Utrecht later
Controlled by unaligned rebel troops
Controlled by Spanish troops
Conquered by Spanish troops

After the Pacification of Ghent, the entire Habsburg Netherlands was united in opposition to the government of king Philip II of Spain, the overlord of the Netherlands. They formed the Union of Brussels that constituted a formal government, formed by the States General and a governor-general who was appointed by the States General: the archduke Matthias, in competition with the royal governor-general, Don Juan of Austria. (Note: Don Juan had initially recognized the Union of Brussels and even concluded the Perpetual Edict, but he broke in July 1577 with the States General.) Orange, the leader of the originally rebelling provinces, Holland and Zeeland, had a leading role in the Council of State that formed the executive for the States General. One of the important provisions of the Pacification was that the Calvinists received freedom of religion in Holland and Zeeland, and would be tolerated elsewhere in the Netherlands, but that the other 15 provinces would officially maintain the Catholic Church as the dominant one. Calvinists in other provinces soon also claimed freedom of religion. In Flanders and Brabant they even used force to change the government of cities like Ghent, Bruges, and Antwerp to obtain this objective, much to the dismay of Catholic politicians in the southern part of the country. Orange tried to promote civil peace with a policy of "religious peace," allowing freedom of worship to both Catholics and Protestants in the entire Netherlands.

== Declaration of 6 January 1579 ==
Don Juan died in October 1578 and was replaced as commander of the Spanish Army of Flanders and royal governor-general by Alexander Farnese, Duke of Parma, who proved an able diplomat, adept at driving wedges between the Catholic nobles in the south and the regime of Orange and the States General. (Note: Who had moved from Brussels to Antwerp after the disastrous defeat of the Dutch States Army at the Battle of Gembloux (1578).) In opposition to the policies of Orange a group of Catholic nobles, known in historiography by the name "Malcontents," had formed under the leadership of the stadtholder of Hainaut, Philip de Lalaing, 3rd Count of Lalaing and Emanuel Philibert de Lalaing. Parma opened negotiations with the Malcontents and they brought about an alliance of Hainaut, Artois, and the city of Douai, which on 6 January 1579 subscribed to a declaration in which they expressed their discontent about the events since the Pacification of Ghent, and (without naming names) rejected the "religious peace" policy of Orange. The declaration issued in the following rousing promise:

A ceste cause, en vertu de nos povoirs et commissions, respectivement et aultrement, avons promis et juré, promettons et jurons les uns aux aultres, en foy de chrestiens et gens de bien, pour nous et noz successeurs à jamais, suyvant le contenu exprès de ladicte union, et à l'effect et accomplissement d'icelle, de persévérer et maintenir nostredicte saincte foy catholique, apostolique, romaine, deue obéissance de Sa Majesté et pacification de Gand, aussy procurer le bien, salut, paix et repos de nostre patrie tant désolée, conservant nos priviléges, droicts, franchises, coustumes et usances anciennes; de résister et opposer, par toutes voyes et manières licites, deues et raisonnables, à tous ceulx qui vouldroient attenter au contraire, et à ces fins ayder, conforter et assister l'un l'aultre, et de commune main emploier noz vies, corps, biens et tous aultres moyens, nous submettans à toutes résolutions que par commun advis seront faictes pour le bien et advancement de ceste cause, soit pour levée de deniers, de gens de guerre ou aultremen;... (Note: "To this end, by virtue of our powers and commissions, respectively and at different times, we have promised and sworn, promise and swear to one another, in faith of Christians and good people, for us and our successors forever, following the express content of said union, and to the effect and fulfillment thereof, to persevere and maintain our holy faith, Catholic, apostolic, Roman, due obedience to His Majesty and the pacification of Ghent, also to procure the well-being, welfare, peace, and repose of our country so desolate, preserving our privileges, rights, franchises, customs and old usages; to resist and oppose, by all licit, due and reasonable ways and means, all those who would attempt the opposite, and for these purposes to help, comfort and assist one another, and in common employ our lives, bodies, properties, and all other means; submitting to all resolutions that by common advice will be made for the good and advancement of this cause, whether for the raising of funds, of troops, or otherwise;")

Beyond this promise the declaration did not contain more concrete resolutions, such as the formation of a defensive alliance, like a number of the northern provinces formed later in January 1579 in the form of the Union of Utrecht. But this was not to be expected, as the signers of the declaration considered themselves the "true" defenders of the Union of Brussels, that they intended to continue.

== Peace of Arras ==
History of the Low Countries (schematic)
| Frisii | | Germanic tribes | | Belgae & Celts | | | |
| Frisii | Cana– nefates (Note: Roman foederati) | Chamavi, Tubantes (Note: The Chamavi merged into the confederation of the Franks; the Tubantes merged into the confederation of the Saxons.) | | Gallia Belgica (55 BC–c. 5th century AD); Germania Inferior (83–c. 5th century) | | | |
| Frisii | Cana– nefates | Salian Franks | | Batavi | | | |
| unpopulated (4th –c. 5th centuries) | | Saxons | Salian Franks (4th–c. 5th centuries) | | | | |
| Frisian Kingdom (c. 6th century – 734) | | Saxons | Frankish Kingdom (481–843)—Carolingian Empire (800–843) | | | | |
| Frisian Kingdom (c. 6th century – 734) | | Austrasia (511–687) | | | | | |
| Middle Francia (843–855) | | | | West; Francia (from 843) | Middle Francia (843–855) | | |
| Kingdom of Lotharingia (Note: Part of East Francia after 939, divided in Upper Lorraine (as part of West Francia) and Lower Lorraine (as part of East Francia) in 959.) (855–959); Duchy of Lower Lorraine (Note: Lower Lorraine—also referred to as Lothier—disintegrated into several smaller independent territories and only the title of a "Duke of Lothier" remained, held by Brabant.) (from 959) | | | Kingdom of Lotharingia (855–959); Duchy of Lower Lorraine (from 959) | West; Francia (from 843) | Kingdom of Lotharingia (855–959); Duchy of Lower Lorraine (from 959) | | |
| Frisia | | | Kingdom of Lotharingia (855–959); Duchy of Lower Lorraine (from 959) | County of Flanders (Note: Including County of Artois (part of Flanders until 1237) and Tournaisis.) (862–1384) | Kingdom of Lotharingia (855–959); Duchy of Lower Lorraine (from 959) | | |
| Frisian; Freedom (Note: Lordship of Frisia and Lordship of Groningen (including the Ommelanden) after 1524 and 1536 respectively.) (11th–16th centuries) | County of Holland (Note: Including County of Zeeland, that was ruled by neighboring County of Holland and County of Flanders (until 1432).) (880–1432) | Bishopric of Utrecht (Note: Utrecht included Lordship of Overijssel (until 1528), County of Drenthe (until 1528) and County of Zutphen (until 1182).) (695–1456) | Duchy of Brabant (Note: Duchy of Brabant included since 1288 also the Duchy of Limburg (now part of Belgium's Liège Province) and the "Overmaas" lands Dalhem, Valkenburg and Herzogenrath (now part of the Dutch Province of Limburg).) (1183–1430) Duchy of Guelders (Note: The county, later duchy, of Guelders consisted of four quarters, as they were separated by rivers: situated upstream Upper Quarter (the present day northern half of the Dutch province of Limburg), spatially separated from the three downstream Lower Quarters: County of Zutphen (after 1182), Veluwe Quarter and Nijmegen Quarter. The three lower quarters emerged from the historic gau Hamaland (named after the Chamavi tribe), and formed the present day province of Gelderland. Guelders did not include the Cleves enclave Huissen and the independent counties of Buren and Culemborg, that were much later seceded to the province of Gelderland.) (1046–1543) | County of Flanders (862–1384) | County of Hainaut (1071–1432) County of Namur (981–1421) | Prince- Bishopric of Liège (Note: Throughout the Middle Ages, the bishopric was further expanded with the Duchy of Bouillon in 1096 (ceded to France in 1678), the acquisition of the county of Loon in 1366 and the county of Horne in 1568. The Lordship of Mechelen was also part of the Prince-Bishopric of Liège.)(980–1791) | Duchy of Luxembourg (1059–1443) |
| Frisian; Freedom (11th–16th centuries) | Burgundian Netherlands (1384–1482) | | | | | Prince- Bishopric of Liège (980–1791) | Burgundian Netherlands (1384–1482) |
| Habsburg Netherlands (1482–1795) (Seventeen Provinces after 1543) (Note: The name Seventeen Provinces came in use after the Habsburg emperor Charles V had re-acquired the Duchy of Guelders, and an continuous territory arose.) | | | | | | Prince- Bishopric of Liège (980–1791) | Habsburg Netherlands (1482–1795) (Seventeen Provinces after 1543) |
| Dutch Republic (1581–1795) | | | | Spanish Netherlands (1556–1714) | | Prince- Bishopric of Liège (980–1791) | Spanish Netherlands (1556–1714) |
| Dutch Republic (1581–1795) | | | | Austrian Netherlands (1714–1795) | | Prince- Bishopric of Liège (980–1791) | Austrian Netherlands (1714–1795) |
| Dutch Republic (1581–1795) | | | | United States of Belgium (1790) | | Republic of Liège (1789–'91) | United States of Belgium (1790) |
| Dutch Republic (1581–1795) | | | | Austrian Netherlands (1795–1797) | | P.-Bish. of Liège (1791–1794) | Austrian Netherlands (1795–1797) |
| Batavian Republic (1795–1806); Kingdom of Holland (1806–1810) | | | associated with French First Republic (1795–1804) part of First French Empire (1804–1815) | | | | |
| part of First French Empire (1810–1813) | | | associated with French First Republic (1795–1804) part of First French Empire (1804–1815) | | | | |
| Sovereign Principality of the Netherlands (1813–1815) | | | associated with French First Republic (1795–1804) part of First French Empire (1804–1815) | | | | |
| United Kingdom of the Netherlands (1815–1830) | | | | | | | Grand Duchy of Luxembourg (from 1815) |
| Kingdom of the Netherlands (from 1839) | | | | Kingdom of Belgium (from 1830) | | | Grand Duchy of Luxembourg (from 1815) |
| Kingdom of the Netherlands (from 1839) | | | | Kingdom of Belgium (from 1830) | | | Grand Duchy of Luxembourg (from 1890) |

However, the members of the Union of Arras soon opened peace negotiations with Parma, which resulted in the signing of the Treaty of Arras (1579) on 17 May 1579. These were the main conditions:

- The provisions of the Pacification of Ghent, the Perpetual Edict and the Union of Brussels were reaffirmed, both by the Spanish Crown and the members of the Union of Arras;
- There should be no more garrisons of foreign mercenary troops, either paid by Spain or by the States General;
- The Council of State should be organized like that of the time of Charles V;
- Two-thirds of the council members should be installed by all States of the member provinces consenting;
- All privileges that were in force at the time of the reign of Charles V should be reinstated;
- Taxes imposed after the reign of Charles V were to be abolished;
- Catholicism was the only allowed religion. Any other religion (i.e. Calvinism) should be prohibited.

The provinces that signed the Peace were:

- County of Hainaut
- County of Artois
- Lille, Douai and Orchies (Walloon Flanders)

The regions that favored the Peace, but did not sign it at time (though they later acceded), were

- County of Namur,
- County of Luxembourg,
- Duchy of Limburg.

Parma used these "reconciled" counties as a base to start his reconquest of the "disobedient" provinces (members of the Union of Utrecht).

== See also ==
- Union of Utrecht
