= Union of Utrecht =

1579 treaty unifying the northern Netherlands provinces

- Signed: 23 January 1579

History of the Low Countries (schematic)
Frisii		Germanic tribes		Belgae & Celts			
Frisii	Cana– nefates (Note: Roman foederati)	Chamavi, Tubantes (Note: The Chamavi merged into the confederation of the Franks; the Tubantes merged into the confederation of the Saxons.)		Gallia Belgica (55 BC–c. 5th century AD); Germania Inferior (83–c. 5th century)			
Frisii	Cana– nefates	Salian Franks		Batavi			
unpopulated (4th –c. 5th centuries)		Saxons	Salian Franks (4th–c. 5th centuries)				
Frisian Kingdom (c. 6th century – 734)		Saxons	Frankish Kingdom (481–843)—Carolingian Empire (800–843)				
Frisian Kingdom (c. 6th century – 734)		Austrasia (511–687)					
Middle Francia (843–855)				West; Francia (from 843)	Middle Francia (843–855)		
Kingdom of Lotharingia (Note: Part of East Francia after 939, divided in Upper Lorraine (as part of West Francia) and Lower Lorraine (as part of East Francia) in 959.) (855–959); Duchy of Lower Lorraine (Note: Lower Lorraine—also referred to as Lothier—disintegrated into several smaller independent territories and only the title of a "Duke of Lothier" remained, held by Brabant.) (from 959)			Kingdom of Lotharingia (855–959); Duchy of Lower Lorraine (from 959)	West; Francia (from 843)	Kingdom of Lotharingia (855–959); Duchy of Lower Lorraine (from 959)		
Frisia			Kingdom of Lotharingia (855–959); Duchy of Lower Lorraine (from 959)	County of Flanders (Note: Including County of Artois (part of Flanders until 1237) and Tournaisis.) (862–1384)	Kingdom of Lotharingia (855–959); Duchy of Lower Lorraine (from 959)		
Frisian; Freedom (Note: Lordship of Frisia and Lordship of Groningen (including the Ommelanden) after 1524 and 1536 respectively.) (11th–16th centuries)	County of Holland (Note: Including County of Zeeland, that was ruled by neighboring County of Holland and County of Flanders (until 1432).) (880–1432)	Bishopric of Utrecht (Note: Utrecht included Lordship of Overijssel (until 1528), County of Drenthe (until 1528) and County of Zutphen (until 1182).) (695–1456)	Duchy of Brabant (Note: Duchy of Brabant included since 1288 also the Duchy of Limburg (now part of Belgium's Liège Province) and the "Overmaas" lands Dalhem, Valkenburg and Herzogenrath (now part of the Dutch Province of Limburg).) (1183–1430) Duchy of Guelders (Note: The county, later duchy, of Guelders consisted of four quarters, as they were separated by rivers: situated upstream Upper Quarter (the present day northern half of the Dutch province of Limburg), spatially separated from the three downstream Lower Quarters: County of Zutphen (after 1182), Veluwe Quarter and Nijmegen Quarter. The three lower quarters emerged from the historic gau Hamaland (named after the Chamavi tribe), and formed the present day province of Gelderland. Guelders did not include the Cleves enclave Huissen and the independent counties of Buren and Culemborg, that were much later seceded to the province of Gelderland.) (1046–1543)	County of Flanders (862–1384)	County of Hainaut (1071–1432) County of Namur (981–1421)	Prince- Bishopric of Liège (Note: Throughout the Middle Ages, the bishopric was further expanded with the Duchy of Bouillon in 1096 (ceded to France in 1678), the acquisition of the county of Loon in 1366 and the county of Horne in 1568. The Lordship of Mechelen was also part of the Prince-Bishopric of Liège.)(980–1791)	Duchy of Luxembourg (1059–1443)
Frisian; Freedom (11th–16th centuries)	Burgundian Netherlands (1384–1482)					Prince- Bishopric of Liège (980–1791)	Burgundian Netherlands (1384–1482)
Habsburg Netherlands (1482–1795) (Seventeen Provinces after 1543) (Note: The name Seventeen Provinces came in use after the Habsburg emperor Charles V had re-acquired the Duchy of Guelders, and an continuous territory arose.)						Prince- Bishopric of Liège (980–1791)	Habsburg Netherlands (1482–1795) (Seventeen Provinces after 1543)
Dutch Republic (1581–1795)				Spanish Netherlands (1556–1714)		Prince- Bishopric of Liège (980–1791)	Spanish Netherlands (1556–1714)
Dutch Republic (1581–1795)				Austrian Netherlands (1714–1795)		Prince- Bishopric of Liège (980–1791)	Austrian Netherlands (1714–1795)
Dutch Republic (1581–1795)				United States of Belgium (1790)		Republic of Liège (1789–'91)	United States of Belgium (1790)
Dutch Republic (1581–1795)				Austrian Netherlands (1795–1797)		P.-Bish. of Liège (1791–1794)	Austrian Netherlands (1795–1797)
Batavian Republic (1795–1806); Kingdom of Holland (1806–1810)			associated with French First Republic (1795–1804) part of First French Empire (1804–1815)				
part of First French Empire (1810–1813)			associated with French First Republic (1795–1804) part of First French Empire (1804–1815)				
Sovereign Principality of the Netherlands (1813–1815)			associated with French First Republic (1795–1804) part of First French Empire (1804–1815)				
United Kingdom of the Netherlands (1815–1830)							Grand Duchy of Luxembourg (from 1815)
Kingdom of the Netherlands (from 1839)				Kingdom of Belgium (from 1830)			Grand Duchy of Luxembourg (from 1815)
Kingdom of the Netherlands (from 1839)				Kingdom of Belgium (from 1830)			Grand Duchy of Luxembourg (from 1890)

The Union of Utrecht (Dutch: Unie van Utrecht) was an alliance based on an agreement concluded on 23 January 1579 between a number of Dutch provinces and cities, to reach a joint commitment against the king, Philip II of Spain. By joining forces, they hoped to force him to stop his harsh administrative measures. In addition, some important political matters were regulated in areas such as defence, taxation and religion, which is why the treaty in question is also seen as a first version or precursor of a later constitution. The Union of Utrecht complemented the so-called General Union of 1576, established by the Pacification of Ghent, which is why it is also referred to as the Further Union.

== Previous history ==
=== Earlier alliances ===
The signing of the treaty for the Union of Utrecht, during the Eighty Years' War (1568–1648), was preceded by a whole series of unions, edicts and covenants. At the Union of Dordrecht, on 4 July 1575, William of Orange was appointed stadholder of Holland and Holland and Zeeland decided to cooperate. These areas – except for Amsterdam and Middelburg, among others – were largely free of Spanish troops in the years 1572–1576, and there leaders with the Calvinist faith gained the upper hand. The Spanish sack of Antwerp on 4 November 1576, in which Spanish troops looted and reduced the city to ashes and killed thousands of citizens, caused a stir in the Netherlands. The States of Holland, the States of Zeeland and the other regions, which were predominantly Catholic, reconciled on 8 November with the Pacification of Ghent in their aversion to the Spanish presence. They declared at the Pacification that they would cooperate in resisting interventions by King Philip II but remain obedient to him. There was no final settlement of the religious issue. For the time being, the Calvinist religion would be leading in Holland and Zeeland, the Catholic religion in the other regions, but religious peace would be sought in all regions.

In Holland and Zeeland, however, Calvinists took little notice of the agreements. And returning Calvinist exiles who had once fled from Alva sometimes caused serious religious disturbances in the then church- and king-faithful regions outside Holland and Zeeland after 1576.

The agreements of the Pacification of Ghent were confirmed at the first Union of Brussels on 6 January 1577, by which the regions wanted to force the new governor Don Juan of Austria to recognise the Pacification; the Spanish soldiers were to leave the country and the regions themselves would take care of maintaining Catholicism, much against the wishes of the Calvinists. The governor finally agreed by signing the Eternal Edict on 12 February, after which Spanish troops began to withdraw, largely to the Duchy of Luxembourg, which had always remained royalist. That same month, William of Orange urged Guelders to "form a good, firm alliance and bond in private with those of Holland and Zeeland, as well as other provinces with some of the leading lords and nobles." Rather than break the Pacification, the prince wanted to raise a second line of defence in a ‘further union’. The concept of the Union of Utrecht was already contained in this proposal to Gelre. However, the predominantly Catholic Gelre saw little point in it; it did not want to depend on intransigent, Calvinist Holland for a possible reconciliation with the king.

== History ==
The Union of Utrecht is regarded as the foundation of the Republic of the Seven United Provinces, which was not recognized by the Spanish Empire until the Twelve Years' Truce in 1609.

The treaty was signed on 23 January by Holland, Zeeland, Utrecht (but not all of Utrecht), and the province (but not the city) of Groningen. The treaty was a reaction of the Protestant provinces to the 1579 Union of Arras (Dutch: Unie van Atrecht), in which two southern provinces and a city declared their support for Roman Catholic Spain.

During the following months of 1579, other states signed the treaty as well, such as Ghent, cities from Friesland, as well as three of the quarters of Guelders (Nijmegen Quarter, Veluwe Quarter, Zutphen County). In the summer of 1579, Amersfoort from the province of Utrecht also joined, together with Ypres, Antwerp, Breda and Brussels. In February 1580, Lier, Bruges and the surrounding area also signed the treaty. The city of Groningen shifted in favor under influence of the stadtholder for Friesland, George van Rennenberg, and also signed the treaty. The fourth quarter of Guelders, Upper Guelders, never signed the treaty. In April 1580, Overijssel and Drenthe signed on.

Map of the Spanish Netherlands, the Union of Utrecht and the Union of Arras (1579)

The parts of the Low Countries that joined:

- the County of Holland
- the County of Zeeland
- the Lordship of Utrecht
- the Duchy of Guelders
- the Lordship of Groningen
- the Lordship of Friesland
- the County of Drenthe
- the Lordship of Overijssel
- the Duchy of Brabant
- the County of Flanders
- the cities of Tournai and Valenciennes

Antwerp was the capital of the union until its fall to the Spanish.

Flanders was almost entirely conquered by the Spanish troops, as was half of Brabant. The United Provinces still recognized Spanish rule after the Union of Utrecht. However, the union contributed to the deterioration in the relationship between the provinces and their lord, and in 1581 the United Provinces declared their independence of the king in the Act of Abjuration.

The Twelve Years' Truce of 1609 marked a pause in what became known as the Eighty Years' War, effectively acknowledging Dutch independence. As Pieter Geyl puts it, the truce marked "an astonishing victory for the Dutch," who surrendered no lands and did not agree to halt their attacks on Spanish colonies and the Spanish trade empire. In return the Spanish granted the United Provinces de facto independence by describing them as "Free lands, provinces and states against whom they make no claim" for the duration of the truce.

== Religious tolerance ==
The Union of Utrecht allowed complete personal freedom of religion and was thus one of the first unlimited edicts of religious toleration. An additional declaration allowed provinces and cities that wished to remain Roman Catholic to join the union.

== Later reflection ==
Many people view the Union of Utrecht as the beginning of the Netherlands as a single state. This is not entirely accurate. It can be said that the Union of Utrecht laid the foundation for the Dutch Republic, also known as the Seven United Provinces, which would be formed a few years later. However, these seven states within a state only became a centralised state during the time of the Batavian Republic two centuries later.

Until the early 20th century, most Dutch and Belgian historians, such as P. L. Muller (1867) and Henri Pirenne (1911), believed that the Union of Utrecht was initially intended as a "Calvinist alliance" of the "seven" "Northern provinces" that separated themselves from the General Union (the Pacification of Ghent and the Unions of Brussels), and "seceded from the South". The few Southern cities that joined the Union of Utrecht were considered more like "honorary members" rather than fully integrated members of the "Northern" Union. Flemish researcher Leo Delfos further investigated and openly challenged this view from 1929 onwards. He concluded that the Union of Utrecht actually sought to uphold the General Union / Pacification of Ghent of 1576 and did not intend to geographically limit itself to the North, but aimed to include all provinces in the Netherlands. Both the Pacification and the Union of Utrecht were, in fact, treaties between two parties: the Calvinist-governed provinces of Holland and Zeeland and the other 'fifteen' provinces dominated by Catholics. Even Alexander Farnese (Parma), the archenemy of the Union of Utrecht, denied in a letter to the States of Artois dated January 27, 1579, that the newly established Union of Utrecht had a Calvinist foundation. It was only through Parma's military conquests in the 1580s and the political developments in the rebellious region that it gradually became, in practice, a 'Northern Calvinist alliance', but it certainly did not start that way.

== See also ==
- Dutch Revolt
- List of treaties
