= Edict of 1577 =

1577 edict of the Habsburg Netherlands

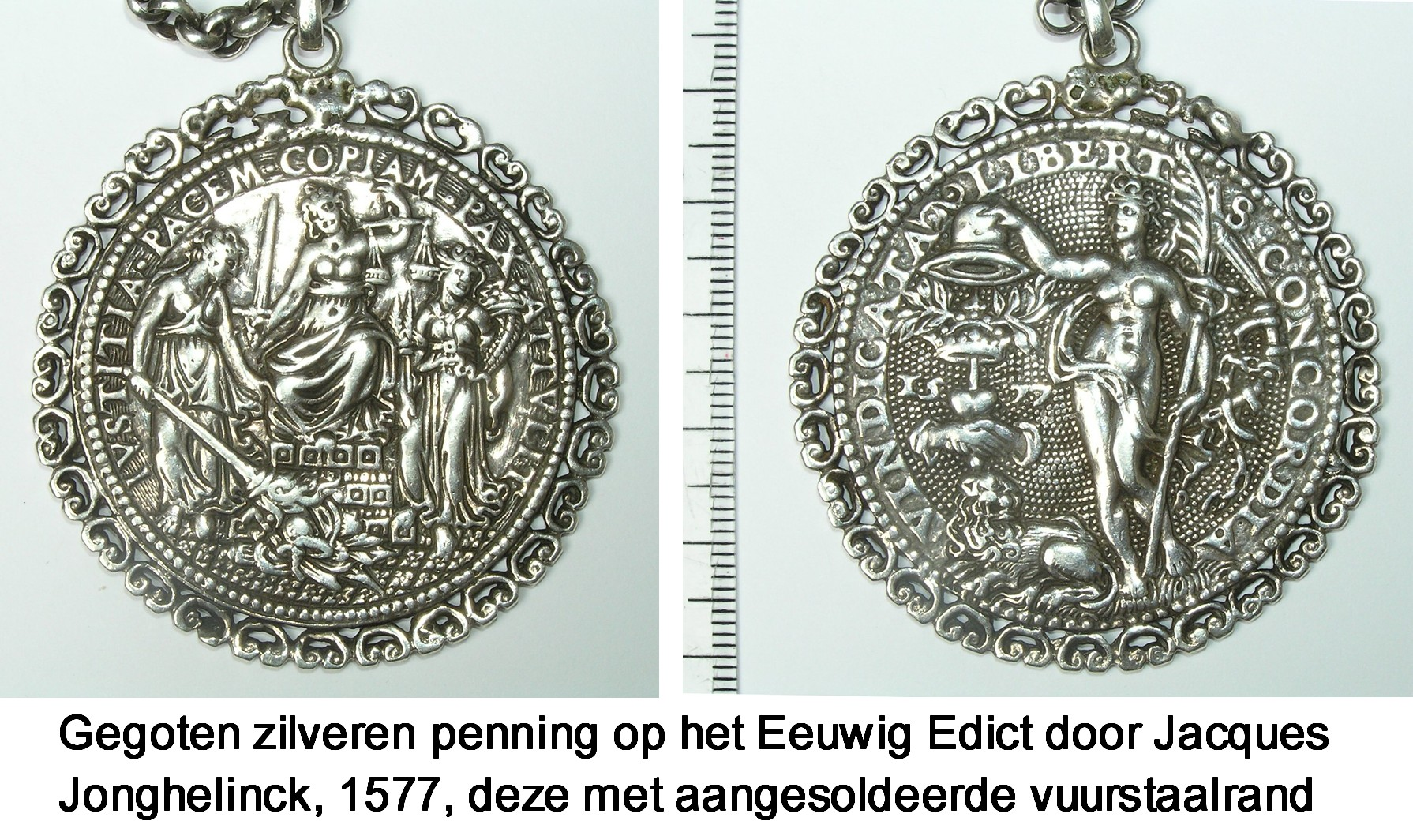

The Edict of 1577 (also known as the Perpetual Edict or the Eternal Edict) was signed on 12 February 1577 in Marche-en-Famenne by the new Spanish governor-general of the Habsburg Netherlands, Don John of Austria. This accord provided for the removal of Spanish forces from the Netherlands. In addition, the edict agreed to uphold the tenets of the Pacification of Ghent in exchange for an understanding that the States General would uphold the monarchy and Catholicism. The edict was initially well received. However, in July 1577, Don John began plans for a new campaign against the Dutch rebels. Elizabeth I approved of both the Pacification of Ghent and the Edict of 1577, therefore offering loans and military aid to the Dutch. When it became clear that John would go back on his agreement, Elizabeth planned to defend the provinces with aid of £100,000 and troops against John if he attacked.

English money paid for John Casimir, Count Palatine of Simmern, a Calvinist zealot, to lead mercenaries as far as Brabant, but the money supply dried up.

== See also ==
- List of treaties
