= Carel Hendrik Theodoor Bussemaker =

Dutch historian

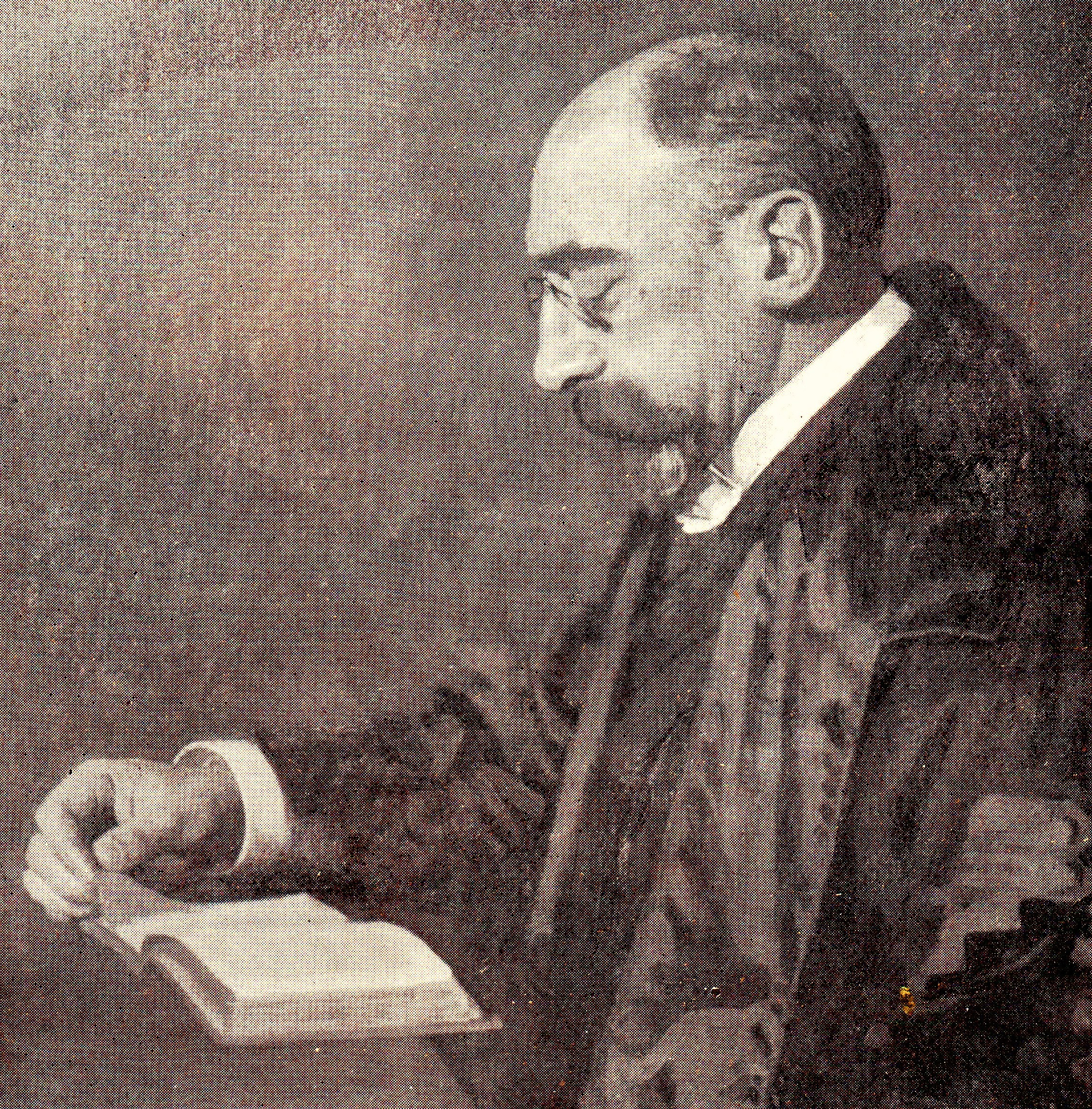
- Carel Hendrik Theodoor Bussemaker by Reinier Bakels
- Born: 5 January 1864; Deventer, Netherlands
- Died: 6 September 1914 (aged 50); Leiden, Netherlands
- Occupation: Historian
- Spouse: Elisabeth Hendrika Hermance Vervoort
- Parent(s): Barend Barlagen Bussemaker; Gertruda Bertha Gerarda Elisabeth Resius

Carel Hendrik Theodoor Bussemaker (5 January 1864 – 6 September 1914) was a Dutch historian who held chairs in history at the University of Groningen and the University of Leiden.

== Personal life ==
Bussemaker was born in Deventer, the son of the brewer Barend Barlagen Bussemaker (a friend of the Dutch translator of the works of William Shakespeare, Leendert Burgersdijk) and Gertruda Bertha Gerarda Elisabeth Resius. After his school years in his native city, he studied Dutch literature at the University of Leiden, where he achieved his master's degree in record time in 1886, despite being very active in extracurricular activities, especially in the Leiden Studentencorps (student association). He married Elisabeth Hendrika Hermance Vervoort on 27 July 1887. They had a son and a daughter.

== Career ==
After completing his studies in Leiden he embarked on a career as a teacher of Dutch literature and geography, first at a high school in Zaltbommel, and later at a high school in Haarlem.

In 1888 he received his doctoral degree in history from the University of Leiden with a dissertation, written under the mentorship of Robert Fruin, entitled:"Geschiedenis van Overijsel gedurende het eerste stadhouderlooze tijdperk. Part I" (History of Overijssel during the First Stadtholderless Period; the second part was published in 1889).

When the Scientific Society Teylers Tweede Genootschap organized an essay contest in 1892, (Note: At the occasion of the publication of P.L. Muller and A. Diegerick, "Documents concernant la relation entre le Duc d'Anjou et les Pays-Bas," (1899); Cf. Brugmans, Levensbericht, p. 30) Bussemaker won the gold medal with his entry, entitled " De afscheiding der Waalsche gewesten van de Generale Unie" (The secession of the Walloon provinces from the General Union), which was in 1895-1896 published in two volumes under the same title. This standard work made his reputation as a historian and consequently he was appointed as the successor of Petrus Johannes Blok on the chair of history and political geography at the University of Groningen. His inaugural oration there on the subject of historiography was entitled: "De behandeling der Algemeene Geschiedenis"(Treatment of General History;1895). Bussemaker remained in Groningen for the next decade. He was also active in the local society of historians. His main interest in these years was diplomatic history, especially of the 18th century.

In 1904 Bussemaker made a journey to Spain at the behest of prof. Blok with the object of studying local archives with respect to documents relevant to Dutch history. He did not achieve the hoped for results, but he contracted a malady that may have contributed to his premature demise a few years later.

When Pieter Lodewijk Muller died in 1905, Bussemaker succeeded him on the chair of General History at the University of Leiden. His inaugural oration of 4 October 1905 was entitled "Over de waardeering der feiten in geschiedvorsching en geschiedschrijving" (On the evaluation of facts in historical research and historiography). In this oration he fully expressed his ideas (that he had first tentatively formulated in a polemic with Blok about the nature of historiography at the occasion of the 1903 congress of the Dutch historical society about the education of historians) about what a historian actually can do in terms of banning subjectivity from the selection of what is "important" (Bussemaker doubted that this was possible, though he did not advocate "subjectivism") and avoiding "value judgments" (again Bussemaker doubted that this was possible). He made fun of the idea that (as Blok advocated) the historian should accept "what was considered important in the historical era itself, without interposing his own judgment", because he doubted its practical feasibility. In terms of the contemporary discussion in German historiography he rejected "positivism" (the emulation of the methods of the natural sciences) in the tradition of Leopold von Ranke (of whom Blok was an adept), but preferred the approach of Wilhelm Windelband and Heinrich Rickert.

He soon became a member of the national commission for the examination of history teachers in secondary education (1904). In 1909 he was appointed a member of the prestigious Advisory Commission for Publications in the History of the Empire, chaired by Herman Theodoor Colenbrander. In 1913 he was made a member of the Royal Netherlands Academy of Arts and Sciences. At the behest of the director of the Royal House Archive, Frederik Jan Louis Krämer, Bussemaker undertook the publication of "Archives ou correspondance inédite de la maison d'Orange-Nassau. 4e Série " (1908-1914; 4 vols.)

Bussemaker may have neglected to publish much research in comparison with e.g. his contemporary Blok, but Bussemaker was popular with his students, because of his inspired teaching. He had a decided influence on Dutch historians Pieter Geyl and Jan Steffen Bartstra.

Bussemaker died suddenly in Leiden on 6 September 1914.

== Works ==
(Note: Bibliography compiled by P.H. van Reedt Dortland; Cf. Brugmans, Levensbericht, pp. 56-58)

1888-89. Geschiedenis van Overijsel gedurende het eerste stadhouderlooze tijd perk. 's-Gravenhage 1888-9. 2 vols.1e dl. Acad. Diss. Leiden. [Reviewed by J.E. Heeres, Spectat. 1889, p. 67, 1890, p. 81].

1891. Joan Derck van de Capellen tot den Pol. (Tijdspiegel 1891 dl. III).

1895. De behandeling der Algemeene Geschiedenis. Oration Groningen. 's-Gravenhage, 1895.

1895-96. De afscheiding der Waalsche gewesten van de Generale Unie. 2 dln. 1895-6. (Verhandelingen uitg. d. Teyler's Tweede Genootschap. N.R.V. 1-2).

1896. Opgave van hetgeen de Colleción de Documentos ineditos para la Historia de España betreffende onze geschiedenis bevat. (Bijdragen voor vaderl. gesch. en oudheidk. 1896). Published as reprint. [Reviews: P.J. Blok, Rev. hist. T. 63 p. 132-4; P.L. Muller, Spect. 1896, p. 126; Rijkenberg, Kath. 110, p. 20; Revue crit. d'hist. & de litt. 1897, III].

1896. Plan van Philips IV om Frederik Hendrik tot het verraden der Republiek om te koopen. (Historische Avonden, p. 135).

1898. Le Rôle politique des Pays-Bas. (Pays-Bas II 1898, 3).

1899. Robert Fruin. (Elzevier, XVII, p. 241).

1899. De republiek der Vereenigde Nederlanden in hare staatkundige betrekkingen gedurende de eerste jaren na den vrede van Utrecht (1713–21). (Gids 1899 III, p. 32).

1900. De Republiek der Vereenigde Nederlanden en de keurvorstkoning George I. (Bijdragen v. vaderl. gesch. 4e Reeks, dl. I).

1900. The United Provinces and George I of England. (Bijdr. v. vaderl. gesch. en oudhk. 4e Ser. 1, III-IV).

1900. De Triple Alliantie. (Bijdragen v. vaderl. gesch. 4e Reeks, dl. 2).

1901. De arrestatie van Gyllenborg en Görtz in 1717 te Arnhem. (Tijdschr. v. Gesch., Land- en Volkenk. 1901). [Reviewed by Th. Westrin, Svenska Historisk Tidskrift 1901, p. 61].

1902. Aanteekeningen van J.A. van de Perre de Nieuwerve over de acte van verbintenis en de dankadressen in Zeeland, 1789. (Bijdr. & Meded. Hist. Gen. XXIII, p. 465).

1902. Geschiedenis van het Postwezen in Nederland vóór 1795. (Ned. Spectator, 1902: 313). [Reviewed by J. Overvoorde's Gesch. v.h. Postw.].

1904. De opleiding der historici in Nederland. (Verslagen ledenverg. Hist. Gen.). [Followed by discussion with P.J. Blok i.d. Spectator. Blok: Spect. 1903, pp. 301 and 314; Bussemaker: Spect. 1903, pp. 306 and 325. See also Museum X, 382].

1905. Verslag van een voorloopig onderzoek te Lissabon, Sevilla, Madrid, Escorial, Simancas en Brussel naar Archivalia belangrijk voor de geschiedenis van Nederland op last der regeering ingesteld. 's-Gravenhage, 1905.

1905. Over de waardeering der feiten in geschiedvorsching en geschiedschrijving. Oration Leiden. Groningen 1905.

1906. De voorbereiding van de Generale Unie. (Eerste gedeelte van de Afscheiding der Waalsche gewesten. Hist. Leesboek, collected by H. Brugmans, 1906, 148).

1907. Lijst van ambten en officiën ter begeving staande van burgemeesters van Amsterdam in 1749. (Bijdr. en Meded. Hist. Gen. XXVIII, 1907, 474).

1907. Iets over de ambassade van d'Affry (1755). (Hist. Avonden, II, 55).

1907. Denkwürdigkeiten des Fürsten Chlodwich zu Hohenlohe-Schillingsfürst. (Onze Eeuw 1907, Jrg. 7, 446).

1908. Uittreksels uit de Brieven van d'Affry aan de Fransche Regeering (1755-1762). (Bijdr. & Meded. Hist. Gen. XXVII, 269). Medegedeeld uit de nalatenschap van Robert Fruin.

1908. Uit de Briefwisseling van Koningin Victoria. (Onze Eeuw 1908, Jrg. 8, 243, 321).

1908-14. Archives ou Correspondence inédite de la Maison d'Orange-Nassau. 4e Série. 4 Tomes. Leyde, 1908–14 . 1909. Een memorie over de Republiek uit 1728. (Bijdr. en Meded. Hist. Gen. XXX: 96).

1909. Abraham Lincoln. (Onze Eeuw, 1909, IV, 43, 221).

1910. De onechtheid van het zoogenaamd verdrag tusschen de Republiek en den keurvorst van Beieren van Augustus 1698. (Handel. & Meded. Mij Ned. Lett. Leiden, 1909–10, p. 147).

1911. Het halve eeuwgetij van het koninkrijk Italië. (Groene Amsterdammer, 2 April 1911).

1911. Jeanne d'Arc. (Onze Eeuw, 1911, IV, 43, 177).

1911. Uit onzen Bloeitijd. IIIe Serie no. 2. Baarn, 1911. De Handel.

1912. Muller, P.L., Geschiedenis van onzen tijd sedert 1848. Voortgezet door W.H. de Beaufort en Th. Bussemaker. Dl. III, 1e St. Haarlem 1912.

1912. De gewaande onderhandelingen der Engelsche Regeering in 1813 over de stichting van een Welfenrijk van de Elbe tot de Schelde. (Hand. & Meded. Mij Ned. Lett. 1911-12, p. 143).

1913. Bakhuizen van den Brink (R.C.), Studiën en Schetsen over vaderlandsche geschiedenis en letteren. Dl. V, published by S. Muller Fz. and C.H. Th. Bussemaker. 's-Gravenhage [1913].

1914. John Bright. (Onze Eeuw, 1914, I, 350; II, 44).

Bussemaker contributed to the Nieuw Biografisch Woordenboek (1911-1914) the following vitae: I. Joh. de Back, Ch. J. Bentinck, W. Bentinck, A. Heinsius.

II. Corns. Hop (2), Hend. Hop, Joh. Hop, Ad. Hen. v. Rechteren, J.H. Ripperda.

III. F. Fagel (4), Hen. Fagel (2), B.P.S.A.v. Gronsfeld, Jac. Hop.

== Notes and references ==
=== Sources ===
- S.B.J. Zilverberg (1979). "Bussemaker, Carel Hendrik Theodoor (1864-1914), in Biografisch Woordenboek van Nederland". Huygens KNAW (in Dutch).
- J. Tollebeek (1990). ""Bussemakers kritiek: de waardering van de feiten", in: De toga van Fruin: Denken over geschiedenis in Nederland sinds 1860". Digitale Bibliotheek der Nederlandse Letteren (in Dutch). pp. 105–114.
- H. Brugmans (1916). "Levensbericht van Carel Hendrik Theodoor Bussemaker, in Jaarboek van de Maatschappij der Nederlandse Letterkunde". Digitale Bibliotheek der Nederlandse Letteren (in Dutch). pp. 18–58.
