= Pacification of Ghent =

1576 alliance of the provinces of the Habsburg Netherlands

The Pacification of Ghent was an alliance between the provinces of the Habsburg Netherlands signed on 8 November 1576. The main objectives were to remove Spanish mercenaries who had made themselves hated by all sides due to their plundering, and to promote a formal peace with the rebellious provinces of Holland and Zeeland.

== Background ==
In 1566, the Habsburg Netherlands experienced considerable political upheaval and civil unrest, which culminated in the Beeldenstorm (or "iconoclastic fury") of that year. Its ruler, Philip II of Spain, responded by appointing Fernando Álvarez de Toledo, 3rd Duke of Alba as Governor-general. He arrived there in 1567 to restore order, accompanied by an army of mercenaries. Philip soon replaced the most important advisors to former regent Margaret of Parma, either by summarily executing those such as the counts of Egmont and Hoorn, or by driving them into exile, as he did to William of Orange (also known as "William the Silent"). The leader of the royalist faction, Philippe III de Croÿ remained in favor.

Alba had little initial difficulty in repelling the rebel military incursions, led by William. However, maintaining a large military presence put severe strain on the royal finances, especially because Spain was fighting expensive wars against the Ottoman Sultan and in Italy at the same time. Alba's attempts to finance these expenses by new taxes in the Netherlands also estranged previously loyal subjects from the royalist cause. Then, in 1572, a group of privateers with letters of marque from William (known as watergeuzen) were unexpectedly successful in an invasion into Holland and Zeeland. Orange was able to take over the government in these two provinces under the guise of his old post of royal Stadtholder, and brought them into open revolt against the government in Brussels. This brought about a formal state of war between Holland and Zeeland and the fifteen loyalist provinces.

This civil war was mostly fought with mercenary troops on both sides, with Spanish tercios playing a preponderant role on the royalist side. Because of the dire state of the royal finances, these Spanish mercenaries often went unpaid. Consequently, they frequently mutinied and pillaged nearby towns, especially following victories. The disaffection this caused among the citizenry toward the Brussels government eventually was brought to a boil in the summer of 1576.

== Pacification ==
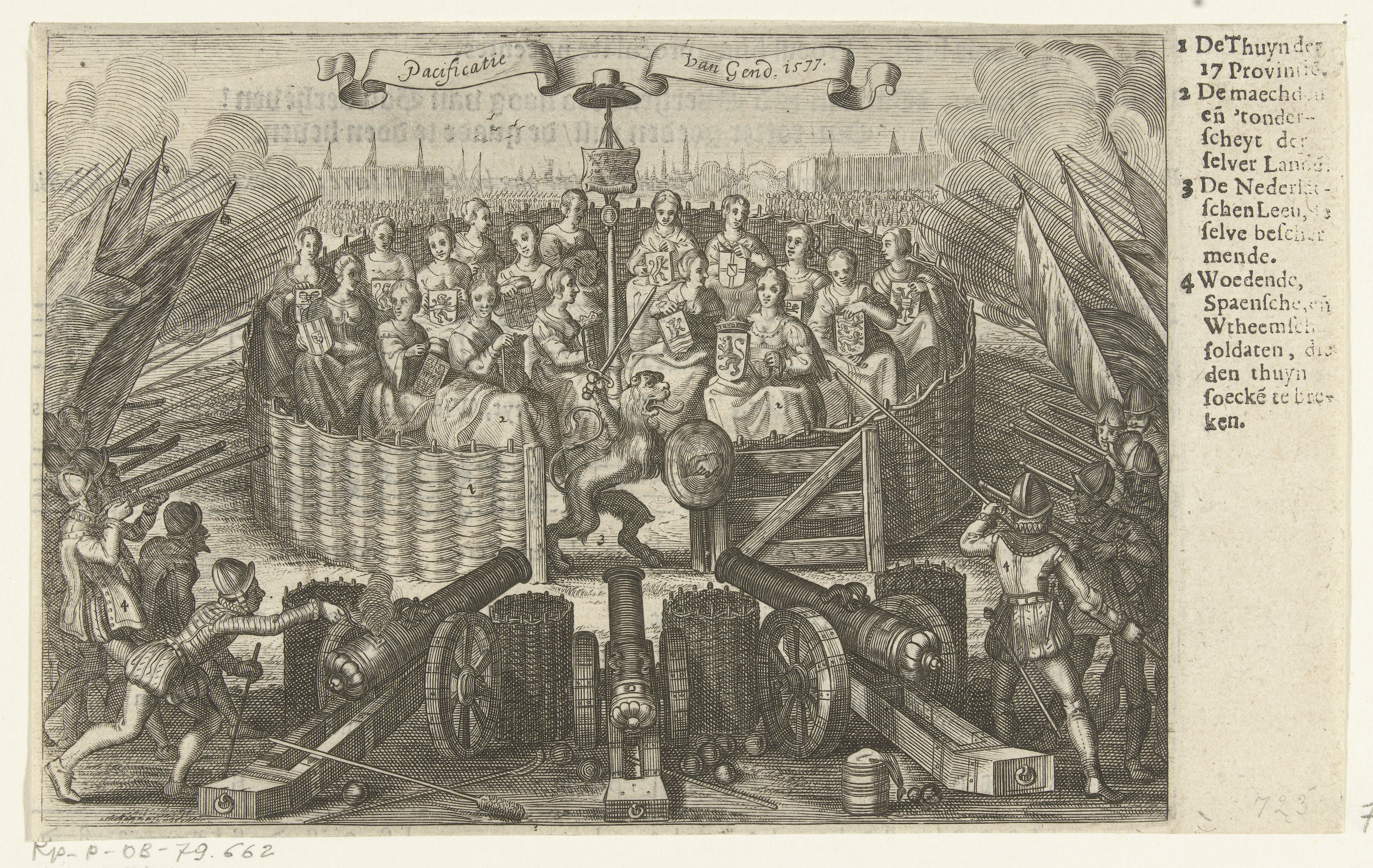
Allegory depicting the Pacification of Ghent by Adriaen van de Venne (Nederlandtsche gedenck-clanck 1626). The picture shows the Netherlandish Lion defending the entrance to the Garden of the Netherlands where 17 Netherlandish Maidens personifying the Seventeen Provinces are seated, while surrounded by 'furious Spanish and foreign soldiers seeking to breach the garden'.

In 1573, meanwhile, Alba had been replaced by Luis de Zúñiga y Requesens as governor-general. Requesens was also unable to defeat the rebels. He was in bad health and died in March 1576. This caused a power vacuum in the Brussels government, as the slow communications of the day prevented a speedy replacement from Madrid. Philip appointed his younger brother Don Juan (also known as John of Austria) governor-general, but it took him several months to take up this appointment.

During this interim period, the Duke of Aerschot stepped into power. He had already held inconclusive peace talks with Orange, his former colleague in the Raad van State (Council of State). When Spanish troops mutinied because of lack of payment and sacked the towns of Zierikzee and Aalst, the States General of the Netherlands was immediately convened by the States of Brabant and County of Hainaut on 8 September 1576 to deal with the mutinous troops. Holland and Zeeland, as rebellious provinces, were not invited. Aerschot, acting in the usurpation of the royal prerogatives, had by then been appointed as head of the Council of State by the States General. This made him acting governor-general. This action was comparable to what Orange had done in Holland and Zeeland, in which royal authority had been usurped by rebels pretending to act "in the name of the king".

The States General referred to precedent to justify their actions. They had acted similarly after the deaths of Charles the Bold in 1477 and Philip I of Castile in 1506. Now they authorized the provincial states to raise troops to defend against marauding foreign (especially Spanish) mercenaries.

More importantly from the perspective of constitutional history, the States General also embarked on a program of institutional innovation. Previously, the States General only were in session for a few weeks at most. To facilitate its governance in permanent session, they appointed a rotating presidency. The president, selected from one of the provincial delegations, assisted by one or two of the pensionaries, would preside over the meetings for a week at a time. This system continued during the later Dutch Republic and the pensionaries began acting as an executive committee of the States General.

The first order of business for the States General was to bring about peace with the rebel provinces so as to form a common front against the marauding mutineers, the hatred of whom united rebel and loyalist alike. The States General appointed a committee to negotiate with the Prince of Orange and the provinces of Holland and Zeeland. Because the Prince's troops were already invading the province of Flanders, where they were made welcome in the rebellious city of Ghent, the negotiations were held there.

The delegates met in the first week of October 1576. The rebels were represented by Paulus Buys, Grand Pensionary of Holland, and Philips of Marnix, lord of Sint-Aldegonde; the States General sent Elbertus Leoninus, a professor at Leuven University, among others. These negotiators had already met during the abortive negotiations at Breda the previous year and therefore knew the main stumbling blocks to reaching agreement. They also knew that speed was essential, as King's brother, Don Juan, was to arrive in Luxembourg in early November, and it would be easier to reach agreement if the "royalist" side was not encumbered by his control.

The delegates reached an agreement on 30 October, in less than three weeks time. Its ratification by the States General on 8 November 1576 was undoubtedly hastened by the sack of Antwerp by Spanish mutineers on 4 November, which helped sway many toward ratification.

The preamble of the treaty held the previous Spanish government in Brussels responsible for the war. The provinces of the Netherlands agreed to jointly drive out the Spaniards and their supporters "to restore the citizens to their rights, privileges, and liberties and their former prosperity".

Article 1 provided for a general amnesty for acts on both sides after the troubles started in 1568. Article 3 provided that, "once the Spaniards had been driven out", the States General would return the country into the hands of the King, decide the contentious issue of religion, and return all military installations taken by the rebels to the authority of the king. In article 5, they declared that all placards by Alba for the suppression of heresy were revoked, and nobody would be punished for religious offenses before the States General decided the matter of religion. Article 4 provided that, outside Holland and Zeeland, no action against the Catholic religion was to be allowed. The remaining articles dealt with such issues as the free movement of goods and persons, the freeing of prisoners of war, the return of confiscated properties (especially those of the Prince of Orange), the reimbursement of the Prince for his expenses in the conduct of the war against the government troops before 1572, and the problems caused by the need to equalize the inflated currency in Holland and Zeeland with that in the other provinces.

The Pacification bore the aspects of both a peace treaty between rebellious and "loyal" provinces, and a step toward for a further defensive union. That initiative was concluded on 9 January 1577 by the (first) Union of Brussels.

== Aftermath ==
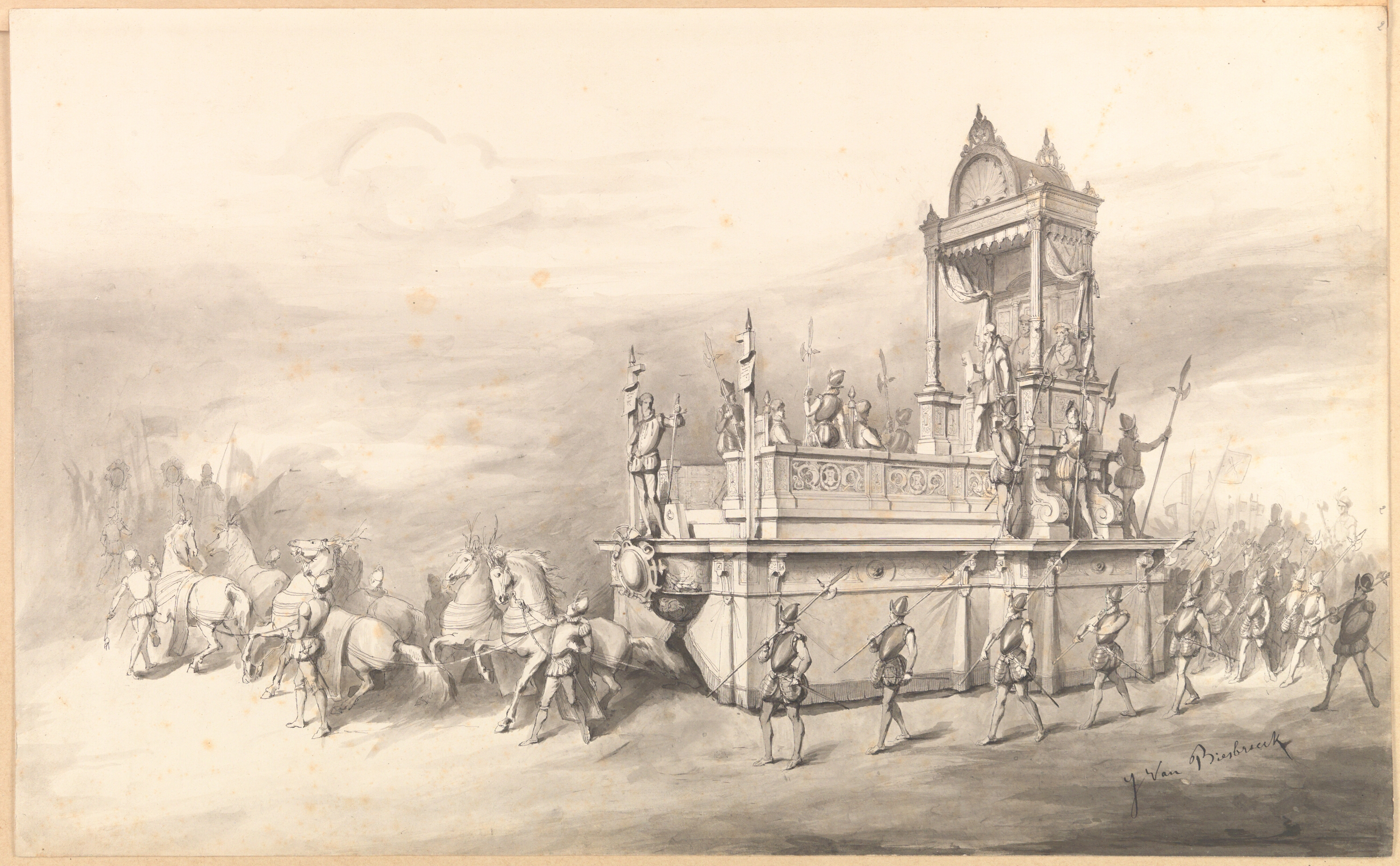
Sketch depicting the historical procession in honour of the Pacification of Ghent.

The problem with the Pacification was that the provinces agreed on little, other than the need to confront the marauding mutineers. Once that problem had been solved by the withdrawal of the Spanish tercios to Italy in April 1577, the provinces started to diverge again.

Don Juan signed the Pacification on 12 February 1577, thereby apparently giving royal assent to it. He took care, however, to stress the clauses about maintaining the Catholic religion outside the provinces of Holland and Zeeland. The States General then accepted him as the legitimate governor-general and even agreed to pay the arrears of the royal troops, the refusal of which had arguably been the cause of the problems with the mutineers. This agreement was enshrined in the Edict of 1577.

However, the Edict of 1577 seemed to provide for a return to the status quo ante in which the States General would not be permanently in session. Holland and Zeeland protested against this arrangement and refused to submit to it. Neither would they give up the fortresses they had occupied, as provided for in the Pacification. The relations between the new governor-general and the States General also soon deteriorated. The States-General even appointed its own governor-general, the Archduke Matthias.

In 1579, Alessandro Farnese became the royalist governor-general. He immediately offered to return to the southern Catholic nobles their original privileges. With the Spanish army under control and their local liberties returned, the Walloon nobles and southern provinces no longer had any reason to rebel. However, the northern, Calvinist-controlled provinces were as unwilling to give up the practice of their religion as Philip II had agreed. The French-speaking provinces thereby concluded the Union of Arras, prompting the northern provinces to answer with their own Union of Utrecht. These two agreements produced a split in the Habsburg Netherlands, never to be reconciled. The legacy of this is the two current kingdoms of Belgium and the Netherlands.

== See also ==
- List of treaties
