= Siege of Nijmegen =

- Assault on Nijmegen (1589), Maarten Schenk van Nydeggen fails to take the city by surprise during the Eighty Years' War
- Siege of Nijmegen (1591), Maurice, Prince of Orange takes the city during the Eighty Years' War
- Siege of Nijmegen (1794), French Revolutionary forces commanded by Jean Victor Marie Moreau take the city from the Dutch Republic (ruled by William V, Prince of Orange) during the War of the First Coalition
- Bombing of Nijmegen (February 1944), American aircraft bomb the city as part of the Big Week during World War II
- Battle of Nijmegen (September 1944), American and British troops capture the city and its two vital bridges as part of Operation Market Garden during World War II

== See also ==
- Timeline of Nijmegen
