= Siege of Rheinberg (1586–1590) =

1590 siege

- Part of the Eighty Years' War, the Cologne War and Anglo-Spanish War (1585–1604)
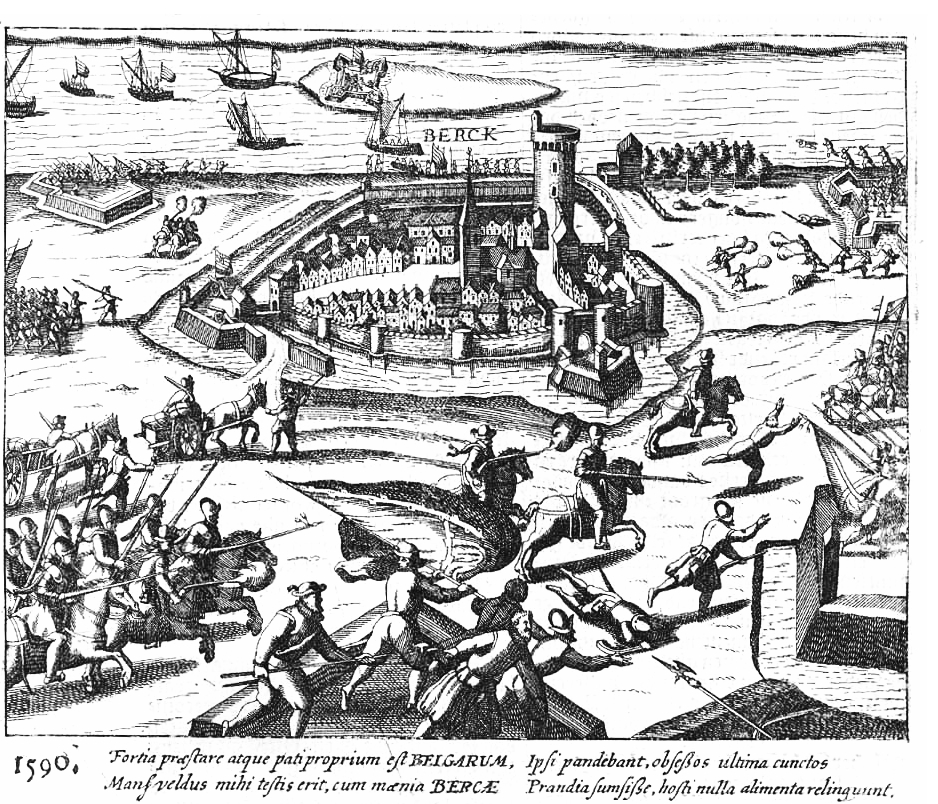
- The Siege of Rheinberg of 1590 by Peter Ernst von Mansfeld.
Date	13 August 1586 – 3 February 1590
Location	Rheinberg (present-day Germany)
Result	Spanish victory

Belligerents
States-General (until 1588); Dutch Republic (from 1588); England; Electorate of Cologne (Gebhard Truchsess)	Spain

Commanders and leaders
(Dutch Republic) Maarten Schenck (Kingdom of England) Francis Vere (From 1590)	(Spain) Duke of Parma (Spain) Count of Mansfeld

The siege of Rheinberg 1586–1590, also known as the capture of Rheinberg of 1590, took place at the strategic Cologne enclave of Rheinberg (present-day North Rhine-Westphalia, Germany), one of the principal crossing-points over the Rhine on the stretch between the Electorate of Cologne and the Dutch border, between 13 August 1586 and 3 February 1590, during the Eighty Years' War, the Cologne War, and the Anglo-Spanish War (1585–1604). After an initial siege in 1586, and a long blocking by the Spanish forces until September 1589, Don Alexander Farnese, Duke of Parma (Spanish: Alejandro Farnesio), commander-in-chief of the Spanish army, sent a substantial force, under Peter Ernst, Count of Mansfeld, to besiege Rheinberg. Despite the efforts by Maarten Schenck van Nydeggen (until his death at the Assault on Nijmegen on 10 August 1589), and Sir Francis Vere (from 1590), to relieve the fortress city, the Protestant garrison finally surrendered to the Spaniards on 3 February 1590.

On 19 August 1597 the Dutch army led by Maurice of Nassau captured Rheinberg for the States in his successful campaign of 1597, but the following year the Spanish Army of Flanders led by Don Francisco de Mendoza retook the strategic place, forcing the garrison to surrender.

== See also ==
- Cologne War
- Army of Flanders
- Destruction of Neuss
- Assault on Nijmegen (1589)
- List of Archbishop-Electors of Cologne
