= Battle of Gembloux (1578) =

Battle during the Eighty Years' War

- Part of the Eighty Years' War
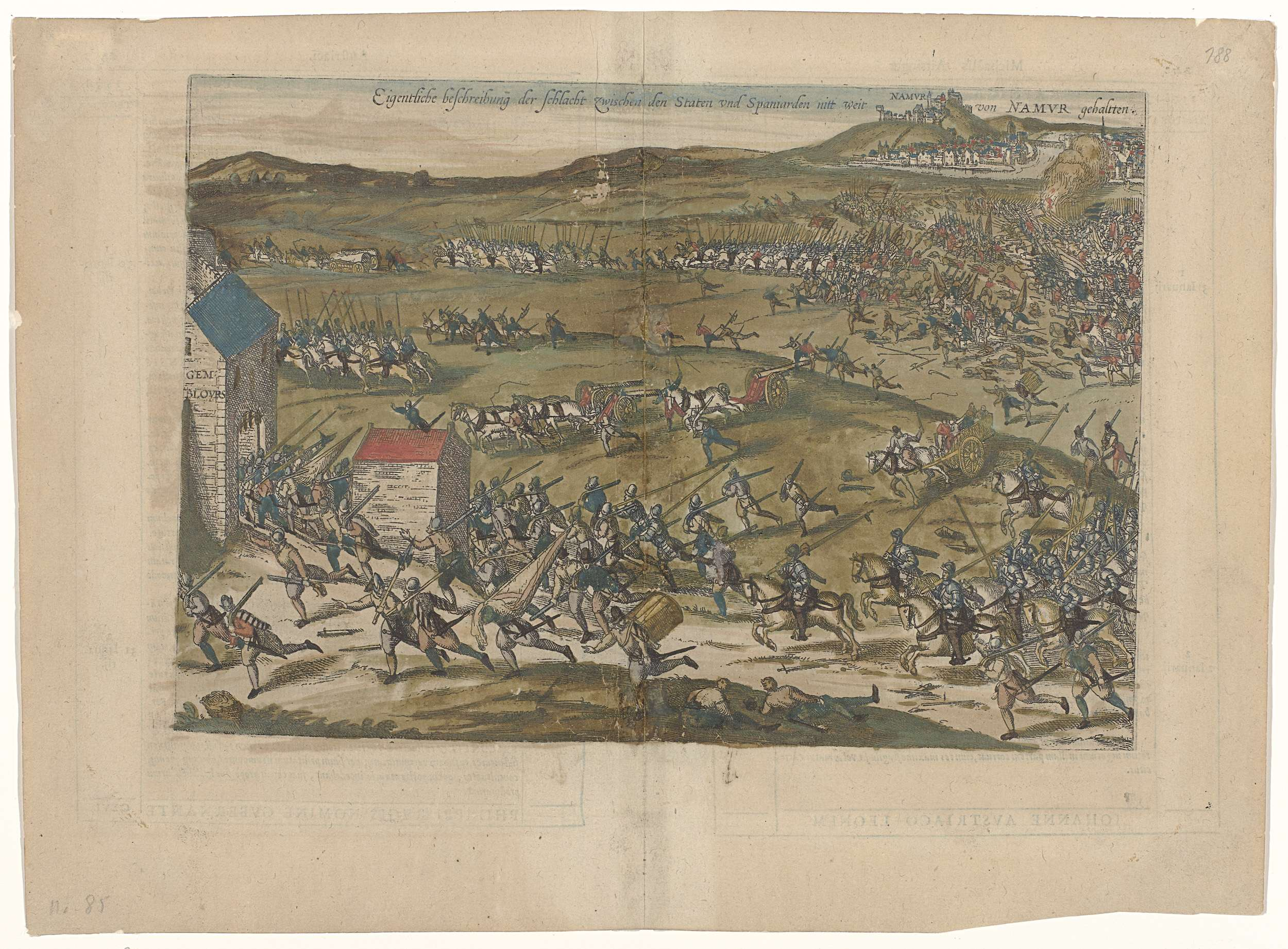
- Engraving of the Battle of Gembloux by Georg Braun
Date	31 January 1578
Location	Gembloux, Brabant, Spanish Netherlands (present-day Belgium) 50.55°N 4.75°E
Result	Spanish victory

Belligerents
(Dutch Republic) States-General	Spain

Commanders and leaders
(Dutch Republic) Antoine de Goignies (POW) (Dutch Republic) Count of Boussu (Dutch Republic) William de La Marck (Dutch Republic) Martin Schenck (Dutch Republic) Emanuel Philibert de Lalaing (Dutch Republic) Count of Egmont (Dutch Republic) Marquis d’Havré (Dutch Republic) Henry Balfour	(Spain) John of Austria (Spain) Alexander Farnese (Spain) Cristóbal de Mondragón (Spain) Ottavio Gonzaga (Spain) Count of Mansfeld (Spain) Francisco Verdugo

Strength
20,000 men	17,000–20,000 (Only engaged 1,200 cavalry in the first phase of the battle)

Casualties and losses
6,000 killed	12 killed

The Battle of Gembloux took place at Gembloux, near Namur, Low Countries, between the Spanish forces led by Don John of Austria (Spanish: Don Juan de Austria), Governor-General of the Spanish Netherlands, and a rebel army under Antoine de Goignies, during the Eighty Years' War.

On 31 January 1578 the Spanish cavalry commanded by John's nephew, Don Alexander Farnese, Prince of Parma (Italian: Alessandro Farnese, Spanish: Alejandro Farnesio), after pushing back the Netherlandish cavalry, attacked the Netherlandish army, causing an enormous panic amongst the rebel troops. The result was a crushing victory for the Spanish forces. The battle hastened the disintegration of the unity of the rebel provinces, and meant the end of the Union of Brussels.

== Prelude ==
After the Sack of Antwerp by Spanish mutineers on 4 November 1576, Catholics and Protestants of the Low Countries concluded the Pacification of Ghent, to remove all Spanish troops. The Spanish tercios were in fact withdrawn to Italy in April 1577, after the new Governor-General of the Spanish Netherlands, the famous Christian knight, and half-brother of Philip II of Spain, Don John of Austria (victor of Lepanto), had signed the Perpetual Edict.

However, in the summer of 1577, Don John (brandishing the motto In hoc signo vici Turcos, in hoc vincam haereticos—"in this sign I conquered the Turks, in this I shall conquer the heretics") began planning for a new campaign against the Netherlandish rebels, and in July 1577 he took the Citadel of Namur by surprise without a fight. This action further destabilized the uneasy alliance between Catholics and Protestants. From December 1577, John of Austria, still based in Luxembourg, received reinforcements from Spanish Lombardy: some 9,000 battle-hardened Spanish troops under Don Alexander Farnese, Prince of Parma (Duke after the death of his father, Ottavio Farnese, Duke of Parma, in September 1586), complemented by 4,000 troops from Lorraine under Peter Ernst, Count of Mansfeld, and local Walloon troops from Luxembourg and Namur. By January 1578, he had between 17,000 and 20,000 men at his disposal.

The Union of Brussels had 25,000 fighting men, but these troops were badly equipped and led, and above all very diverse: Dutch, Flemish, English, Scottish, Walloon, German, and French, and religiously ranging from staunch Catholics to zealous Calvinists.

== Battle of Gembloux ==
In the last days of January 1578, the Dutch army was camped between Gembloux and Namur, with around 20,000 soldiers. The army was in bad shape, with many sick. Its leaders, George de Lalaing, Count of Rennenberg, Philip de Lalaing, Robert de Melun, and Valentin de Pardieu, were absent because they attended the wedding of the Baron of Beersel and Marguerite de Mérode in Brussels. The command of the army was in the hands of Antoine de Goignies, Seigneur de Vendege. Other notable commanders of the Netherlandish army were the Count of Boussu, Martin Schenck (who after the defeat at Gembloux, enlisted in the Army of Flanders), Emanuel Philibert de Lalaing, Philip, Count of Egmont, William II de La Marck, Lord of Lumey, and Charles Philippe de Croÿ, Marquis d’Havré.

When De Goignies learned that the Spanish army was approaching Namur, he decided to withdraw to Gembloux.

=== Parma's action ===
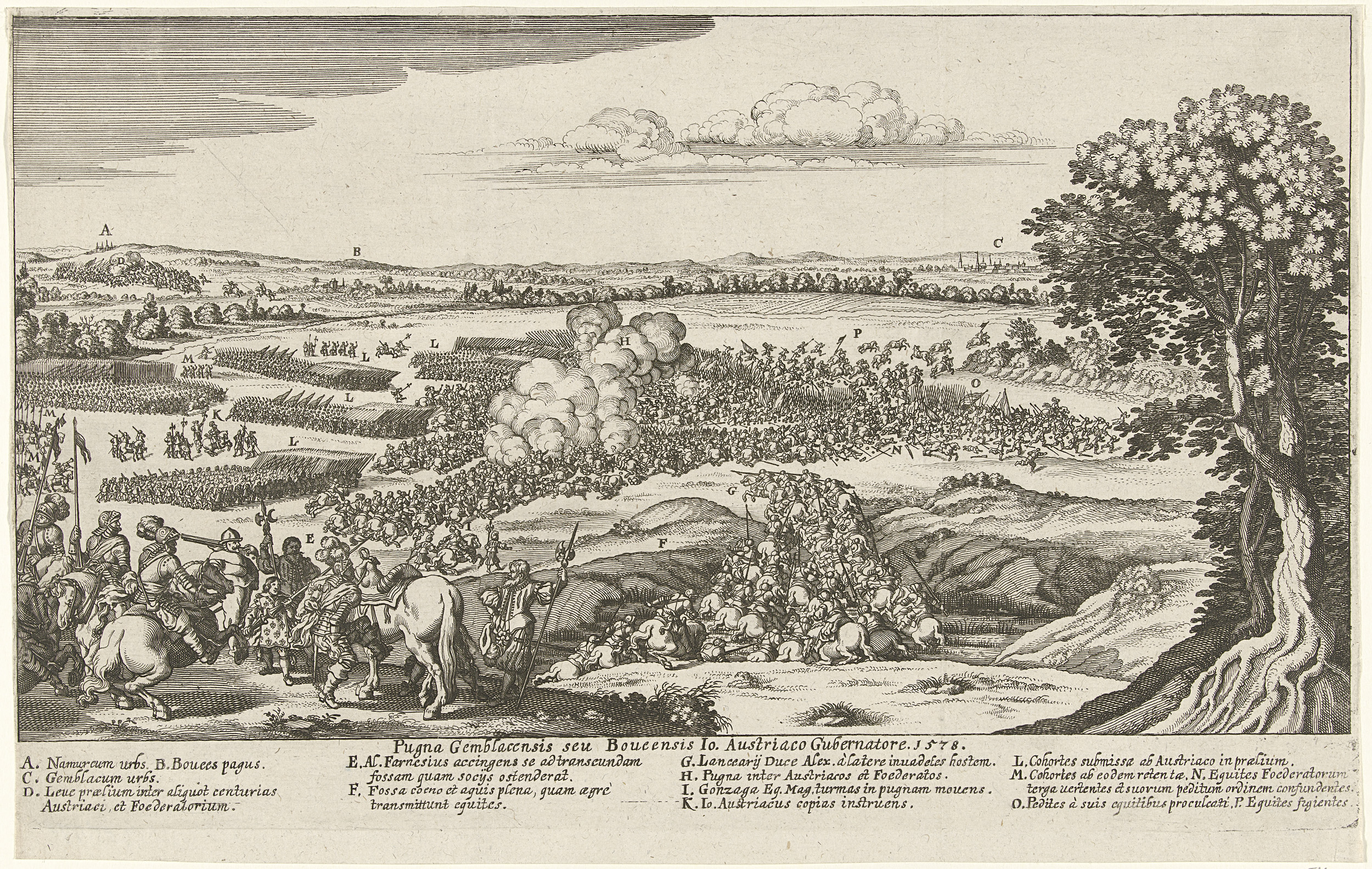
The Battle of Gembloux by Johann Wilhelm Baur

At dawn on 31 January, the Spanish army marched towards the rebel army, with the cavalry under Ottavio Gonzaga in the vanguard, followed by musketeers and infantry commanded by Don Cristóbal de Mondragón, and then the bulk of the army led by Don John of Austria and Don Alexander Farnese. The rearguard was commanded by the Count of Mansfeld.

The Spanish cavalry crossed the Meuse River and made contact with the rear of the withdrawing rebel army. With the bulk of the Spanish army still south of the Meuse, John sent messages to his cavalry, now commanded by Alexander, not to approach the enemy too closely until the arrival of rest of the Spanish force. However, the cavalry advanced so fast and so far that they would not be able to safely withdraw. Alexander saw an opportunity to surprise the rebels and launched a cavalry charge after seeing the poor state of the enemy forces. After several clashes with the Netherlandish rearguard cavalry, the Spanish routed them, and they fled towards the main body of the Netherlandish army, causing an enormous panic amongst those troops. Most of the rebel army disintegrated, with Parma's cavalry cutting down many soldiers as they fled.

=== Destruction of the states-general's army ===
The Netherlandish army tried to regroup, but a cannon and its ammunition blew up, causing many deaths and renewed panic. Meanwhile, part of the rebel troops, mostly Dutch and Scots led by Colonel Henry Balfour, tried to take defensive positions, but could not withstand the musketeers and pikemen led by John, Mondragón, and Gonzaga. The Spanish victory was complete. De Goignies and a large number of his officers were captured, along with thirty-four flags and banners and all the artillery and baggage of the Netherlandish army. 6,000 rebel soldiers where killed, with hundreds of prisoners. The Spanish casualties, however, were minimal, with a claim of only 12 dead and a few wounded. Around 3,000 rebels reached Gembloux and closed the gates, but after negotiations they surrendered to the Spanish on 5 February, sparing the city from a sack.

== Aftermath ==
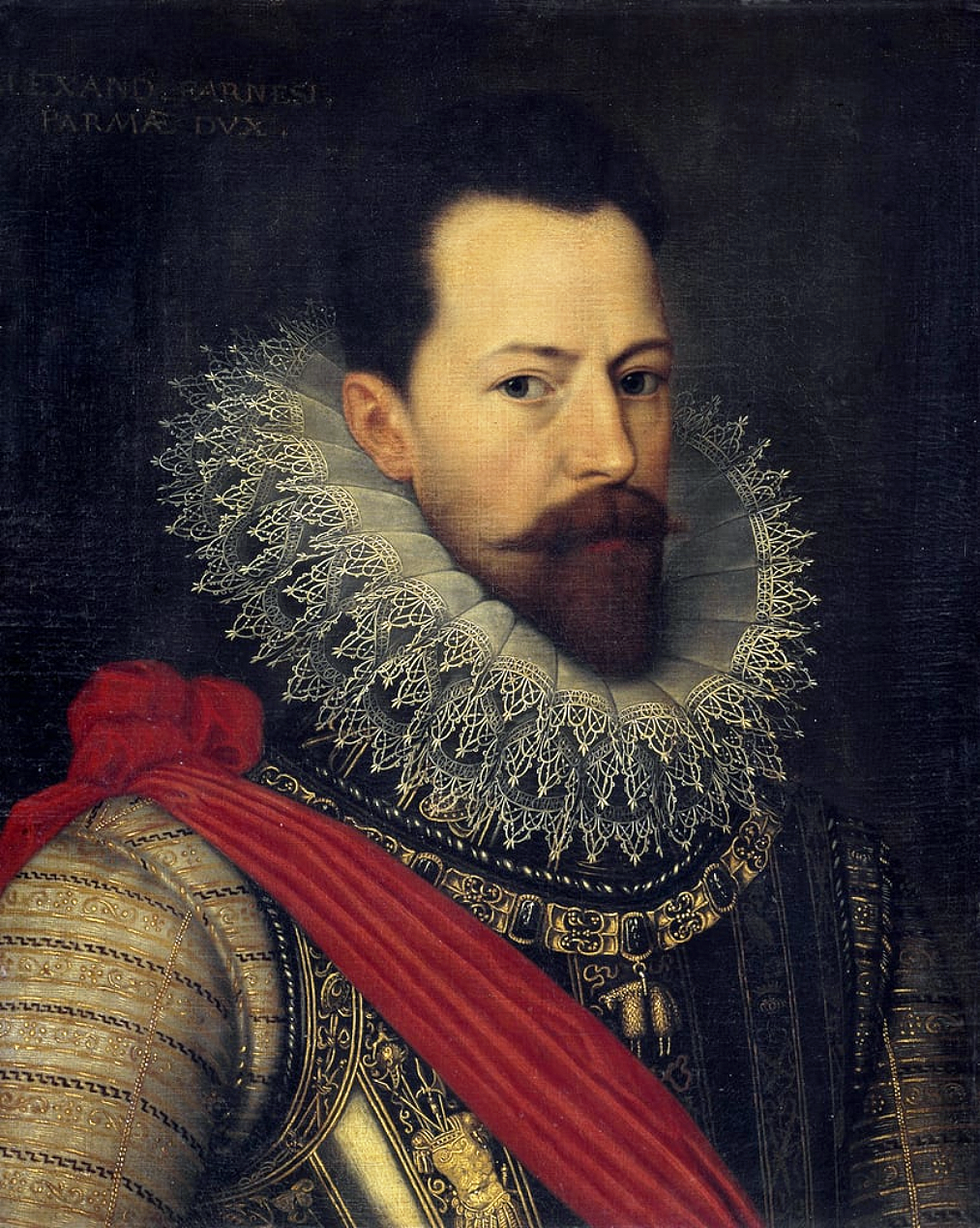
Portrait of Don Alexander Farnese by Otto van Veen

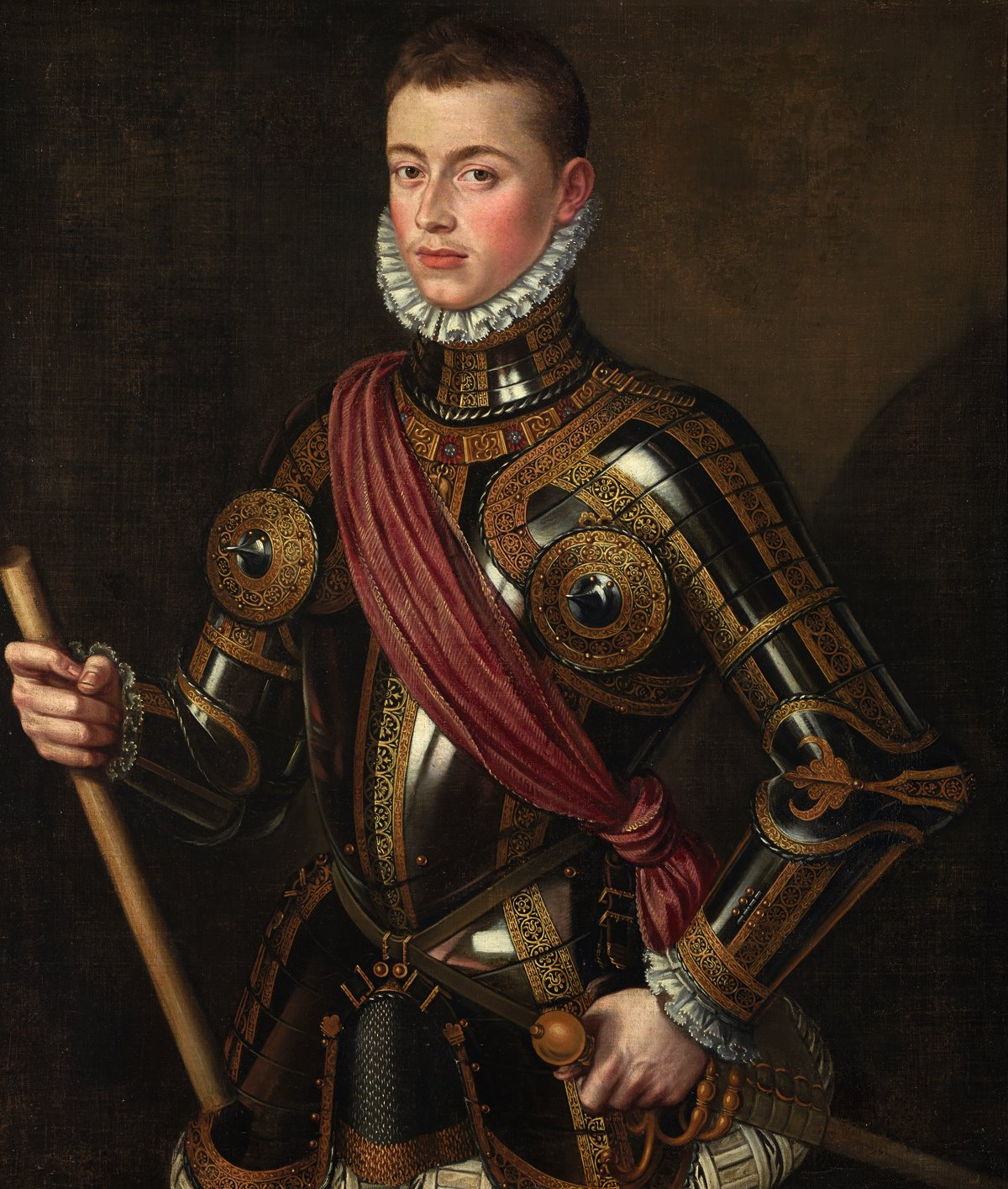
Portrait of Don John of Austria, Governor-General of the Spanish Netherlands

The defeat at Gembloux led to military pressure on Brussels, causing the States General of the Netherlands to leave and move to Antwerp. Prince William of Orange, the leader of the revolt, also left, along with its nominal governor, Matthias of Austria (the future Holy Roman Emperor), who had accepted the position of governor-general by the states-general, although he was not recognized by his uncle, Philip II of Spain. The victory of John also meant the end of the Union of Brussels, and hastened the disintegration of the unity of the rebel provinces.

John died nine months after the battle, probably from typhus, on 1 October 1578. He was succeeded by Farnese as governor-general (last desire of John that Philip II confirmed), who at the head of the Spanish army reconquered large parts of the Low Countries in the following years.

On 6 January 1579, the provinces loyal to the Spanish Monarchy signed the defensive Union of Arras, expressed their loyalty to Philip II and recognized Farnese as Governor-General of the Netherlands. In contrast, the provinces loyal to the Protestant cause signed the defensive Union of Utrecht.

== See also ==
- List of dukes of Parma
- List of governors of the Spanish Netherlands
