= Maarten Schenck van Nydeggen =

Dutch military commander

Maarten Schenck van Nydegen
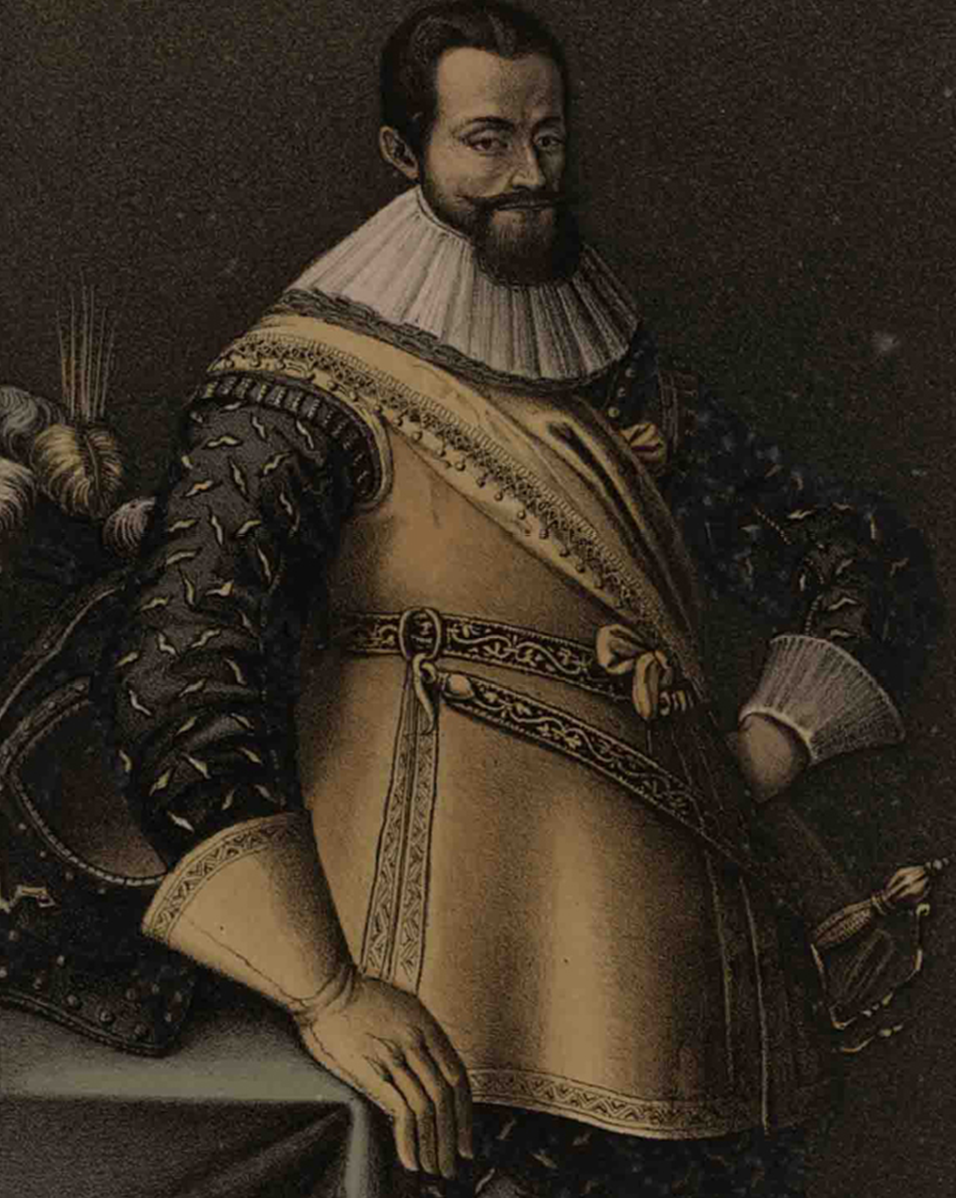
- Martin Schenck, soldier of fortune, 1540–1589.
- Born: circa 1543; Goch, Germany
- Died: † 11–August 1589 (aged c. 46); Nijmegen, the Netherlands
- Burial place: beheaded and quartered, no burial
- Military career
- Service years: circa 1555–-63, page to Christoffel van IJsselstein ca.1563–ca. 1570 Dutch Service, under William the Silent; Spanish Service, circa 1570-85; Dutch Service, 1585–86.
- Rank: Knight and Marshall of the Camp
- Conflicts: Battle of Gembloux 1578; Battle of Hardenburg Heath 1580; Sack of Westphalia and Battle of Werl 1586; Siege of Rheinberg 1588; Assault on Nijmegen 1589;

Maarten (Martin) Schenck van Nydeggen, (1540?, – 11 August 1589) was a military commander in the Netherlands.

He first served with William of Orange in the fight for Dutch independence from Spain then switched to serve with distinction in the Spanish army. In 1580 he changed his allegiance to the Dutch Republic and was declared Lord of Toutenburg in Gelderland, Knight and Marshall of the Camp by the Dutch States General.

He then served on the Protestant side in the Cologne War with some success until he drowned in the Waal in a failed attack on Nijmegen in 1588.

== Childhood and early career ==
Coat of Arms

Born at Goch in the Duchy of Cleves, as a child he served as a page for Christoffel van IJsselstein (or Ysselstein), and when he came of age, he joined the banner of William of Orange at the head of twenty–two men at arms, fighting in the Eighty Years' War.

By right of descent, he claimed a castle in Bleijenbeek, currently in northern Limburg, which was then a possession of his cousin. Although he took physical possession of the castle, the judiciary supported the cousin, and Schenck was forcibly dispossessed. He became unpopular in William's court and after the crushing defeat in the Battle of Gembloux in 1578, he made overtures to the Spanish, who enlisted him as a soldier in the Army of Flanders.
In the wars against the Dutch, he became known, and notorious, as the most daring and formidable Netherlander that wore Philip’s colors. On 15 June 1580, at the Battle of Hardenburg Heath, while still in the service of the Spanish, he outgeneralled and defeated Count Philip Hohenlohe, who lost 1500 soldiers, to 300 lost by Schenck. This battle preserved the city of Groningen for Philip. In the course of this campaign, he was captured twice, and held for ransom, and each time he escaped. Reportedly, he could eat, drink and sleep in the saddle, and his men followed him like dogs.

== Transfer to Dutch service and the Cologne War ==
Despite his fame, he was dissatisfied, because he felt the Spanish continually treated him with injustice and lack of faith. Lewes Lewknor wrote of Schenck's dissatisfaction, 'Nothing ever more moved Skinke than the indignity of this dealing; and so telling the duke, that he would be loath, now he had spent all that ever he had in the Kings service, to be accounted a captain of freebooters, took his leave, bending his mind presently to revenge; and forthwith surprising Nuis by stratagem, delivered both the same, and the castle of Lemmicke, and withal, his own person, into the service of the States; of whom he was received with such honour as to a man of such worthiness belonged.'

On 25 May 1585, he declared his allegiance to the foundling Dutch Republic, which made him Lieutenant Governor of Gelderland and Marshall of Camp in the Dutch States Army. He received a salary of 1200 guilders a month. He resigned from his claim to the castle of Blynbeek, and he was reimbursed with other estates in Holland and Zeeland, and with 4000 florins. The next month, he and Adolf van Nieuwenaar were defeated by the Spanish general Juan Baptista de Tassis at the Battle of Amerongen on 23 June 1585. By spring the following year, he had adopted the cause of Gebhard Truchsess von Waldburg in his quest to keep the Electorate of Cologne, also called the Cologne War.

=== Sack of Westphalia ===
In March 1586, accompanied by Hermann Friedrich Cloedt, the commander of the fortified town of Neuss, Schenck went to the County of Westphalia at the head of 500 foot and 500 horse. After plundering Vest and Recklinghausen, on 18 March he captured Werl through trickery. He loaded a train of wagons with his soldiers and covered them with salt. When the wagons of salt were seen outside the city gates, they were at once admitted, salt being a valued commodity. The "salted soldiers" then over–powered the guard and captured the town. Some of the defenders escaped to the Werl citadel, which Schenck and his troops stormed in vain. When they could not capture the citadel, they thoroughly sacked the city. Count Claude de Berlaymont, also known as Haultpenne, collected his force of 4000 and besieged Schenck in Werl. Schenck and Cloedt were thus attacked from the outside, and from the several hundred guards in the Werl citadel. They loaded their wagons, this time with booty, took 30 magistrates as hostages, and attacked Haultpenne's force, killing about 500 of them, and losing 200 of their own. After fighting their way through Haultpenne's force, Cloedt returned to Neuss and Schenck to Venlo on the Meuse river, where Schenck left his fortune and his wife, while he journeyed to Delft. There, Robert Dudley knighted him by order of Elizabeth, and presented him with a chain valued at a thousand gold pieces.

Schenck had hardly returned from Delft when Alexander Farnese, Duke of Parma laid siege to Venlo. At night, Schenck and Roger Williams, a Welshman in Dutch service, took 130 English lancers and 30 of his own men. They passed through enemy lines, killed the guards and several of the soldiers, and reached the door of the Duke of Parma's tent, where they killed Parma's secretary and his personal guard. Afterward, Schenck and Williams made their way to Wachtendonk and Rheinberg, where he built a fortress, called Schenckenschanz, or Schenck's Fortification, at the confluence of the Waal and the Rhine. Williams and Schenck also reportedly took the castle of Kaisersworth in June 1586. The following summer, he and his men surprised the Spanish guard at the city of Bonn in the Electorate of Cologne, took the city, fortified it, and supplied it with food, but the Elector Gebhard von Waldburg, whose capital city this was, could not keep it, and after a six months' siege, it was retaken by the Spanish.

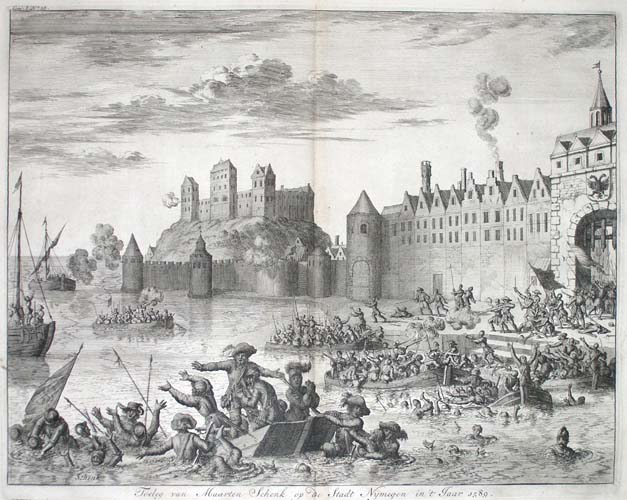
Martin Schenck drowns in the Waal River at Nijmegen, 10 August 1589.

== Assault on Nijmegen and death ==
By 1588, only Rheinberg remained outside the Spanish grasp, and in an effort to salvage the last major garrison in the electorate of Cologne for Gebhard Truchsess von Waldburg, Schenck intercepted and defeated seven companies of foot marching to Friesland, to reinforce Francisco Verdugo.
On the evening of 10 August, he and 20 barges of men made their way down the Waal to Nijmegen, where they planned to enter the city through windows overlooking the river. The swollen river pushed more than half the barges past their destination; the house they chose to enter was the site of a wedding party, and the alarm was raised. The city's garrison and citizens turned out to fight off the marauders, and Schenck and his men were driven back. In an effort to escape, he jumped into the river, and drowned. His body was found a few days later; it was decapitated, his head placed on a pike, his body quartered, and exhibited at four gates.

== Citations ==
This article incorporates information from the articles in the Netherlands and the German Wikipedias.
