= Christoffel van IJsselstein =

Christoffel van IJsselstein (died after 1510) was the illegitimate son of Frederik of Egmont, Count of Buren and Leerdam, Lord of IJsselstein (died 1521), and an unknown mother.

He was appointed as bailiff of Sint-Maartensdijk and Scherpenisse by his father and is cited as such in 1500 and 1505.

He and his descendants bore the Egmond arms quartered with those of IJsselstein.

By his marriage to Elisabeth van Renesse, he had the following children:

- Willem van IJsselstein (died in or before 1588), Sheriff (Dutch: drost) of Genemuiden; he married firstly Margriet Joostdr van Wijngaarden, and secondly Elisabeth Becker, with both of whom he left progeny. A son by his first wife, Christoffel van IJsselstein (died 1593), was a Lieutenant-General (1579) in the forces of the United Provinces during the Eighty Years' War and acted as Governor of Geertruidenberg (1573–75) and Heusden (1588).
- Fransken van IJsselstein, married Coenraat van Diepholt (died 1572), Marshal of the Nether-Bishopric of Utrecht and Montfoort, Castellan of Abcoude.
