= Union of Brussels =

Dutch political entities in the 1570s

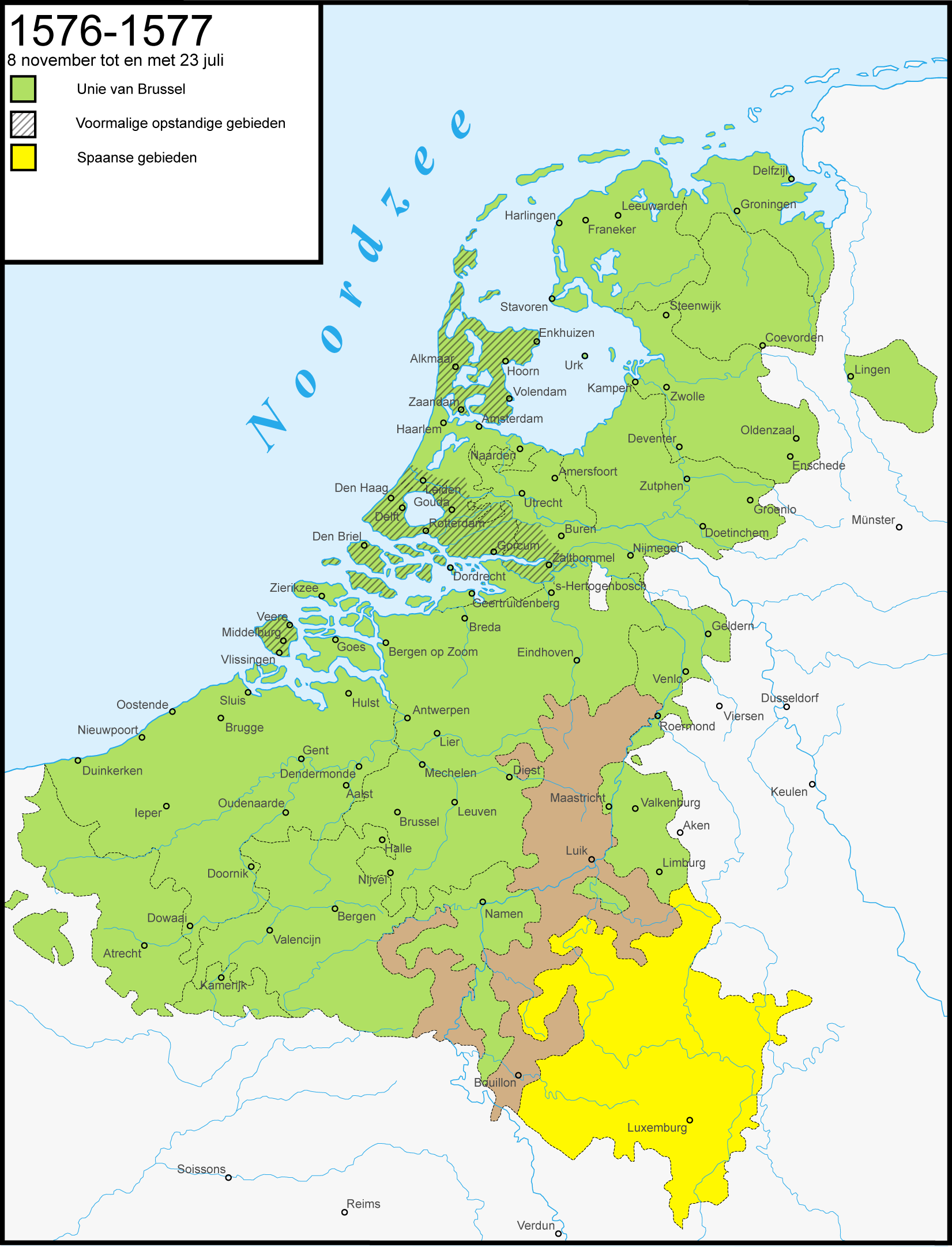
Union of Brussels 1577

There were two Unions of Brussels, both formed in the end of the 1570s, in the opening stages of the Eighty Years' War, the war of secession from Spanish control, which lasted from 1568 to 1648. Brussels was at that time the capital of the Spanish Netherlands.

== First Union of Brussels ==
The northern counties of Holland and Zeeland rebelled in 1572, when Calvinists took over control of most of the cities. The Spanish army tried to reconquer them but failed during the Siege of Leiden in 1574. In 1575 Philip II had to declare bankruptcy. As a result, the Spanish soldiers did not receive any payment, and they mutinied, pillaging the countryside of Brabant and Flanders and the city of Antwerp, where 10,000 inhabitants in a city with 100,000 people were killed by the Spanish soldiers, who sought to eliminate the local Protestant population.

This event enormously discredited the Spanish army. The Estates-General of the Netherlands, sitting in Brussels, wanted to end the war in 1577. However, some of the fervently Roman Catholic provincial Estates did not want to invite the Calvinists of Holland and Zeeland to join. The Estates-General, without Holland and Zeeland, founded the first Union of Brussels, which pledged to uphold the Catholic religion. Philip II of Spain, who ruled each of the provinces, agreed with this.

== Second Union of Brussels ==
The leader of the resistance, William of Orange, went to Brussels in 1577 to try to convince the General Estates to accept the Calvinist provincial Estates of Holland and Zeeland. The population of Brussels celebrated him as a hero, and it was with his urging that the General Estates accepted the two counties, now arguing for equal rights for Catholics and Protestants. Turmoil broke out in the Netherlands when the news spread throughout the realm. Calvinists took over the cities in Flanders and in other provinces of the Netherlands, but the estates of the eastern provinces did not accept this. The French-speaking provinces in the south founded the pro-Spanish Union of Arras in 1579, when their Protestant inhabitants were driven out. The Stadtholder of Groningen and Drenthe supported the king, and the city of Amsterdam did as well. The Calvinists had taken over most of the northern Netherlands, and created the Calvinist Union of Utrecht the same year. The Union of Brussels came to an end. Most of Brabant, including the city of Brussels, remained neutral. The General Estates, which were now dominated by Calvinists, fled from the Spanish army to Antwerp.
