= Eighty Years' War =

c. 1566/1568–1648 war in Habsburg Netherlands

Eighty Years' War Dutch Revolt
- Part of the European wars of religion
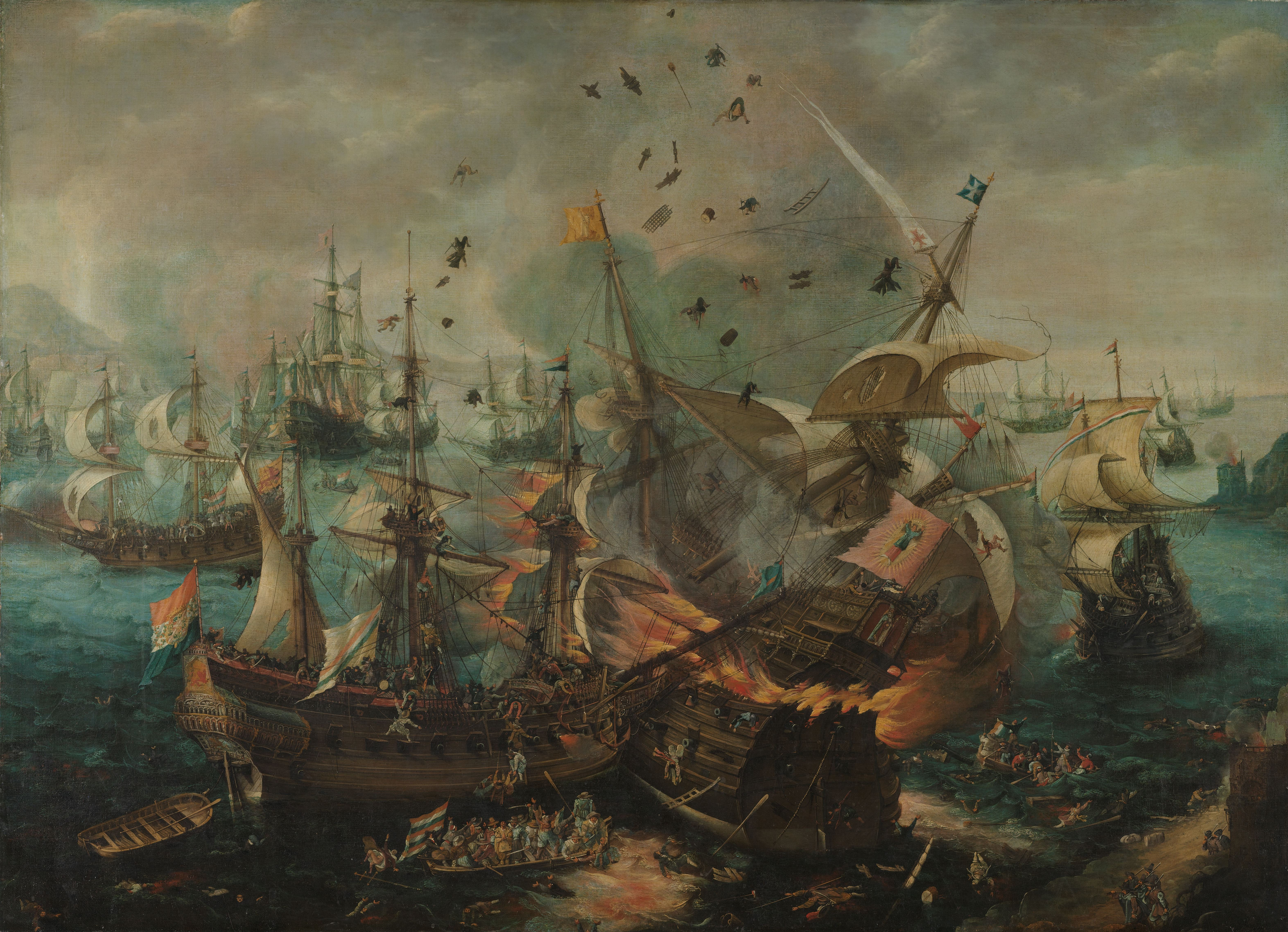
- The Battle of Gibraltar, 1607
Date	c. 1566/1568 – 30 January 1648
Location	European theatre (c. 1566/1568): The Low Countries (present-day Belgium, Luxembourg, Netherlands, and part of western Germany and northern France); European waters: North Sea, English Channel, coast of the Iberian Peninsula, Mediterranean Sea; Overseas (from the 1590s): Atlantic Ocean: Canary Islands and Azores; Americas: Caribbean Sea, the Guianas, Northeast Brazil and southwest South America; Africa: West Africa and Southern Africa; Asia: Indian Ocean, South Asia, Southeast Asia and East Asia
Result	Peace of Münster
Territorial changes	Dutch Republic recognized by Spain

Belligerents
Dutch Republic (from 1588) (Note: The nascent political organization reached by the rebellious northern provinces with the Union of Utrecht on 23 January 1579, Groenveld 2009, pp. 16–17 Groenveld 2009, pp. 10–11 would be followed by the Act of Abjuration on 26 July 1581, declaring de facto independence from Spain, Groenveld 2009, pp. 18–19 to finally become a republic by approving the Instruction of 12 April 1588.): States-General (1576–1588) (Note: With the Pacification of Ghent on 8 November 1576, the States General of the Seventeen Provinces, except Luxemburg, managed to articulate a joint Catholic-Protestant political and military rebellion against the Spanish imperial government. But various political, religious and military circumstances caused this union to collapse in 1579, the year in which the Netherlands was divided in two, with the Catholic provinces of the south joining in the Union of Arras on 6 January and the Protestant provinces of the north (in general terms) at the Union of Utrecht of 23 January. The southern provinces would once again be under the orbit of the Spanish government, while the northern provinces would reaffirm their political and military alliance against Spain.); Dutch rebels (c. 1566/68–1576) (Note: The rebellious provinces of the Netherlands managed to form a joint political and military rebellion against Spain after the Pacification of Ghent on 8 November 1576.) European allies: Kingdom of England (1585–1604, 1625–1630); Kingdom of France (1589–1598, from 1635); Anjou (1578–1583) (Note: In 1576, the States General called, at the suggestion of William the Silent, Francis, Duke of Anjou, to request his protection. In 1578 Anjou intervened with an army of French in the south of the Netherlands, but did not achieve the expected results and withdrew. In the following years he again invaded the southern Netherlands, and on 23 January 1581 the Treaty of Plessis-les-Tours was ratified between Anjou and the States General to agree to his reign in the region. His intervention in the Netherlands ended in 1583 after several defeats of his forces.); Kingdom of Portugal (from 1641) (Note: After the outbreak of the Portuguese rebellion in 1640, on 12 June 1641, to the detriment of Spain, a truce and alliance agreement was reached between the Dutch Republic and Portugal with the Treaty of The Hague. But this agreement was only limited to Europe, thus continuing the struggle between the Dutch and Portuguese in the colonies.); Huguenots; Various German States; Nassau	Spanish Empire European co-belligerent: Holy Roman Empire (1629, 1632, 1635) (Note: During the Thirty Years' War, the Holy Roman Empire supported Spain with Imperial forces on the Low Countries front in 1629, 1632, and 1635, although it never directly waged war against the Dutch Republic.)

Commanders and leaders
William the Silent X; Maurice of Orange; Frederick Henry; Johan van Oldenbarnevelt (executed); William Louis; Maarten Tromp; Elizabeth I; James VI and I; Charles I; Robert Dudley; Francis Vere; Henry IV; Duke of Bouillon; Louis XIII; Cardinal Richelieu	Philip II #; Philip III; Philip IV; Margaret of Parma; Duke of Alba; Álvarez de Toledo; John of Austria; Alexander Farnese; Archduke Albert; Isabella Eugenia; Ambrogio Spinola; Cardinal-Infante Ferdinand; Fadrique de Toledo; Antonio de Oquendo

Strength
1629: 70,000 regular soldiers 50,000 militia 8,500 sailors with 100+ warships	60,000 (average strength in the Army of Flanders); 88,000 (peak strength in the Army of Flanders)

The Eighty Years' War (Note: Dutch: Tachtigjarige Oorlog; Spanish: Guerra de los Ochenta Años or Guerra de Flandes, lit. 'War of Flanders'; Picard: Wère ed Quateur-vingts Ans) or Dutch Revolt (Note: Dutch: Nederlandse Opstand; Spanish: La Revuelta neerlandesa; Picard: Rèvolte hollandaise) (c. 1566/1568–1648) (Note: There is disagreement about name and periodisation of the war, see Historiography of the Eighty Years' War § Name and periodisation.) was an armed conflict in the Habsburg Netherlands (Note: The Habsburg Netherlands were at the time also known as the Seventeen Provinces, today roughly covering the Netherlands, Belgium, Luxembourg and parts of northern France, but excluding areas such as the Principality of Liège.) between disparate groups of rebels and the Spanish government. The causes of the war included the Reformation, centralisation, excessive taxation, and the rights and privileges of the Dutch nobility and cities.

After the initial stages, Philip II of Spain, the sovereign of the Netherlands, deployed his armies and regained control over most of the rebel-held territories. However, widespread mutinies in the Spanish army caused a general uprising. Under the leadership of the exiled William the Silent, the Catholic and Protestant-dominated provinces sought to establish religious peace while jointly opposing the king's regime with the Pacification of Ghent, but the general rebellion failed to sustain itself.

Despite steady military and diplomatic successes by the Governor of Spanish Netherlands and General for Spain, the Duke of Parma, the Union of Utrecht continued their resistance, proclaiming their independence through the 1581 Act of Abjuration and establishing the Calvinist-dominated Dutch Republic in 1588. In the Ten Years thereafter, the Republic (whose heartland was no longer threatened) made conquests in the north and east and received diplomatic recognition from France and England in 1596. The Dutch colonial empire emerged, which began with Dutch attacks on Portugal's overseas territories.

Facing a stalemate, the two sides agreed to a Twelve Years' Truce in 1609; when it expired in 1621, fighting resumed as part of the broader Thirty Years' War. An end was reached in 1648 with the Peace of Münster when Spain retained the Southern Netherlands and recognised the Dutch Republic as an independent country.

== Background ==
The origins of the Eighty Years' War are complicated, and have been a source of disputes amongst historians for centuries.

The Habsburg Netherlands emerged as a result of the territorial expansion of the Burgundian State in the 14th and 15th centuries. Upon extinction of the Burgundian State in 1477/1482, these lands were inherited by the House of Habsburg, whose Charles V became both King of Spain (Note: Constitutionally, the Crowns of Castile and Aragon would not be united into the Kingdom of Spain until the 1707–1716 Nueva Planta decrees, and Charles formally reigned as Charles I of Castile and Aragon (sometimes informally called "Spain"). But in historiography, he is more commonly known as Emperor Charles V.) and Holy Roman Emperor. By conquering the rest of what would become the "Seventeen Provinces" during the Guelders Wars (1502–1543), and seeking to combine these disparate regions into a single political entity, Charles aspired to counter the Protestant Reformation and keep all his subjects obedient to the Catholic Church.

King Philip II of Spain, in his capacity as sovereign of Habsburg Netherlands, continued the Counter-Reformation and centralisation policies of his father Charles V. Resistance grew among the moderate nobility and population (both Catholic and dissenting) of the Netherlands. (Note: Unless otherwise indicated, "Netherlands" and "Netherlandish" refer here to the entire area of the Habsburg Netherlands and its inhabitants (including modern Belgium, Luxembourg and parts of northern France, but excluding areas such as the Principality of Liège), whereas "Dutch Republic" and "Dutch" will refer to the country, currently known as the Netherlands, and its inhabitants.) This mood first led to peaceful protests (as from the Compromise of Nobles), but the summer of 1566 erupted in violent protests by Calvinists, known as the iconoclastic fury, or (Dutch: Beeldenstorm) across the Netherlands. The Governor of the Habsburg Netherlands, Margaret of Parma, as well as lower authorities, feared insurrection and made further concessions to the Calvinists (such as designation of churches for Calvinist worship), but in December 1566 and early 1567 the first actual battles between Calvinist rebels and Habsburg governmental forces took place, in what would become known as the Eighty Years' War.

== War ==
=== Insurrection, repression, and invasion (1566–1572) ===
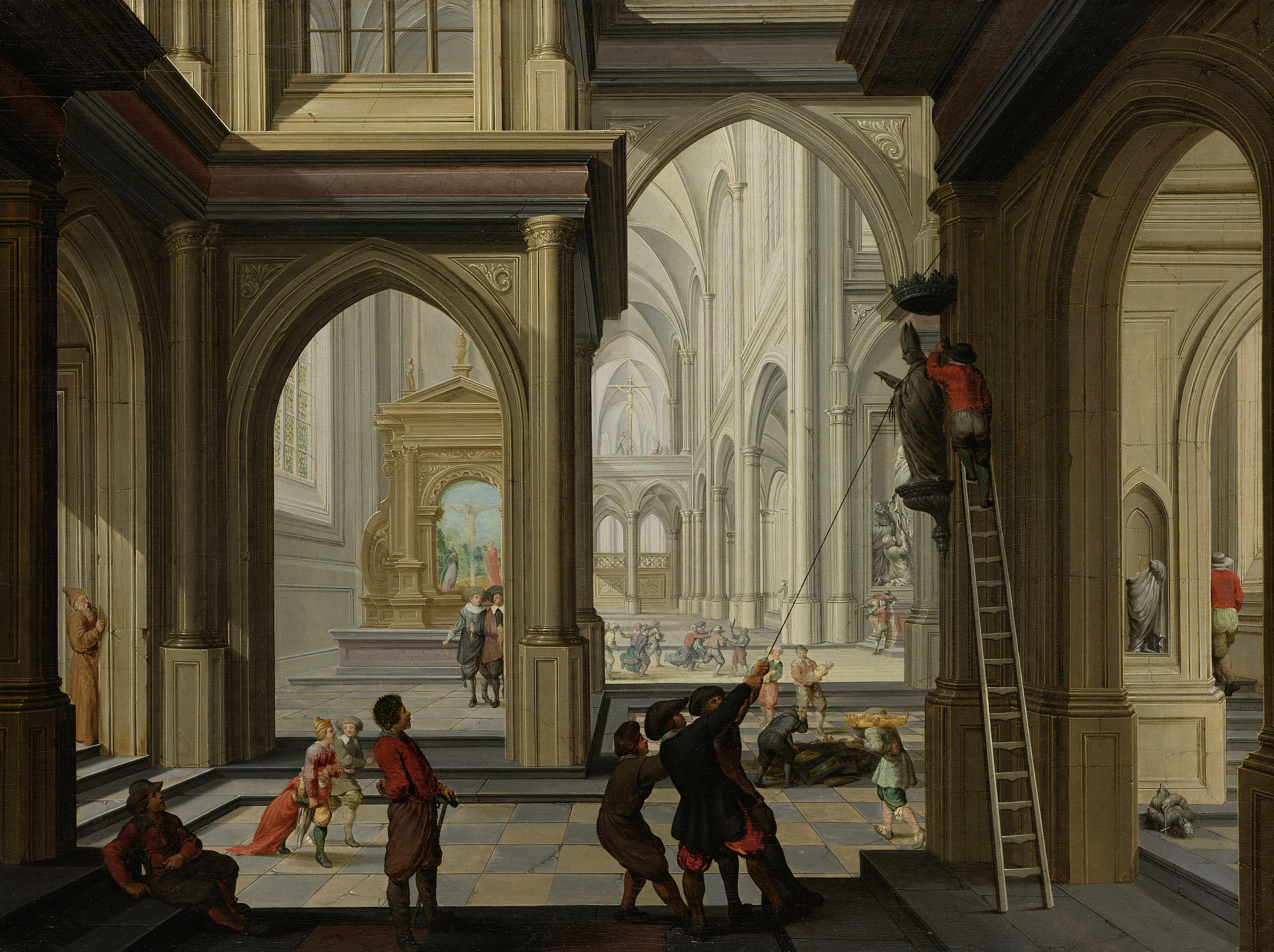
The Beeldenstorm or Iconoclastic Fury was a more or less organised destruction of Catholic sacred objects which swept through the Habsburg Netherlands' churches in 1566. 1630 painting by Dirck van Delen

The period between the start of the Beeldenstorm in August 1566 until early 1572 (before the Capture of Brielle on 1 April 1572) contained the first events of a series that would later be known as the Eighty Years' War between the Spanish Empire and disparate groups of rebels in the Habsburg Netherlands. (Note: "...the starting phase of the Revolt in Zeeland. We label the 1566–1572 period as the strike up to the Revolt: years in which the resistance against central authority, grown out to a rebellion, began to powerfully manifest itself.") Some of the first pitched battles and sieges between radical Calvinists and Habsburg governmental forces took place in the years 1566–1567, followed by the arrival and government takeover by Fernando Álvarez de Toledo, 3rd Duke of Alba (simply known as "Alba" or "Alva") with an army of 10,000 Spanish and Italian soldiers. Next, an ill-fated invasion by the most powerful nobleman of the Low Countries, the exiled but still-Catholic William "the Silent" of Orange, failed to inspire a general anti-government revolt. Although the war seemed over before it got underway, in the years 1569–1571, Alba's repression grew severe, and opposition against his regime mounted to new heights and became susceptible to rebellion.

Although virtually all historians place the start of the war somewhere in this period, there is no historical consensus on which exact event should be considered to have begun the war. Consequently, there is no agreement whether the war really lasted exactly eighty years. For this and other reasons, some historians have endeavoured to replace the name "Eighty Years' War" with "Dutch Revolt", but there is also no consensus either to which period the term "Dutch Revolt" should apply (be it the prelude to the war, the initial stage(s) of the war, or the entire war).

=== Rebellion (1572–1576) ===
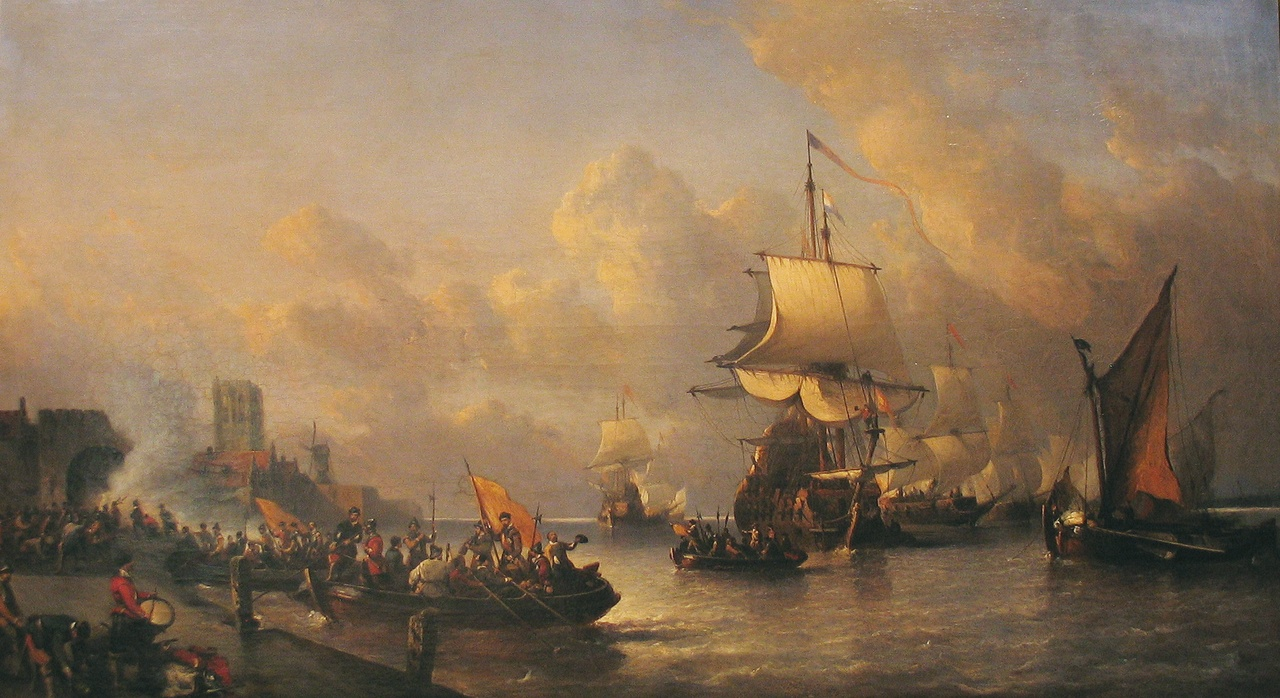
Capture of Brielle in 1572 by Anthonie Waldorp (1862)

The period between the Capture of Brielle (1 April 1572) and the Pacification of Ghent (8 November 1576) was an early stage of the Eighty Years' War (c. 1568–1648) between the Spanish Empire and groups of rebels in the Habsburg Netherlands.

After Watergeuzen (in English known as "Sea Beggars") seized several poorly defended towns and cities in Holland and Zeeland in April 1572, the exiled stadtholder William "the Silent" of Orange launched his second invasion of the Netherlands from the east in another attempt to generate a general uprising against the repressive regime of Spanish General-Governor Fernando Álvarez de Toledo, 3rd Duke of Alba. Acting on orders of Philip II of Spain, Alba sought to exterminate all manifestations of Protestantism and disobedience through inquisition and public executions, as well as abolishing several privileges of the Netherlandish nobility and autonomy of cities, and introducing more stringent taxes.

William's second invasion in 1572 had mixed results, and Alba's son Don Fadrique went on a lightning campaign to retake all towns occupied by Orangist and Geuzen troops in October 1572. Several towns (including Mechelen, Zutphen and Naarden) which refused to surrender were brutally sacked by Fadrique's forces in an attempt to intimidate others into resubmitting themselves to the royal government, culminating in the seven-month-long Siege of Haarlem before it was conquered and sacked in July 1573. By this point, the rebel territory had been reduced to most towns in Holland (notably excluding royalist Amsterdam) and Zeeland, and two towns in Guelders; knowing that violent repression would result from resistance, these cities resolved to fight to the bitter end, while the others capitulated. The Spanish offensive stalled after Haarlem, with the Dutch rebels capturing Geertruidenberg, winning the Siege of Alkmaar and Battle of Delft, and achieving naval superiority. Citing ill health, Alba resigned and returned to Spain in December 1573. During Alba's governorship, the total number of people killed in the Netherlands by executions, burnings, and massacres is estimated to have reached 50,000.

His successor Requesens was more conciliatory, but was unable to force or persuade many places back into governmental control, losing the Siege of Leiden (1573–1574). After his death in March 1576, exacerbated by Spain's state bankruptcy in November 1575, mutinies amongst the unpaid Spanish soldiers started spreading into what became known as the "Spanish Fury", plundering many towns and villages even in loyal territories of the Netherlands. Faced with the mutineer atrocities, particularly the Sack of Antwerp, all the provinces except Luxembourg made an alliance known as the Pacification of Ghent, rising in revolt in November 1576 to demand that Philip II withdraw all foreign troops from the Netherlands, suspend the persecution of Protestants, and consult the States-General in matters of local governance rather than rule by unilateral autocratic action.

=== From Pacification of Ghent to Union of Utrecht (1576–1579) ===
From 8 November 1576 until 23 July 1577 Union of Brussels: the 16 rebel provinces that concluded the 1576 Pacification of Ghent, and demanded the departure of all foreign Spanish troops from the Netherlands Luxemburg, the only province to remain fully loyal to the Spanish government. Most Spanish troops withdrawing from the other provinces were temporarily stationed here from late 1576 to mid-1577

The period between the Pacification of Ghent (8 November 1576), and the Unions of Arras (6 January 1579) and Utrecht (23 January 1579) constituted a crucial phase of the Eighty Years' War (c. 1568–1648) between the Spanish Empire and the rebelling United Provinces, which would become the independent Dutch Republic. Sometimes known as the "general revolt", the period marked the only time of the war where the States–General of all Seventeen Provinces of the Habsburg Netherlands, except Luxemburg, were in joint active political and military rebellion against the Spanish Imperial government through the Pacification of Ghent. The Pacification formulated several agreements amongst the rebellious provinces themselves, and laid down their demands – including the immediate withdrawal of foreign (mostly Spanish, Italian and German) troops from the Netherlands, restitution of old rights and privileges, and self-rule – to king Philip II of Spain.

From 8 November 1576 until 23 July 1577, the new Spanish Governor-General of the Netherlands John of Austria (known to history as "Don Juan") engaged in peace negotiations with the States-General. The First Union of Brussels (9 January 1577) confirmed the Pacification, adding that the States would uphold the Catholic religion in their provinces. By signing the Edict of 1577 on 12 February 1577 at Marche-en-Famenne, Don Juan nominally accepted all demands of the Pacification. Most foreign troops withdrew to the territory of Luxemburg, which had not joined the Pacification. Although a few sieges of cities with Spanish garrisons that refused to withdraw took place, these were mostly resolved quickly by paying them off; in general, the situation had potential for putting an end to the war if agreements could be reached and respected between the parties.

From 24 July 1577 until 6 January 1579, starting with the capture of the Citadel of Namur, Don Juan and his second-in-command and successor Alexander Farnese, Duke of Parma launched a military offensive against the United Provinces, while seeking to reconcile provinces that were willing to subject themselves back under the Spanish royal government under certain conditions. In response, the States-General's Second Union of Brussels (10 December 1577) showed a more fierce and determined opposition to the Spanish government, now demanding (and themselves guaranteeing) equal protection for Catholics and Protestants in all provinces of the Netherlands. William "the Silent" of Orange became the de facto political leader of the United Provinces, while Matthias of Austria was brought in to replace Don Juan as Governor-General.

The Battle of Gembloux (31 January 1578) was a devastating defeat for the rebels, however, and many began to talk about surrender. Moreover, radical Calvinists had seized power in various cities in Flanders and Brabant, most notably the so-called Calvinist Republic of Ghent, persecuting Catholics and alienating many Catholic allies which had up until that point supported the rebellion, but now became known as the Malcontents. Parma was able to successfully exert his diplomatic skills on some of these Malcontents, negotiating with several Catholic noblemen and regents in various southern provinces with promises of respecting their interests in return for abandoning the revolt. Finally, the united front of the States-General collapsed on 6 January 1579 when the County of Artois, the County of Hainaut and the city of Douai signed the Union of Arras, seeking to revert to Catholicism and the Spanish government under more moderate demands than the Pacification. On 17 May 1579, they signed a separate peace treaty with the king. In response, most of the other provinces and cities (virtually only in the Dutch-speaking parts of the Low Countries) sought to reaffirm their commitment to the Pacification, as well as the Second Union of Brussels, and forging an even closer political and military alliance by concluding the Union of Utrecht on 23 January 1579.

=== Secession and reconquest (1579–1588) ===
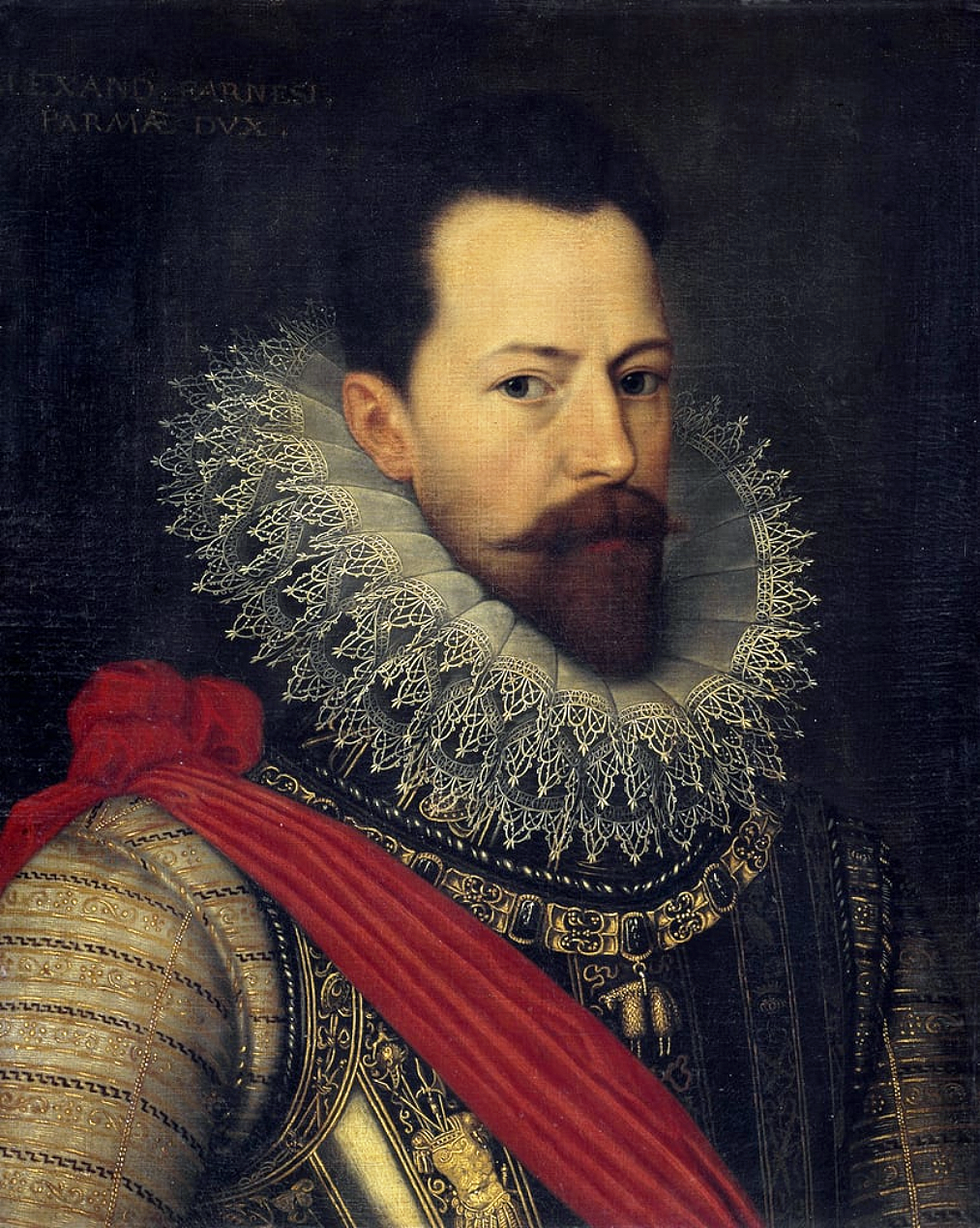
Under Parma's command, the Spanish Army reconquered large parts of the Netherlands in the 1580s.

The years 1579–1588 constituted a phase of the Eighty Years' War (c. 1568–1648) between the Spanish Empire and the United Provinces in revolt after most of them concluded the Union of Utrecht on 23 January 1579, and proceeded to carve the independent Dutch Republic out of the Habsburg Netherlands. It followed the 1576–1579 period, in which a temporary alliance of 16 out of the Seventeen Provinces' States–General established the Pacification of Ghent (8 November 1576) as a joint Catholic–Protestant rebellion against the Spanish government, but internal conflicts as well as military and diplomatic successes of the Spanish Governors-General Don Juan of Austria and Alexander Farnese, Duke of Parma split them apart, finally leading the Malcontent County of Artois, County of Hainaut and city of Douai to sign the Union of Arras on 6 January 1579, reverting to Catholicism and loyalty to the Spanish crown.

In response, most of the remaining rebel provinces and cities would forge or later accede to the Union of Utrecht, a closer military alliance treaty that would go on to become the most important fundamental law of the United Provinces, who on 26 July 1581 proclaimed the Act of Abjuration, a de facto declaration of independence from Spain. Initially, the nascent polity was struggling to find a new sovereign head of state, including Matthias of Austria, Francis of Anjou, Robert of Leicester, and William "the Silent" of Orange, who was assassinated in 1584. After that, the search for a sovereign head of state was given up and it was decided to become the Dutch Republic by the instruction of 12 April 1588. Meanwhile, the Duke of Parma continued his successful military and diplomatic offensive, bringing ever more provinces and cities in the southern, eastern and northeastern parts of the Netherlands back into royalist hands.

Parma's reconquests more or less stalled after the Fall of Antwerp (1585), and finally came to an end with the failure of the Spanish Armada (July–August 1588) and Philip II ordered him to intervene in the French Wars of Religion (September 1589) to prevent the Succession of Henry IV and France becoming a Protestant kingdom. These developments gave rise to a new phase, the Ten Years (1588–1598), that saw significant conquests by the Dutch States Army under the leadership of stadtholders Maurice of Nassau and William Louis of Nassau-Dillenburg, and the Dutch Republic's rise as a commercial great power.

=== Ten Years (1588–1598) ===
Conquests made by Maurice in his 1597 campaign

The Ten Years (Dutch: Tien jaren) were a period in the Eighty Years' War spanning the years 1588 to 1598. During this period, the forces of the Dutch Republic under stadtholder Maurice of Nassau, his cousin William Louis, Count of Nassau-Dillenburg, the stadtholder of Friesland, and the English general Francis Vere won a series of campaigns against the Spanish Empire. These campaigns brought much of the north and east of the Habsburg Netherlands under Republican control.

Beginning with the relief of Bergen op Zoom in 1588, Maurice and William Louis subsequently captured Breda in 1590; Zutphen, Deventer, Delfzijl, and Nijmegen in 1591; Steenwijk and Coevorden in 1592; Geertruidenberg in 1593; Groningen in 1594; and Grol, Enschede, Ootmarsum, and Oldenzaal in 1597. Many of these territories had been previously lost to the Spanish in the 1580s.

Historians have also associated Maurice's campaigns during this period with reforms in siege warfare and military organisation, and with the consolidation of the Republic's position in the northern Netherlands.

=== Run-up to the Truce (1599–1609) ===
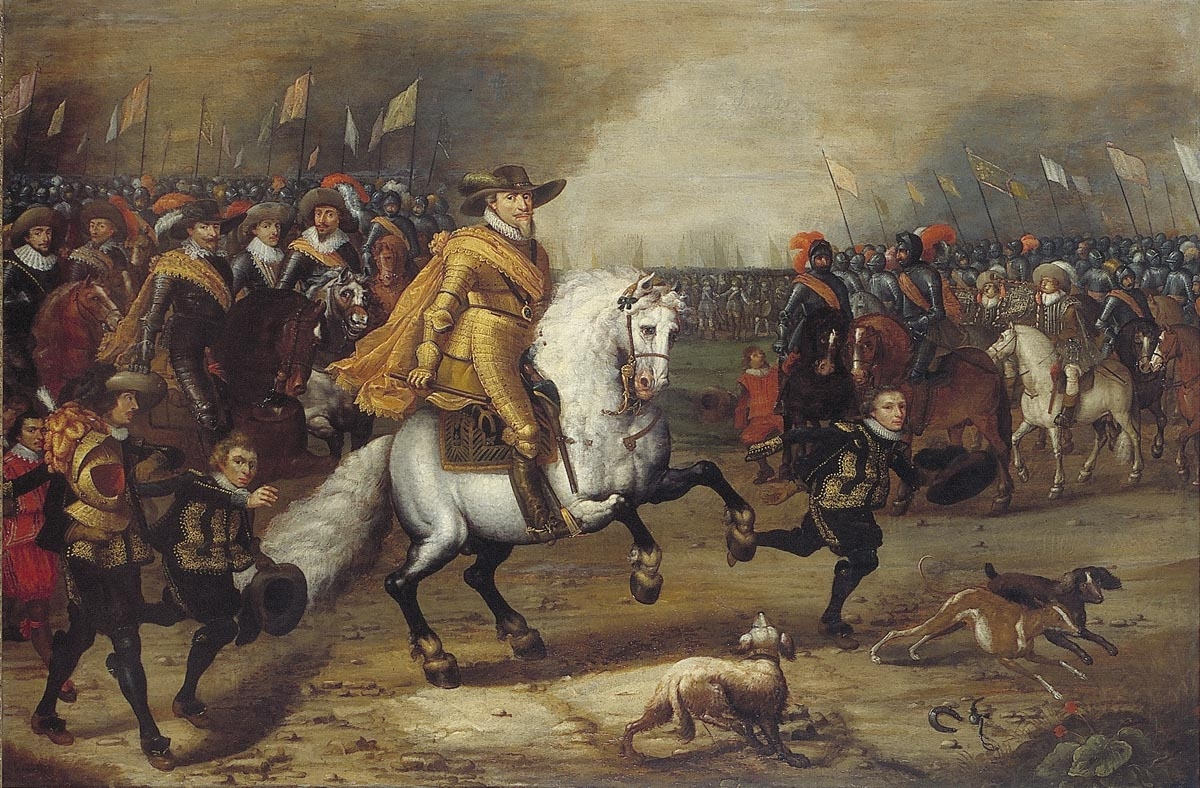
Stadtholder Maurice of Nassau during the 1600 Battle of Nieuwpoort, a tactical Dutch victory for little gain

The years 1599–1609 constituted a phase in the Eighty Years' War (c. 1568–1648) between the Spanish Empire and the emerging Dutch Republic. It followed the Ten Years (1588–1598) that saw significant conquests by the Dutch States Army under the leadership of stadtholders Maurice of Nassau and William Louis of Nassau-Dillenburg, and ended with the conclusion of the Twelve Years' Truce (1609–1621) on 9 April 1609. From 1599 to 1609 the conflict largely settled into a stalemate. The Battle of Nieuwpoort (1600) yielded a Dutch tactical victory without durable strategic gains. Spain recorded successes at the Siege of Ostend (1601–1604) and during Spinola's campaign of 1605–1606, while the Dutch won a naval victory at the Battle of Gibraltar (1607); Spain also went bankrupt that year, and had to suspend payments of its troops in the Low Countries. Financial pressures were among the factors that led both sides, especially Spain, to pursue a ceasefire.

=== Twelve Years' Truce (1609–1621) ===
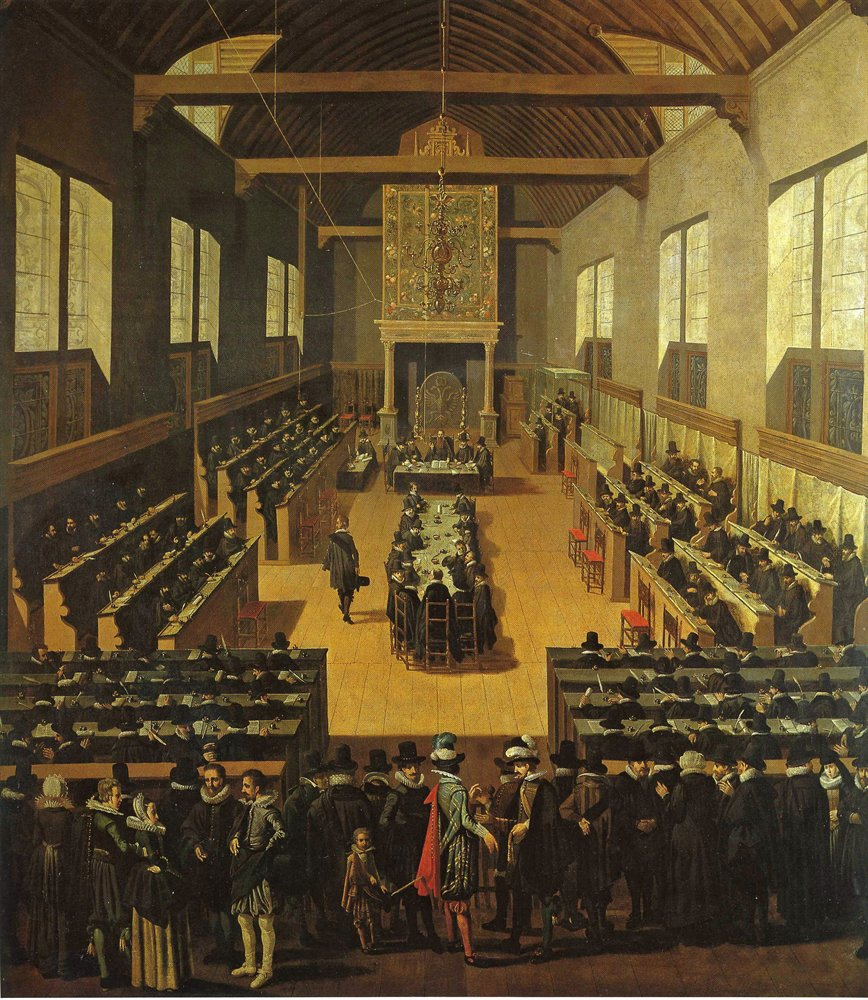
The Synod of Dort.

The military upkeep and decreased trade had put both Spain and the Dutch Republic under financial strain. To alleviate conditions, a ceasefire was signed in Antwerp on 9 April 1609, marking the end of the Dutch Revolt and the beginning of the Twelve Years' Truce. The conclusion of this Truce was a major diplomatic coup for Holland's advocate Johan van Oldenbarnevelt, as Spain by concluding the Treaty, formally recognised the independence of the Republic. In Spain the truce was seen as a major humiliation – she had suffered a political, military and ideological defeat, and the affront to its prestige was immense. The closure of the river Scheldt to traffic in and out of Antwerp, and the acceptance of Dutch commercial operations in the Spanish and Portuguese colonial maritime lanes were just a few points that the Spanish found objectionable.

Although there was peace on an international level, political unrest took hold of Dutch domestic affairs. What had started as a theological quarrel resulted in riots between Remonstrants (Arminians) and Counter-Remonstrants (Gomarists). In general, regents would support the former and civilians the latter. Even the government got involved, with Oldenbarnevelt taking the side of the Remonstrants and stadtholder Maurice of Nassau their opponents. In the end, the Synod of Dort condemned the Remonstrants for heresy and excommunicated them from the national Public Church. Van Oldenbarnevelt was sentenced to death, together with his ally Gilles van Ledenberg, while two other Remonstrant allies, Rombout Hogerbeets and Hugo Grotius, received life imprisonment.

=== Final phase of the war (1621–1648) ===
The Low Countries in 1621–1628 Dutch Republic Dutch conquests Spanish Netherlands Spanish conquests Prince-Bishopric of Liège

The years 1621–1648 constituted the final phase of the Eighty Years' War (c. 1568–1648) between the Spanish Empire and the emerging Dutch Republic. It began when the Twelve Years' Truce (1609–1621) expired, and concluded with the Peace of Münster in 1648.

Although the Dutch and Spanish were both involved in opposite sides of the War of the Jülich Succession (June 1609 – October 1610; May–October 1614) in Jülich-Cleves-Berg, they carefully avoided each other, and thus the hostilities never spread back into the Habsburg Netherlands, and the truce held firm. Nevertheless, attempts to negotiate a definitive peace also failed, and the war resumed as anticipated in 1621. Essentially, it became a side theatre of the wider Thirty Years' War that had already broken out with the Bohemian Revolt in 1618 in eastern parts of the Holy Roman Empire (Bohemia and Austria), pitting Central Europe's Protestant Union against the Catholic League, although the two conflicts never fully merged. With several back and forths – notably, the Spanish conquered Breda in 1625, but the Dutch took it back in 1637 – the Dutch Republic was able to conquer the eastern border forts of Oldenzaal (1626) and Groenlo (1627), the major Brabantian city of 's-Hertogenbosch (1629), the fortified cities of Venlo, Roermond and Maastricht along the Meuse (1632), and Sas van Gent (1644) and Hulst (1645) in Zeelandic Flanders.

Nevertheless, peace talks in 1629–1630 came to nothing. More ambitious plans to conquer Brussels in 1632–1633 with the help of anti-Spanish nobility in the Southern Netherlands never came to fruition. Several attempted Northern republican surprises and sieges of Antwerp were parried by the Spanish Army of Flanders.

Nor did the Franco-Dutch alliance bring significant changes to the situation on the ground. It began with a disastrous Franco-Dutch invasion of the southern Netherlands in 1635. This in fact made matters worse for the Dutch when French and Dutch troops sacked the city of Tienen, which cost them the sympathies of the southern Netherlands population.

However, French intervention and internal discontent at the costs of the war in the Low Countries led to a change in Spain's 'Netherlands First' policy. Instead Spain focused on suppressing the French-backed Reapers' War in Catalonia. The resulting stalemate and financial troubles, plus Spanish military exhaustion and Dutch desire for formal political recognition, eventually convinced both sides in the mid-1640s to hold peace talks.

The outcome was the 1648 Peace of Münster, which confirmed most agreements already reached with the Truce of 1609.

=== Peace of Münster ===
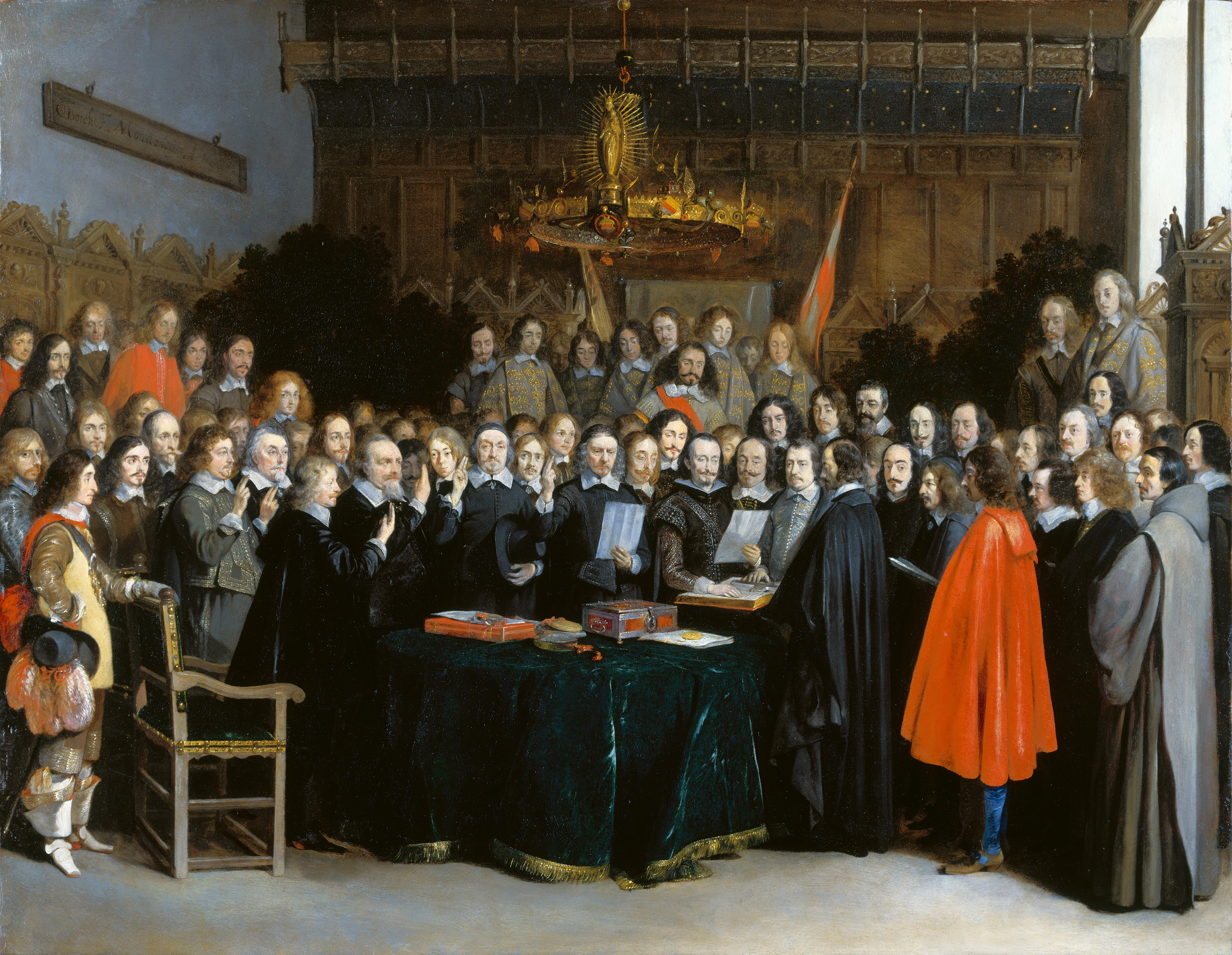
Swearing of the Peace of Münster by Gerard ter Borch

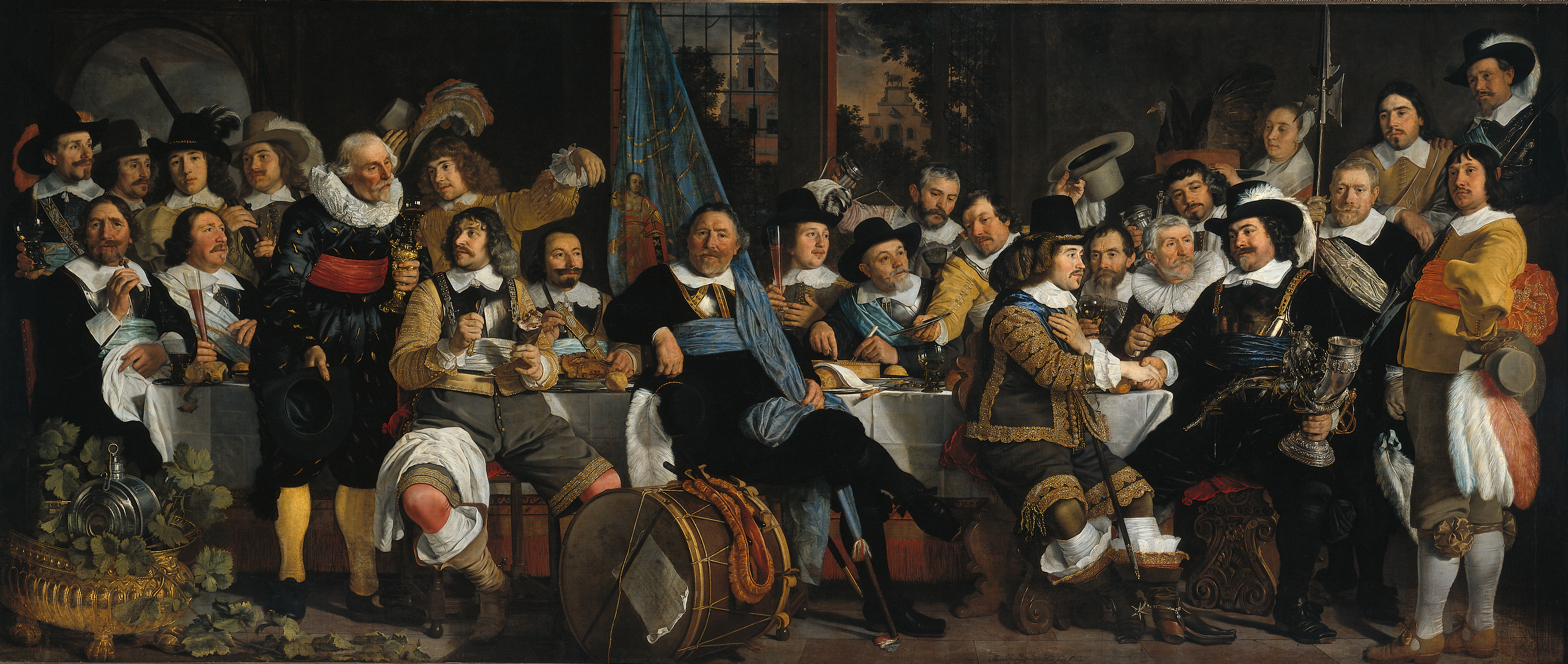
The Celebration of the Peace of Münster (1648) by Bartholomeus van der Helst

The negotiations between Spain and the Republic formally started in January 1646 as part of the more general peace negotiations between the warring parties in the Thirty Years' War. The States General sent eight delegates from several of the provinces as none trusted the others to represent them adequately. They were Willem van Ripperda (Overijssel), Frans van Donia (Friesland), Adriaen Clant tot Stedum (Groningen), Adriaan Pauw and Jan van Mathenesse (Holland), Barthold van Gent (Gelderland), Johan de Knuyt (Zeeland) and Godert van Reede (Utrecht). The Spanish delegation was led by Gaspar de Bracamonte, 3rd Count of Peñaranda. The negotiations were held in what is now the Haus der Niederlande in Münster.

The Dutch and Spanish delegations soon reached an agreement, based on the text of the Twelve Years' Truce. It therefore confirmed Spain's recognition of Dutch independence. The Dutch demands (closure of the Scheldt, cession of the Meierij, formal cession of Dutch conquests in the Indies and Americas, and lifting of the Spanish embargoes) were generally met. However, the general negotiations between the main parties dragged on, because France kept formulating new demands. Eventually it was decided therefore to split off the peace between the Republic and Spain from the general peace negotiations. This enabled the two parties to conclude what technically was a separate peace (to the annoyance of France, which maintained that this contravened the alliance treaty of 1635 with the Republic).

The text of the Treaty (in 79 articles) was fixed on 30 January 1648. It was then sent to the principals (King Philip IV of Spain and the States General) for ratification. Five provinces voted to ratify (against the advice of stadtholder William) on 4 April (Zeeland and Utrecht being opposed). Utrecht finally yielded to pressure by the other provinces, but Zeeland held out and refused to sign. It was eventually decided to ratify the peace without Zeeland's consent. The delegates to the peace conference affirmed the peace on oath on 15 May 1648 (though the delegate of Zeeland refused to attend, and the delegate of Utrecht suffered a possibly diplomatic illness).

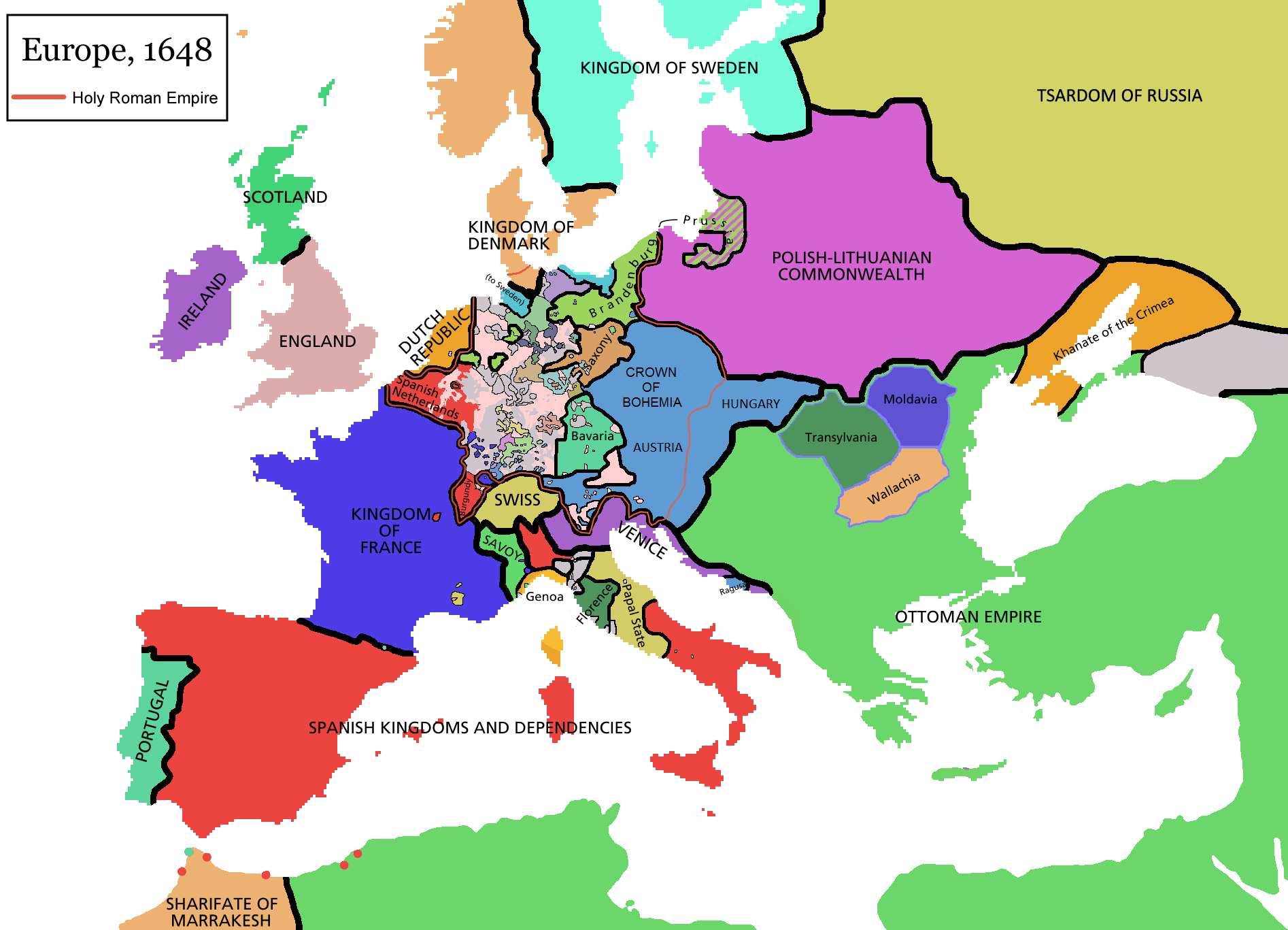
Europe after the Peace of Westphalia, 1648

In the broader context of the treaties between France and the Holy Roman Empire, and Sweden and the Holy Roman Empire of 14 and 24 October 1648, which comprise the Peace of Westphalia, but which were not signed by the Republic, the Republic now also gained formal "independence" from the Holy Roman Empire, just like the Swiss Cantons. In both cases, this was just a formalisation of a situation that had long existed. France and Spain did not conclude a treaty and so remained at war until the peace of the Pyrenees of 1659. The peace was celebrated in the Republic with sumptuous festivities. It was solemnly promulgated on the 80th anniversary of the execution of the Counts of Egmont and Horne on 5 June 1648. (Note: The Dutch States General, for dramatic effect, decided to promulgate the ratification of the Peace of Münster (which was actually ratified by them on 15 May 1648) on the 80th anniversary of the execution of the Counts of Egmont and Horne, 5 June 1648.)

== Aftermath ==
The aftermath of the Eighty Years' War (c. 1568–1648) had far-reaching military, political, socio-economic, religious, and cultural effects on the Low Countries, the Spanish Empire, the Holy Roman Empire, as well as other regions of Europe and European colonies overseas. By the Peace of Münster (15 May 1648), the Habsburg Netherlands were split in two, with the northern Protestant-dominated Netherlands becoming the Dutch Republic, independent of the Spanish and Holy Roman Empires, while the southern Catholic-dominated Spanish Netherlands remained under Spanish Habsburg sovereignty. Whereas the Spanish Empire and the Southern Netherlands along with it were financially and demographically ruined, declining politically and economically, the Dutch Republic became a global commercial power and achieved a high level of prosperity for its upper and middle classes known as the Dutch Golden Age, despite continued great socio-economic, geographic and religious inequalities and problems, as well as internal and external political, military and religious conflicts.

== Historiography ==
The Eighty Years' War has given rise to more historical controversies than any other topic from the history of the Nederlanden [Low Countries] whatsoever.

— Encarta Encyclopedie Winkler Prins (2002)

The historiography of the Eighty Years' War examines how the Eighty Years' War has been viewed or interpreted throughout the centuries. Some of the main issues of contention between scholars include the name of the war (most notably "Eighty Years' War" versus "Dutch Revolt"), the periodisation of the war (particularly when it started, which events to include or exclude, and whether the effective length of the war justifies counting "eighty years" or not), the origins or causes of the war (the Protestant Reformation or the violation of the rights and privileges of the nobility and autonomous cities) and thus its nature (a religious war, a civil war or a war of independence), the meaning of its historical documents such as the Act of Abjuration, and the role of its central characters such as Philip II of Spain, William "the Silent" of Orange, Margaret of Parma, the Duke of Alba, the Duke of Parma, Maurice of Orange, and Johan van Oldenbarnevelt. It has been theorised that Protestant Reformation propaganda has given rise to the Spanish Black Legend in order to portray the actions of the Spanish Empire, the Army of Flanders and the Catholic Church in an exaggerated extremely negative light, while other scholars maintain that the atrocities committed by the Spanish military in order to preserve the Habsburg Netherlands for the Empire have historically been portrayed fairly accurately. Controversy also rages about the importance of the war for the emergence of the Dutch Republic as the predecessor of the current Kingdom of the Netherlands and the role of the House of Orange's stadtholders in it, as well as the development of Dutch and Belgian national identities as a result of the split of the Northern and Southern Netherlands.

== Gallery ==
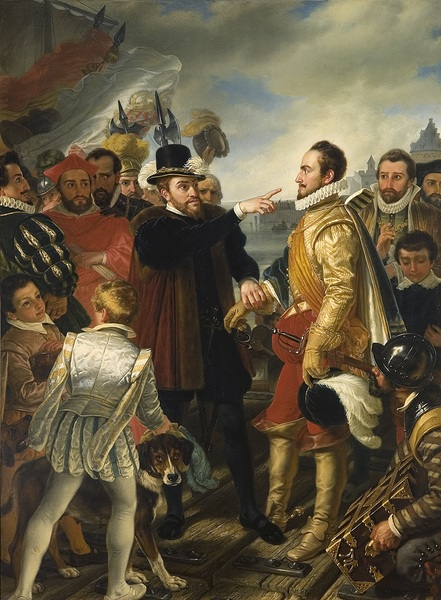
Philip II, King of Spain, Reproaches William I, Prince of Orange, in Vlissingen upon his Departure from the Netherlands in 1559. By Cornelis Kruseman.

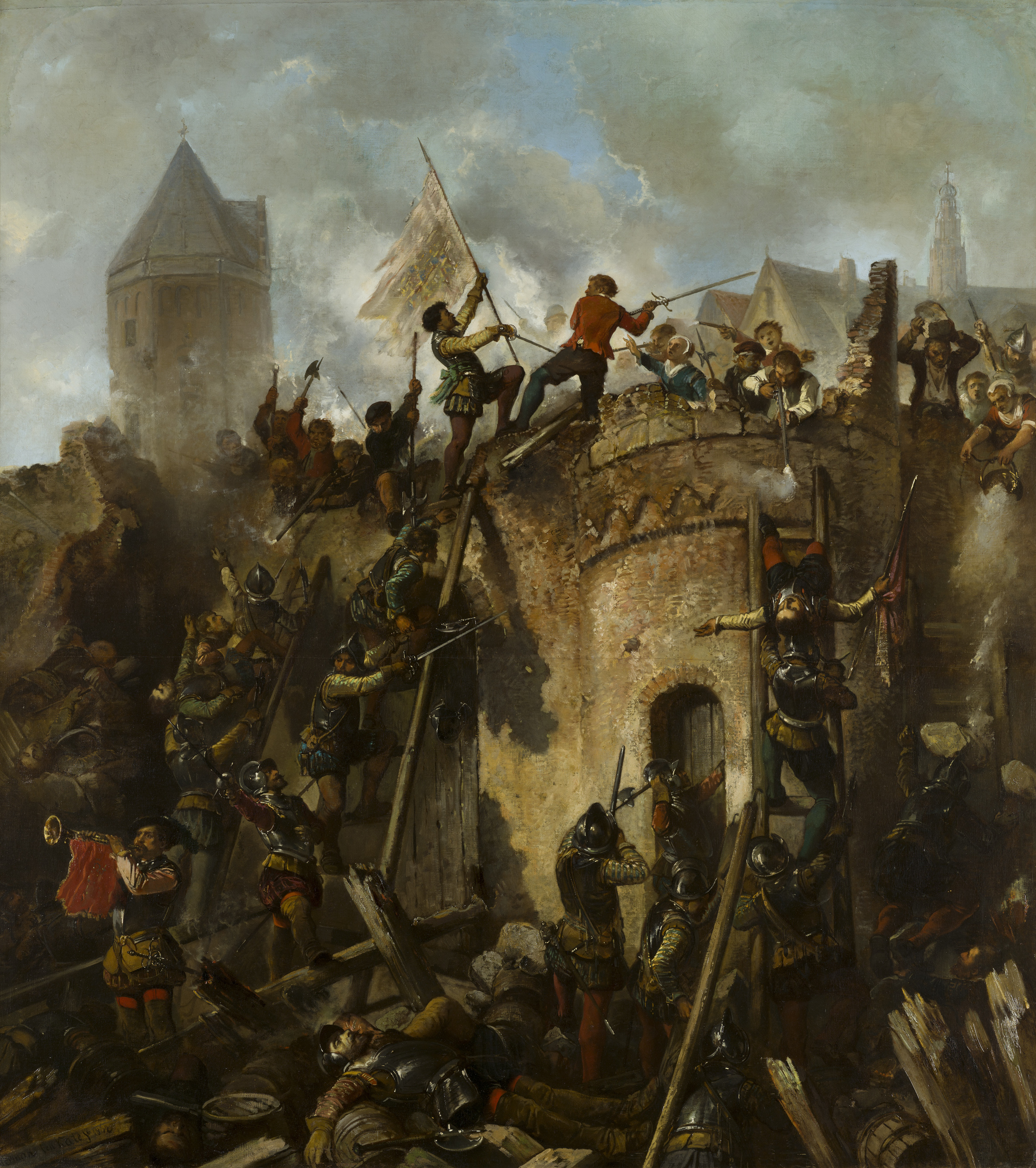
Siege of Alkmaar, by Herman Frederik Carel ten Kate.

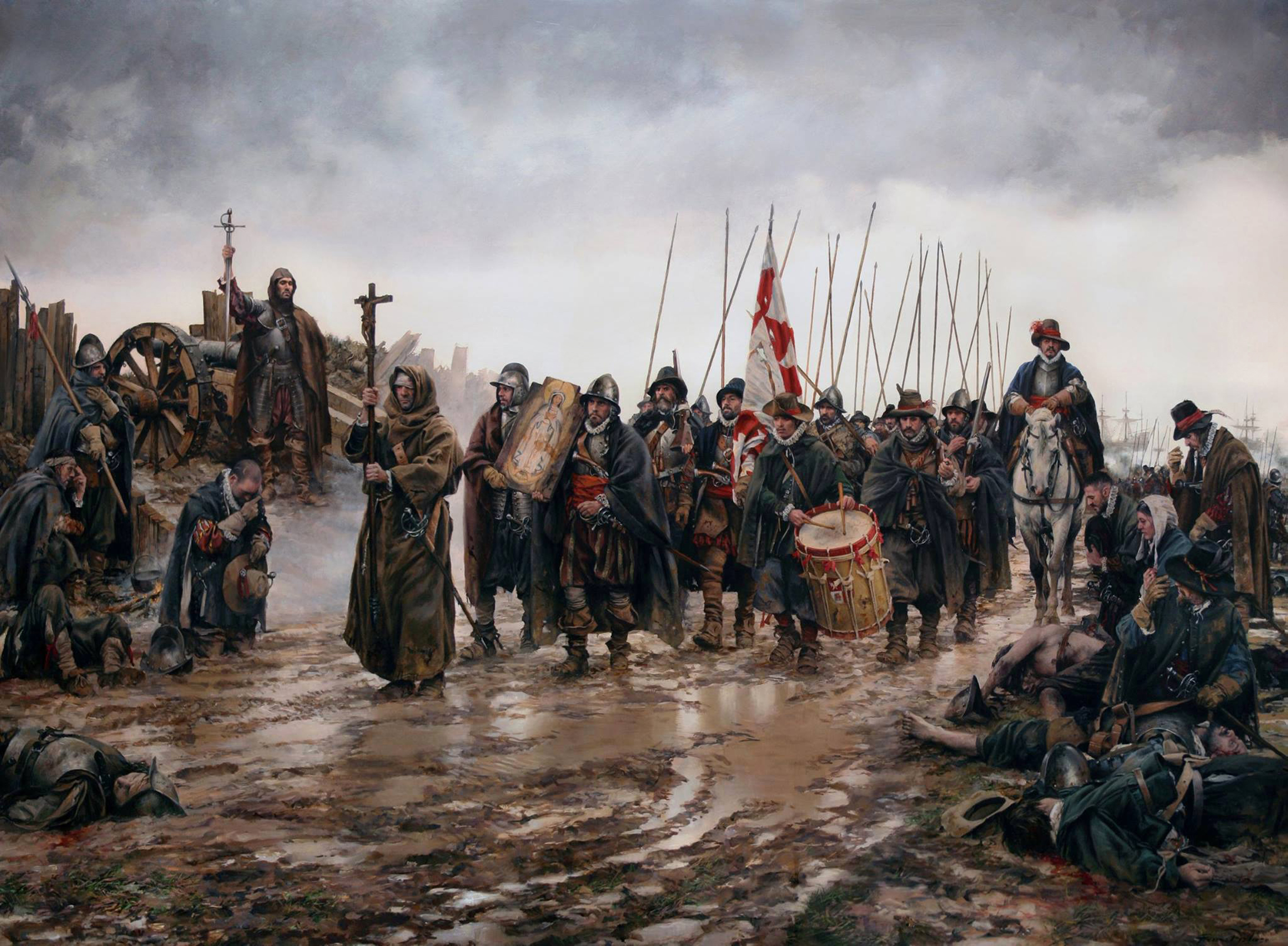
El milagro de Empel, by Augusto Ferrer-Dalmau.

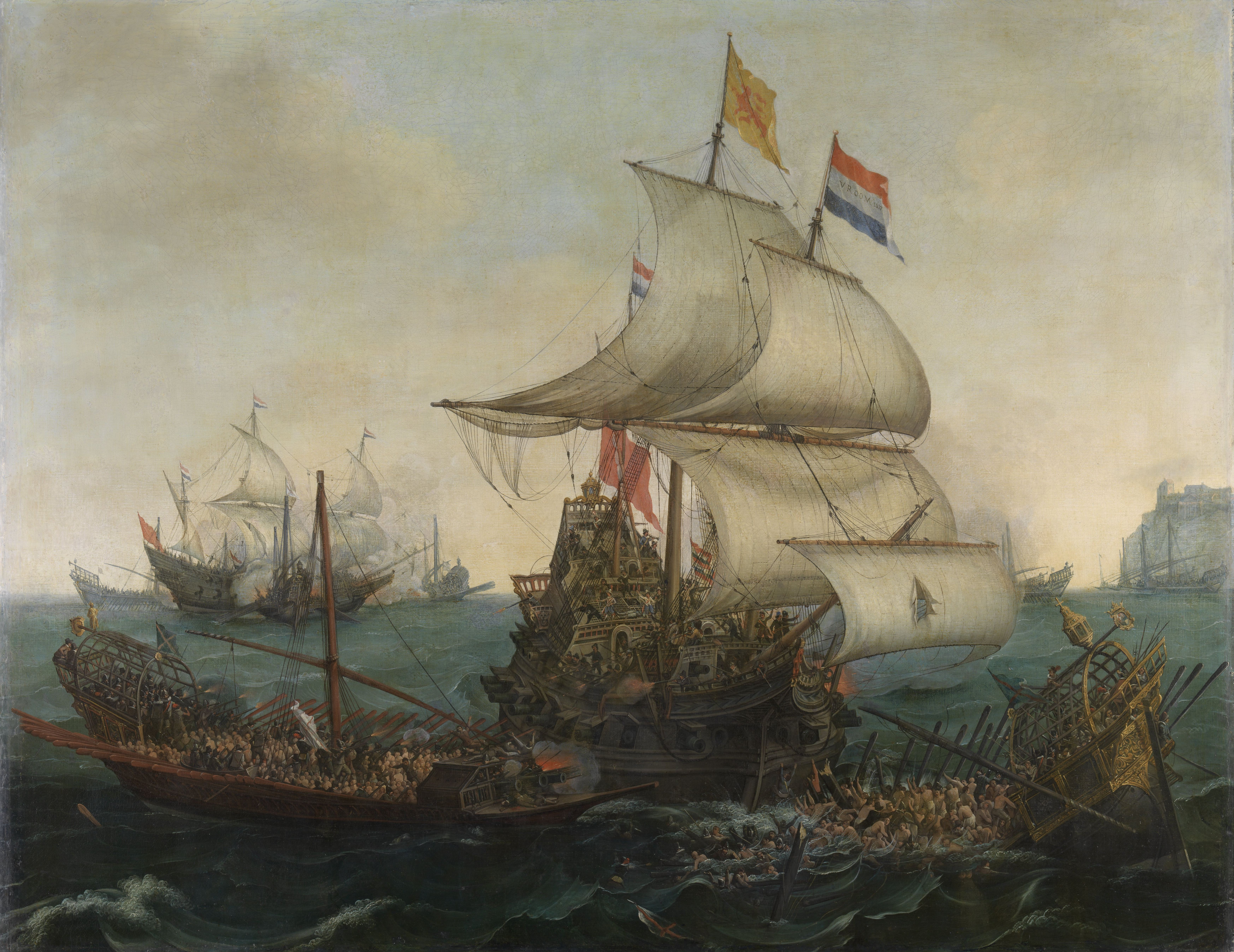
Battle of the Narrow Seas, by Hendrick Cornelisz Vroom.

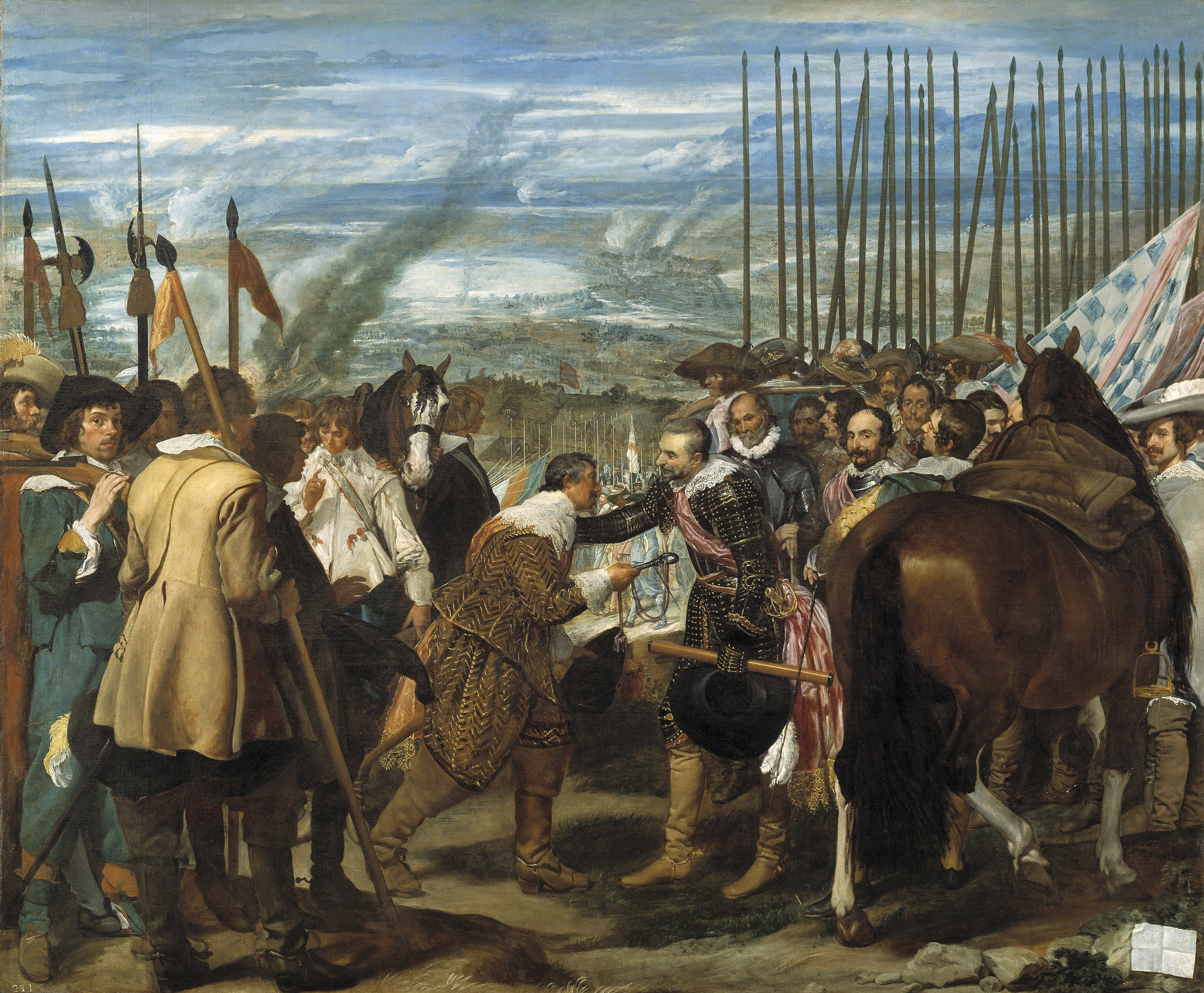
The Surrender of Breda by Diego Velázquez.

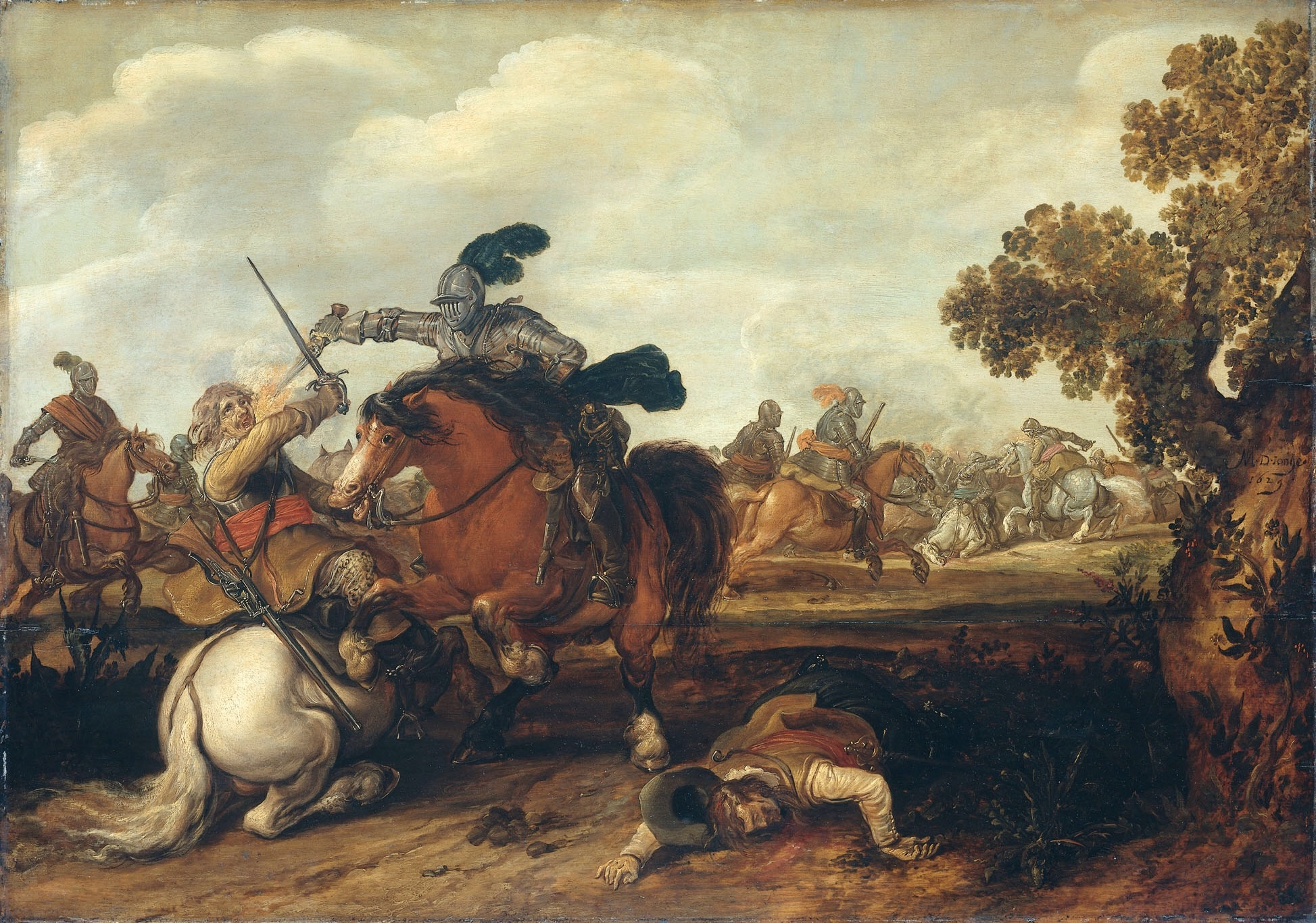
A cavalry battle, by Jan Martszen de Jonge.

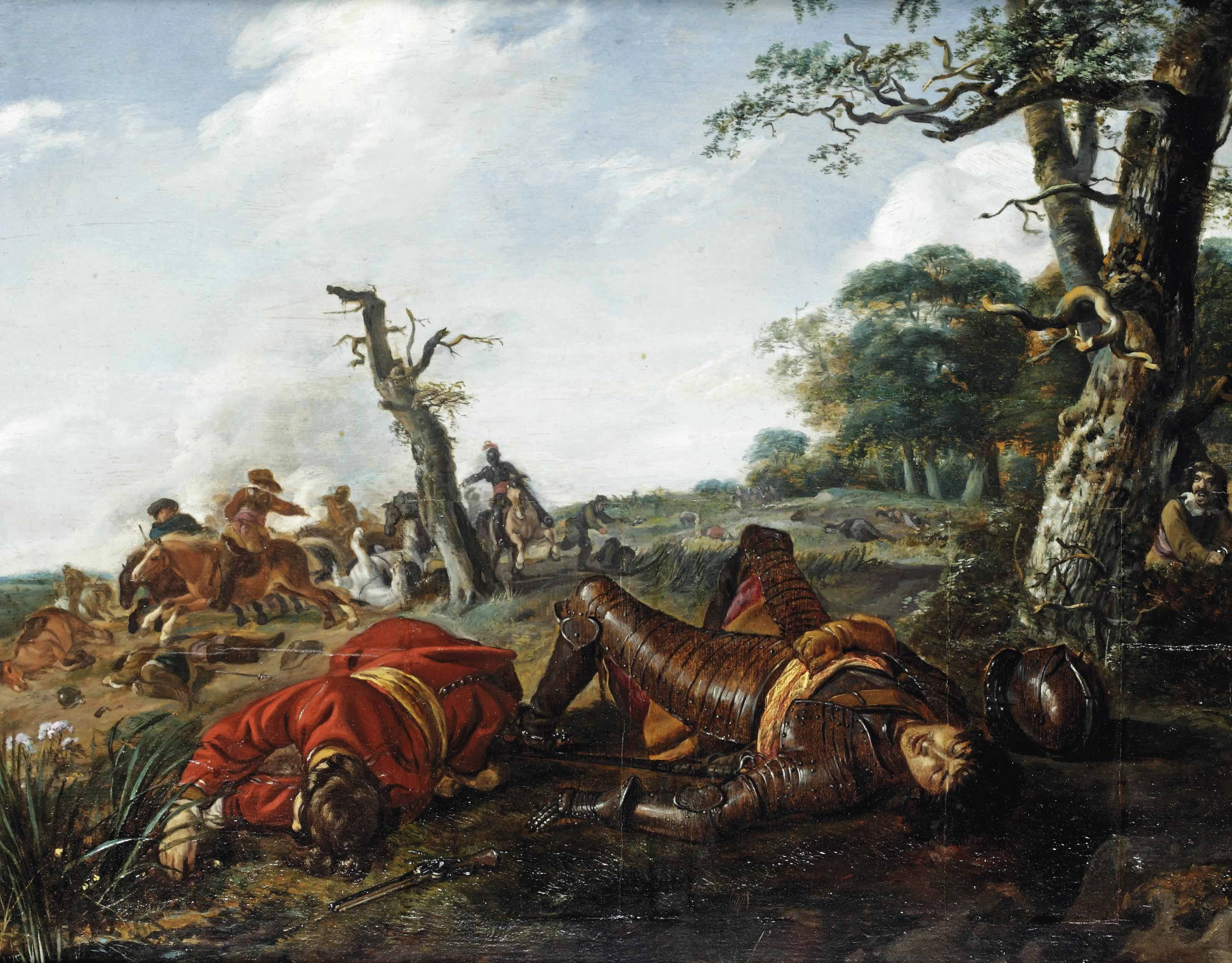
A battle scene from the Eighty Years' War by Jan Martszen de Jonge.

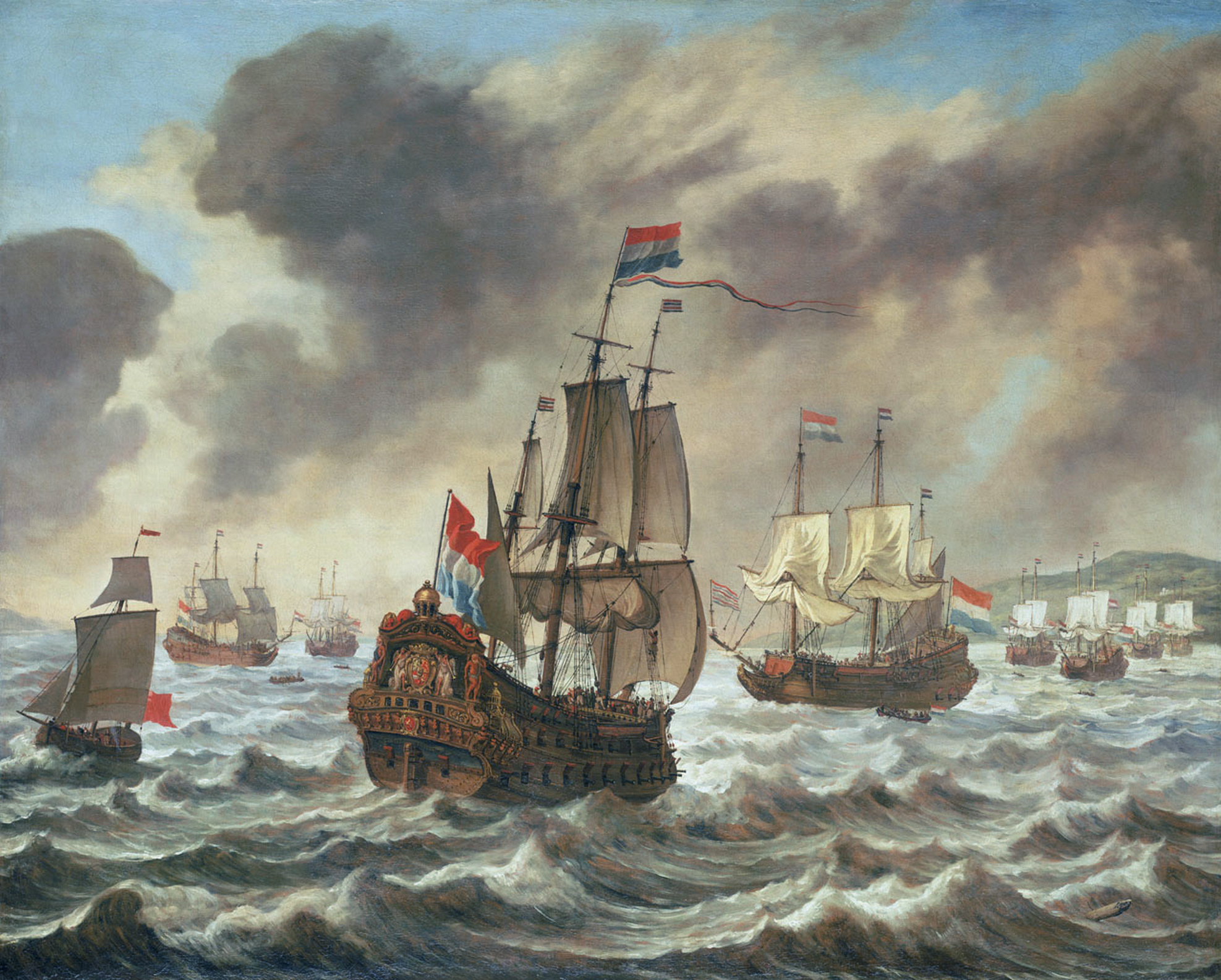
Before the Battle of the Downs by Reinier Nooms.

== See also ==
- Act of Abjuration
- Bourgeois revolution
- European wars of religion
- List of battles of the Eighty Years' War
- Martyrs of Gorkum
- "Merck toch hoe sterck"—Dutch patriotic song
- Second conquest of Franche-Comté
- Siege of Lure
- Spanish Road
- Union of Delft
- Wars of national liberation

== Bibliography ==
- Beausobre, Isaac de (1733). Mémoires de Frederic Henri de Nassau Prince d'Orange (in French). Pierre Humbert.
- Bengoa, José (2003). Historia de los antiguos mapuches del sur [History of the ancient Mapuches of the south] (in Spanish). Santiago: Catalonia. ISBN 9568303022.
- Duffy, Christopher (1996). Siege Warfare: The Fortress in the Early Modern World 1494–1660. New York: Routledge. ISBN 978-0-415-14649-4.
- Ferguson, James (1899). The Scots Brigade in Holland, Vol. 1. Edinburgh: Scottish History Society. p. 310.
- Fruin, Robert Jacobus (1899). Tien jaren uit den Tachtigjarigen Oorlog. 1588–1598. The Hague: Martinus Nijhoff. p. 386. Archived from the original on 24 September 2009. (5th ed.; original published in 1857)
- Gelderblom, Oscar (2000). Zuid-Nederlandse kooplieden en de opkomst van de Amsterdamse stapelmarkt (1578–1630) (in Dutch). Hilversum: Verloren. p. 350. ISBN 978-9065506207.
- van Gelderen, M. (2002). The Political Thought of the Dutch Revolt 1555–1590. Cambridge University Press. ISBN 0521891639.
- Glete, Jan (2002). War and the State in Early Modern Europe: Spain, the Dutch Republic and Sweden as fiscal-military states, 1500–1660. Routledge. ISBN 0415226457.
- Groenveld, Simon (2009). Unie – Bestand – Vrede. Drie fundamentele wetten van de Republiek der Verenigde Nederlanden. Hilversum: Uitgeverij Verloren. p. 200. ISBN 978-9087041274. Archived from the original on 27 June 2024. (in cooperation with H.L.Ph. Leeuwenberg and H.B. van der Weel)
- Israel, Jonathan (1989). Dutch Primacy in World Trade, 1585–1740. Clarendon Press. ISBN 0198211392.
- Israel, Jonathan (1990). Empires and Entrepôts: The Dutch, the Spanish Monarchy, and the Jews, 1585–1713. Continuum International Publishing Group. ISBN 1852850221.
- Israel, Jonathan (1995). The Dutch Republic: Its Rise, Greatness, and Fall 1477–1806. Oxford: Clarendon Press. ISBN 0198730721.
- Israel, Jonathan I. (1997). Conflicts of Empires: Spain, the Low Countries and the Struggle for World Supremacy, 1585–1713. Hambledon Press. ISBN 9780826435538.
- Koenigsberger, Helmut G. (2007). Monarchies, States Generals and Parliaments: The Netherlands in the Fifteenth and Sixteenth Centuries. Cambridge University Press. ISBN 978-0521044370. [2001] paperback
- Marek y Villarino de Brugge, André (2020b). Alessandro Farnese: Prince of Parma: Governor-General of the Netherlands (1545–1592): v. II. Los Angeles: MJV Enterprises, ltd., inc. ISBN 979-8687563130.
- van der Lem, Anton (1995). De Opstand in de Nederlanden (1555–1648) (in Dutch). Uitgeverij Kosmos / Leiden University. Archived from the original on 18 April 2024 – via dutchrevolt.library.universiteitleiden.nl.
- van der Lem, Anton (2019). Revolt in the Netherlands: The Eighty Years War, 1568–1648. London: Reaktion Books. pp. 142–243. ISBN 978-1789140880. Archived from the original on 27 June 2024.
- Lesaffer, Randall (2006). "Siege Warfare and the Early Modern Laws of War". Ius Brabanticum, ius commune, ius gentium (PDF). pp. 87–109. Archived (PDF) from the original on 3 December 2022.
- Mulder, Liek; Doedens, Anne; Kortlever, Yolande (2008). Geschiedenis van Nederland, van prehistorie tot heden. Baarn: HBuitgevers. p. 288. ISBN 978-9055746262.
- Parker, Geoffrey (2004). The Army of Flanders and the Spanish Road 1567–1659 (2nd ed.). Cambridge University Press. ISBN 978-0521543927. paperback
- Palafox y Mendoza, Juan de (1762). "Sitio y socorro de Fuenterrabía y sucesos del año de treinta y ocho". Obras del ilustrissimo Don Juan de Palafox y Mendoza (in Spanish). Vol. X. Gabriel Ramírez. pp. 92–272.
- Picouet, Pierre A. (2020). The Armies of Philip IV of Spain 1621–1665. The Fight for European Supremacy. Helion & Company. ISBN 9781911628613.
- Richer, Estienne (1623). Le Mercure françois (in French). Vol. VIII. Estienne Richer.
- Rooze-Stouthamer, Clasina Martina (2009). De opmaat tot de Opstand: Zeeland en het centraal gezag (1566–1572) (in Dutch). Uitgeverij Verloren. ISBN 978-9087040918.
- Scammel, G.V. (1989). The First Imperial Age: European Overseas Expansion c. 1400–1715. Routledge.
- Tarver, H. Michael; Slape, Emily (2016). The Spanish Empire: A Historical Encyclopedia. ABC-CLIO. ISBN 978-1610694216.
- Tracy, J.D. (2008). The Founding of the Dutch Republic: War, Finance, and Politics in Holland 1572–1588. Oxford University Press. ISBN 978-0199209118.
- Wilson, Peter (2009). Europe's Tragedy: A History of the Thirty Years War. Allen Lane. ISBN 978-0713995923.
- Collin de Pancy, Jacques Albin Simon (1836). Fastes militaires des Belges, ou Histoire des guerres, sièges, conquêtes, expéditions et faits d'armes qui ont illustré la Belgique depuis l'invasion de César jusqu'à nos jours (in French). Brussels: Au Bureau des fastes militaires.
