= Eighty Years' War, 1599–1609 =

Sixth phase of the Eighty Years' War

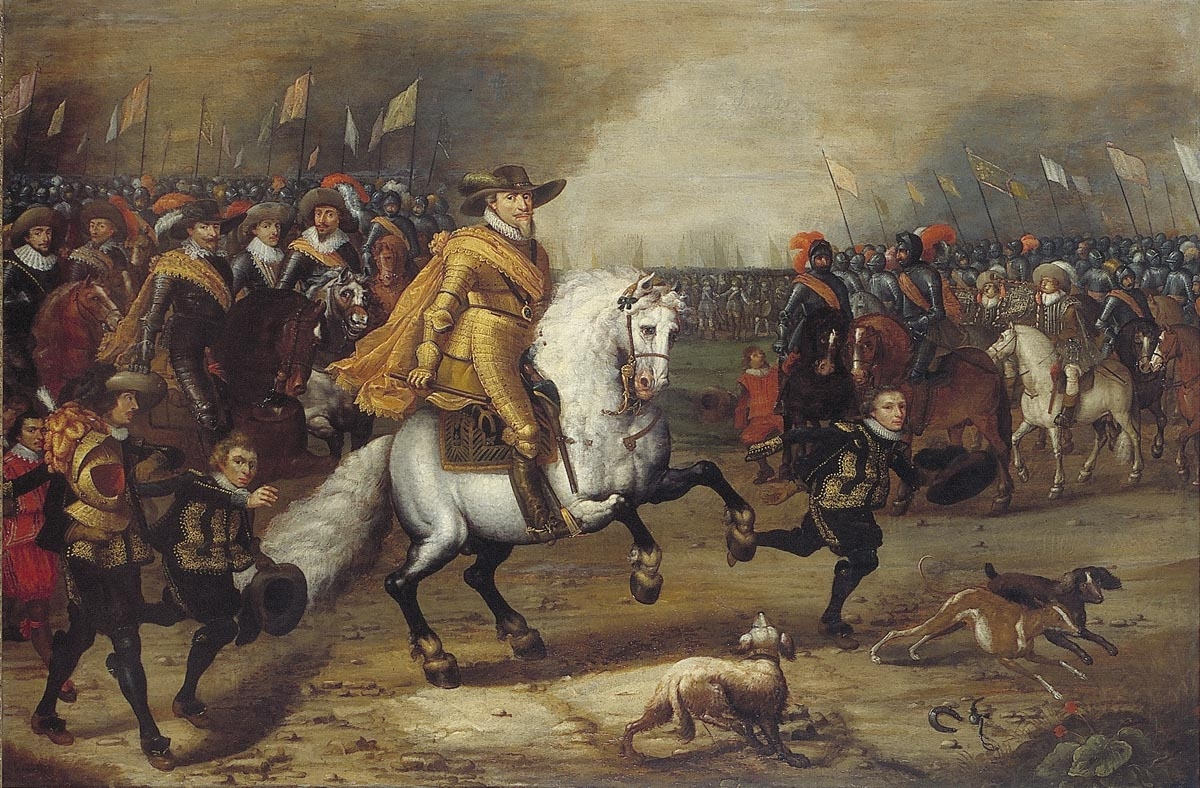
Stadtholder Maurice of Nassau during the 1600 Battle of Nieuwpoort, a tactical Dutch victory for little gain

The years 1599–1609 constituted a phase in the Eighty Years' War (c. 1568–1648) between the Spanish Empire and the emerging Dutch Republic. It followed the Ten Years (1588–1598) that saw significant conquests by the Dutch States Army under the leadership of stadtholders Maurice of Nassau and William Louis of Nassau-Dillenburg, and ended with the conclusion of the Twelve Years' Truce (1609–1621) on 9 April 1609. From 1599 to 1609 the conflict largely settled into a stalemate. The Battle of Nieuwpoort (1600) yielded a Dutch tactical victory without durable strategic gains. Spain recorded successes at the Siege of Ostend (1601–1604) and during Spinola's campaign of 1605–1606, while the Dutch won a naval victory at the Battle of Gibraltar (1607); Spain also went bankrupt that year, and had to suspend payments of its troops in the Low Countries. Financial pressures were among the factors that led both sides, especially Spain, to pursue a ceasefire.

== Background ==
Although Philip II of Spain had bequeathed the Habsburg Netherlands to his elder daughter Isabella and her husband (Philip's nephew) Albert VII, Archduke of Austria on 6 May 1598, they were expected to reconquer and recatholicise the North, which by now was firmly in the hands of the independence-seeking United Provinces. Moreover, the highest military authority of the Army of Flanders remained in the hands of the new king of Spain, Philip III, Isabella's brother. Finally, the Austrian archduke and archduchess had to 'politically obey' (although no details were given how) Philip III, who would also inherit the Netherlands if their marriage remained childless. The unclear division of sovereignty between Brussels and Madrid thus created tensions between them, that would come to light when conflicts arose over who had the authority to make proposals and agreements during the Truce negotiations, that started in 1606–1607.

== European warfare ==
=== Bommelerwaard offensive (1599) ===
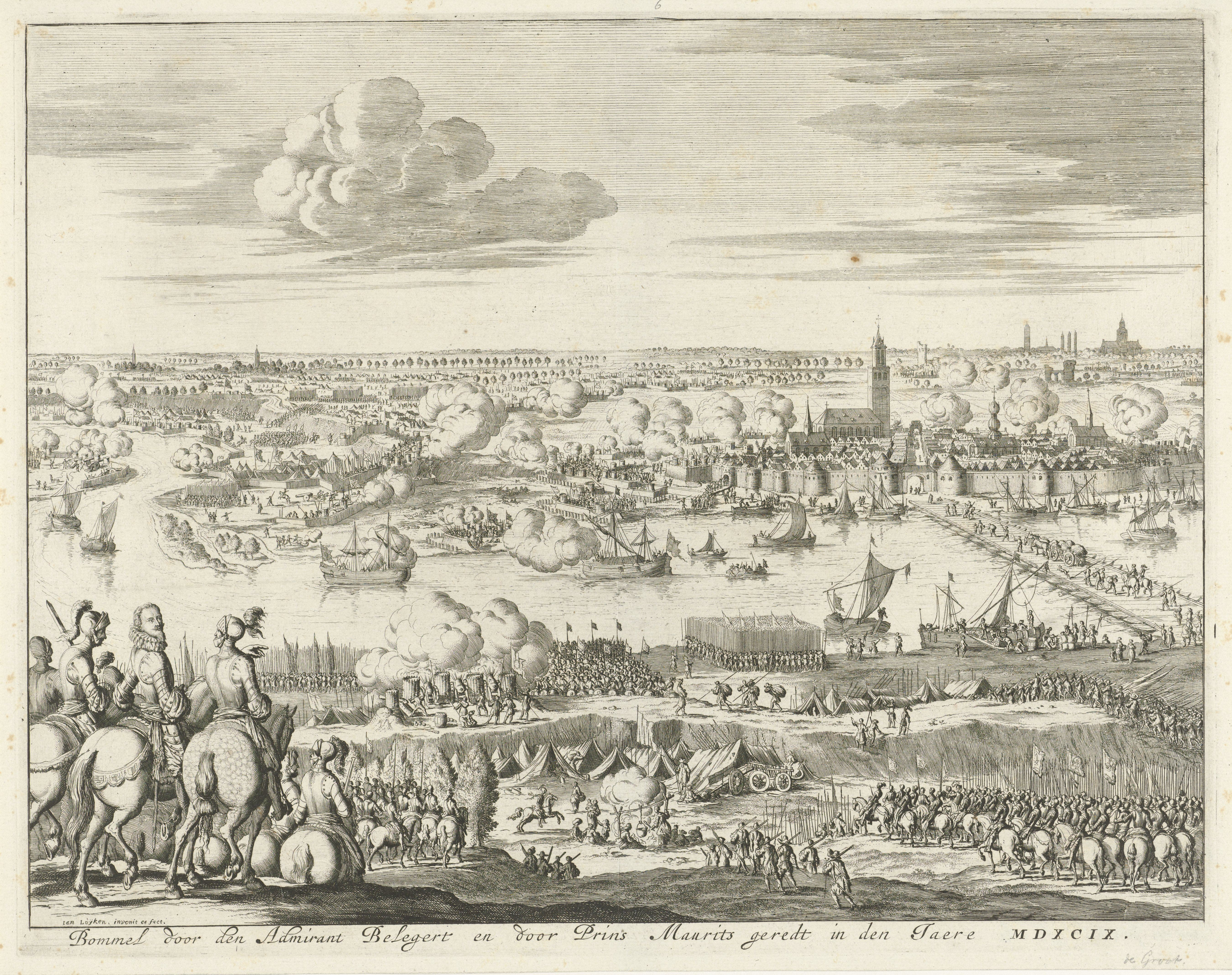
Print of the Siege of Zaltbommel in 1599.

A Spanish strike into Holland was attempted in April 1599 – Francisco de Mendoza, the Admiral of Aragon was ordered by the Archduke of Austria to mount an offensive into the Bommelerwaard. Once this had been taken, the Spanish would then be able to cut Holland off and gain more favourable talks in the peace process. The offensive, however, went awry from the start. Mendoza, with 12,000 soldiers on horseback or foot, tried to go through to Zaltbommel by taking Schenkenschanz on 28 April, but was repelled by the small English garrison. The Spanish moved around the fort however and took Fort Crevecour and constructed Fort Sint-Andries near Heerewaarden. A siege of the town of Zaltbommel by Spanish troops was attempted, but was lifted by the approaching Anglo-Dutch force of 10,000 infantry and 3,000 cavalry led by Maurice of Nassau. The Spanish were defeated in the Siege of Zaltbommel (15 May – 22 July 1599) and subsequent attempts to regain the initiative. Mendoza retreated and the Spanish army then found itself in chaos: mutinies, desertions and sickness took effect.

=== Capture of mutinous forts (early 1600) ===
Maurice took advantage of the widespread insurrection – first he retook Wachtendonk and from there launched a campaign in the surrounding area to retake the only remnants of Spanish forces in the area, at forts Crevecoeur and San Andreas. Fort Crevecoeur gave in easily after Maurice offered them money on the account of the garrison's mutiny. Fort San Andreas was next – the garrison had mutinied against their officers but regarded the fort as their only pledge for the payment of their arrears. After a brief Siege of San Andreas (1600) from 28 January to 6 March, and a failure by a Spanish relief force led by Luis de Velasco to get to them in time, San Andreas was thus duly delivered into Dutch hands.

=== Battle of Nieuwpoort (1600) ===
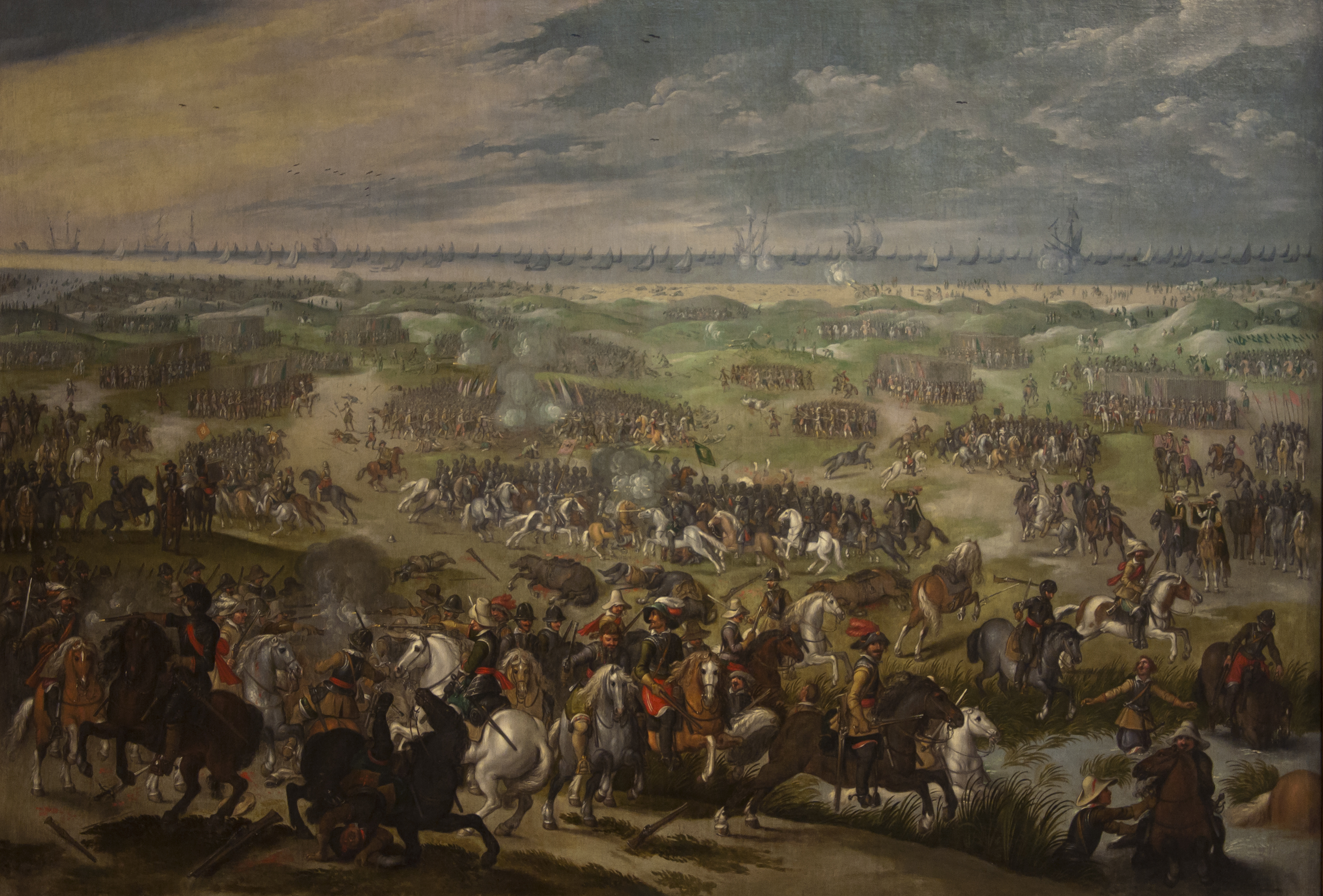
Battle of Nieuwpoort, by Sebastiaen Vrancx

By now, it had become clear that the Spanish hold on the Southern Netherlands was strong. However, control over Zeeland meant that the Dutch Republic could close the estuary of the Scheldt, the entry to the important port of Antwerp. The port of Amsterdam benefited greatly from the blockade of the port of Antwerp, to the extent that merchants in the North began to question the desirability of reconquering the South. A campaign to control the Southern provinces' coast region was launched against Maurice's advice in 1600. Although portrayed as a liberation of the Southern Netherlands, the campaign was chiefly aimed at eliminating the threat to Dutch trade posed by the Spanish-supported Dunkirkers. The Spanish strengthened their positions along the coast, leading to the Battle of Nieuwpoort.

Although the States-General army won great acclaim for itself and its commander by inflicting a surprising defeat of a Spanish army in open battle, Maurice halted the march on Dunkirk and returned to the Northern Provinces. Maurice never forgave the regents, led by van Oldenbarneveld, for being sent on this mission. By now the division of the Low Countries into separate states had become almost inevitable. With the failure to eliminate the Dunkirk threat to trade, the Dutch Republic decided to build up its navy to protect sea trade, which would greatly increase through the creation of the Dutch East Indies Company in 1602. The strengthened Dutch fleets would prove to be a formidable force, hampering Spain's naval ambitions thereafter.

However, peace with France and the secret peace negotiations had temporarily slackened Spain's resolve to pay its troops adequately and this had occasioned the usual widespread mutinies. With the Army of Flanders now temporarily in disarray, Oldenbarnevelt and the States-General spied a strategic opportunity to deal the Archdukes a heavy blow. They forced a deep strike into Flanders on a reluctant Maurice in the direction of the port of Dunkirk that had grown into a hotbed of privateers that did enormous damage to Dutch shipping. Maurice now flung his model army into Flanders after a large amphibious operation from Flushing and started his advance along the coast. This incursion brought an immediate end to the "industrial action" (mutiny) of the Spanish troops, enabling Albert to launch a strike into Maurice's flank. Somewhat hindered by all seven members of the States-General, who tried to micro-manage the campaign as deputies-in-the-field, Maurice was now cornered by Albert near the port of Nieuwpoort and forced to give battle on 2 July 1600. (Note: Thanks in part to its memorable date, the Battle of Nieuwpoort is one that most Dutch people are able to recall.) This was a test by fire of the Dutch army and the new tactics developed by the stadtholders against the still formidable Spanish infantry and Maurice was none too sure about its outcome. However, the new tactics of volley-fire and artillery-supported infantry fighting got the better of the Spanish pikemen and Maurice personally routed the Spaniards in a cavalry charge. The battle proved hard-fought, and strategically worthless, as Maurice retreated thereafter to the safety of Zeeland. Worse for the Dutch, a privateer fleet managed to break the blockade of Dunkirk and wreaked havoc on the Dutch herring fleet, destroying 10% of its Herring Busses in August.

=== Siege of Ostend (1601–1604) ===
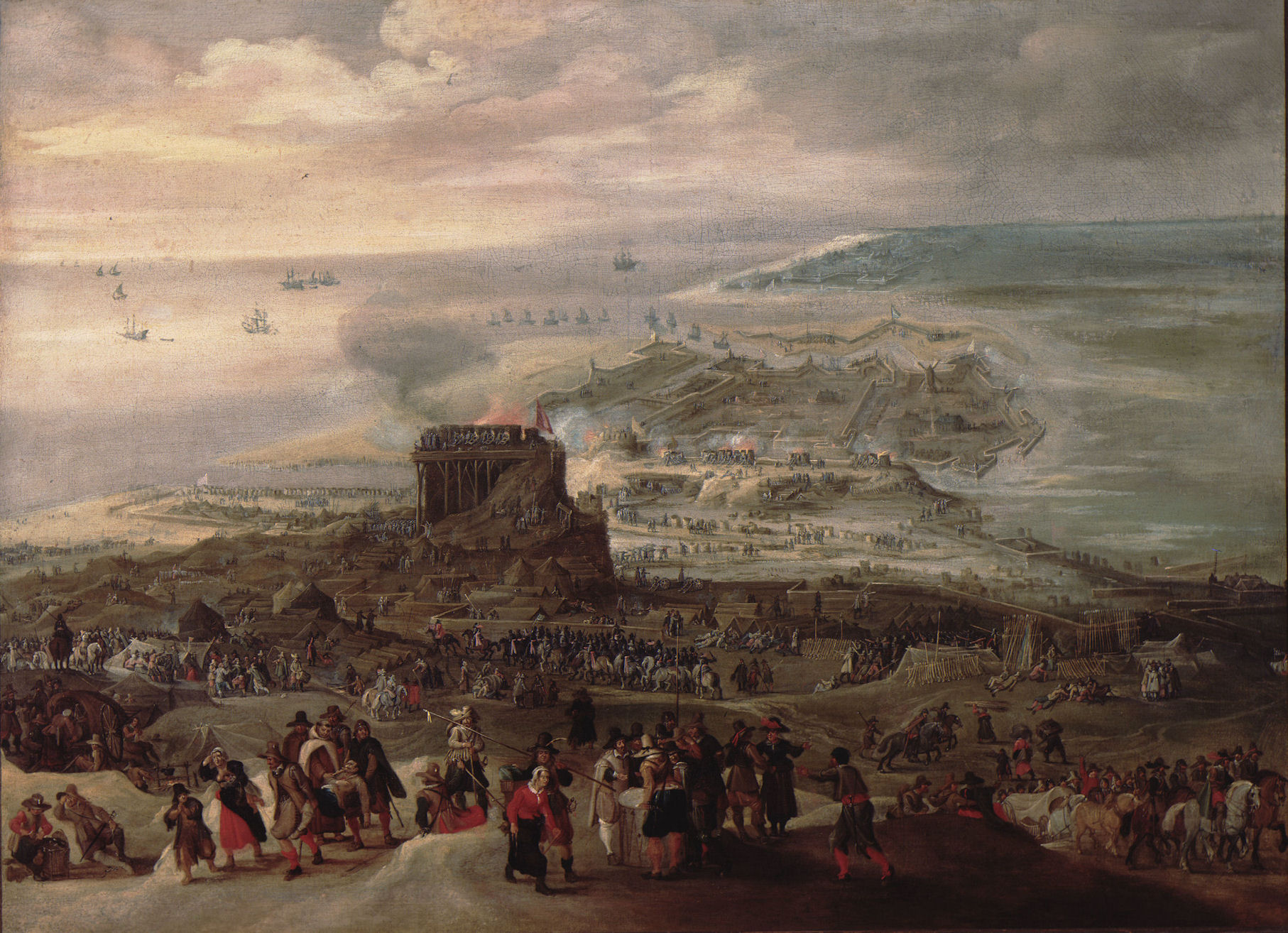
Siege of Ostend (1601–1604). The ruin and devastation of the Siege led to negotiations that produced a Twelve-Year Truce (1609–1621) between Spain and the United Provinces.

The next four years showed an apparent stalemate. The Archdukes decided that before taking on the Republic it was important to subdue the last Protestant enclave on the Flemish coast, the port of Ostend. The siege took three years and eighty days. Meanwhile, the stadtholders mopped up some more Spanish fortresses; Rheinberg capitulated in 1601, the following year in Brabant Grave fell and Sluys and Aardenburg were taken in what was to become States Flanders. Though these victories deprived the Archdukes of much of the propaganda value of their own victory at Ostend, the loss of the city was a severe blow to the Republic, and it brought about another Protestant exodus to the North. Moreover, Maurice twice besieged 's-Hertogenbosch in vain, while the Genovan commander Ambrogio Spinola made his debut; his great military talent would prove a formidable challenge to Maurice.

=== Spinola's 1605–1606 campaign ===
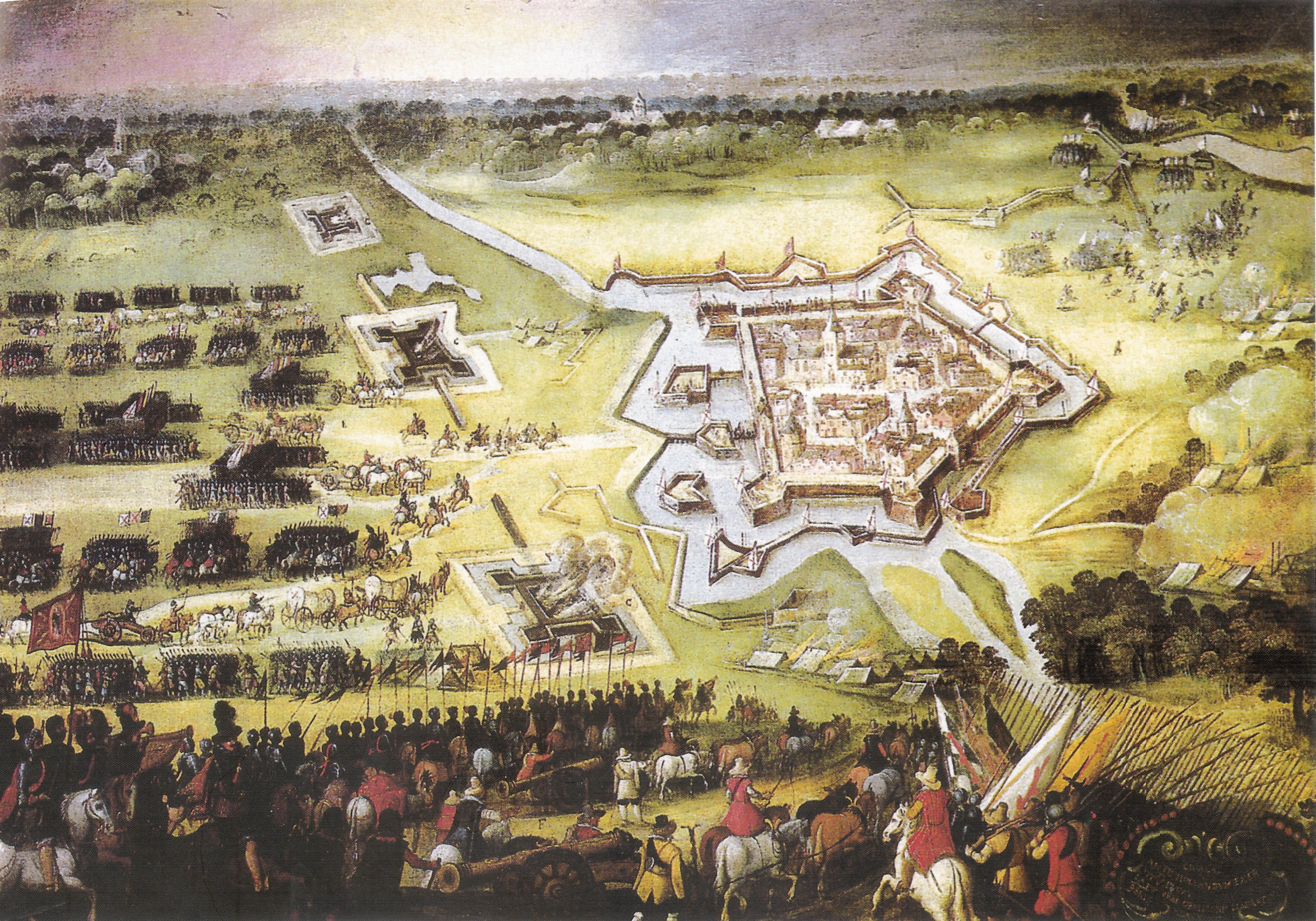
Groenlo relieved by Spinola, November 1606. Maurice's army (right) sounds the retreat.

The supreme command of the Army of Flanders had now been transferred to Spinola, who proved to be a worthy opponent of Maurice. In a brilliant campaign in 1605 he first outwitted Maurice by feigning an attack on Sluys, leaving Maurice far in his rear while he actually attacked the eastern Netherlands by way of Münster, Germany. He soon appeared before Oldenzaal (only recently captured by Maurice) and the predominantly Catholic city opened its gates without firing a shot. Next he captured Lingen. With both towns in Spanish hands, the Dutch had to evacuate Twenthe and retire to the IJssel river. Spinola returned the next year and caused a panic in the Republic when he invaded the Zutphen quarter of Gelderland, showing that the interior of the Republic was still vulnerable to Spanish attack. However, Spinola was satisfied with the psychological effect of his incursion and did not press the attack. Maurice decided on a rare autumn campaign in an attempt to close the apparent gap in the Republic's eastern defences. He retook Lochem, but his siege of Oldenzaal failed in November 1606. This was the last major campaign on both sides before the Truce that was concluded in 1609. Meanwhile, the Dutch States fleet scored a victory in the Battle of Gibraltar (1607).

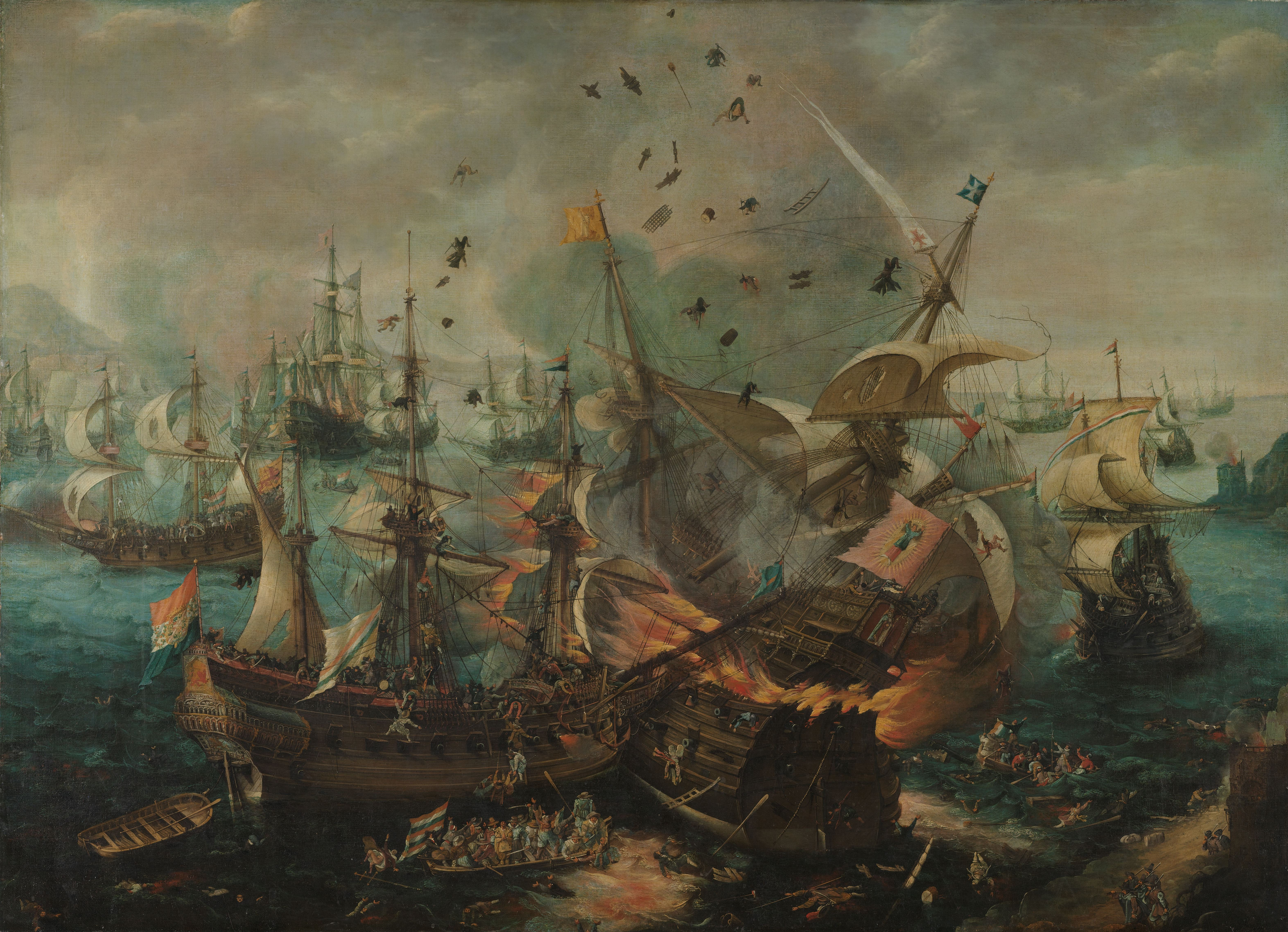
Battle of Gibraltar, 1607: showing the destruction of the Spanish flagship

== Colonial theatre ==
=== Dutch–Portuguese War ===
The war expanded overseas, with the creation of the Dutch colonial empire beginning early in the 17th century with Dutch attacks on Portugal's overseas colonies. (Note: Portugal was part of a dynastic union with Spain, the Iberian Union, until 1640. Portugal and the Netherlands battled for control of Portugal's overseas territories.) By attacking Portugal's overseas possessions, the Dutch forced Spain to divert financial and military resources away from its attempt to quell Dutch independence.

=== Raid on Southern Chile ===
The Dutch–Spanish war also reached South America. In 1600, local Huilliche (a Mapuche subgroup) joined the Dutch corsair Baltazar de Cordes to attack the Spanish settlement of Castro in Chile. While this was an isolated attack, the Spanish believed the Dutch could attempt to ally with the Mapuches and establish a stronghold in southern Chile. The Spanish knew of the Dutch plans to establish themselves at the ruins of Valdivia so they attempted to re-establish Spanish rule there before the Dutch arrived again. The Spanish attempts were thwarted in the 1630s when Mapuches did not allow the Spanish to pass through their territory.

== Aftermath ==
Following Spinola's costly campaign and the naval defeat at Gibraltar, Philip III announced a suspension of payments on 9 November 1607, and the Spanish state went into bankruptcy. The resulting balance of power led to a balance of exhaustion. After decades of war, both sides were finally prepared to open negotiations, and preparations for a truce began.

The strategic result of the Spanish gains of 1605–06 was that the Twenthe and Zutphen quarters were to remain a kind of No man's land until 1633, during which they were forced to pay tribute to the Spanish forces that often roamed there at will. Nevertheless, in Spain the truce was seen as a major humiliation. The truce brought benefits to the Dutch, while Spain saw little, if any, tangible benefit. Not only did the truce bring a virtual recognition of Dutch independence, but also the closure of the river Scheldt to traffic in and out of Antwerp, and the acceptance of Dutch commercial operations in the Spanish and Portuguese colonial maritime lanes.

Both sides now embarked on an intensification of the fortress-building spree that had begun in the mid-1590s, enveloping the Republic in a double belt of fortresses on its outer borders (an outer Spanish and an inner Dutch belt). This belt ran from Emden in the northeast via Bourtange, Coevorden, Zwolle, the line of the IJssel, with Deventer and Zutphen; to Arnhem and Nijmegen, and then west, along the Meuse to Grave, Heusden and Geertruidenberg; and finally south along the line through Bergen op Zoom to Lillo, north of Antwerp, and west again to the coast at Cadzand via Sluys. The Dutch fortresses, mostly outside the provinces of the Union of Utrecht proper, were garrisoned with mercenary troops that, though paid for the account of individual provinces, were under federal command since 1594. The Dutch Staatse leger (States Army) had therefore become a truly federal army, consisting mostly of Scottish, English, German and Swiss mercenaries, but commanded by a Dutch officer corps. This standing army almost trebled in size to 50,000 between 1588 and 1607.

== Bibliography ==
- Bengoa, José (2003). Historia de los antiguos mapuches del sur [History of the ancient Mapuches of the south] (in Spanish). Santiago: Catalonia. ISBN 956-8303-02-2.
- Berger, Eugene Clark (2006). Permanent war on Peru's periphery: Frontier identity and the politics of conflict in 17th century Chile (PDF) (PhD). Vanderbilt University. hdl:1803/13510.
- Duerloo, Luc (2012). Dynasty and Piety: Archduke Albert (1598–1621) and Habsburg Political Culture in an Age of Religious Wars. shgate Publishing, Ltd. ISBN 978-1409443759.
- Glete, J. (2002). War and the State in Early Modern Europe. Spain, the Dutch Republic and Sweden as Fiscal-Military States, 1500–1660. Routledge. ISBN 0-415-22645-7.
- Groenveld, Simon (2009). Unie – Bestand – Vrede. Drie fundamentele wetten van de Republiek der Verenigde Nederlanden. Hilversum: Uitgeverij Verloren. p. 200. ISBN 978-9087041274. (in cooperation with H.L.Ph. Leeuwenberg and H.B. van der Weel)
- Groenveld, Simon; Leeuwenberg, Huib (2020). De Tachtigjarige Oorlog. Opstand en consolidatie in de Nederlanden (ca. 1560–1650). Derde editie (in Dutch). Zutphen: Walburg Pers. p. 750. ISBN 978-9462495661. (e-book; original publication 2008; in cooperation with M. Mout and W. Zappey)
- Israel, Jonathan (1995). The Dutch Republic: Its Rise, Greatness, and Fall 1477–1806. Oxford: Clarendon Press. ISBN 0-19-873072-1.
- van der Lem, Anton (2019). Revolt in the Netherlands: The Eighty Years War, 1568–1648. London: Reaktion Books. p. 143. ISBN 978-1789140880.
- Scammel, G.V. (1989). The First Imperial Age: European Overseas Expansion c. 1400–1715. Routledge.
