= Siege of Zaltbommel =

1599 action during the Eighty Years' and Anglo–Spanish wars

- Part of the Eighty Years' War & the Anglo–Spanish War
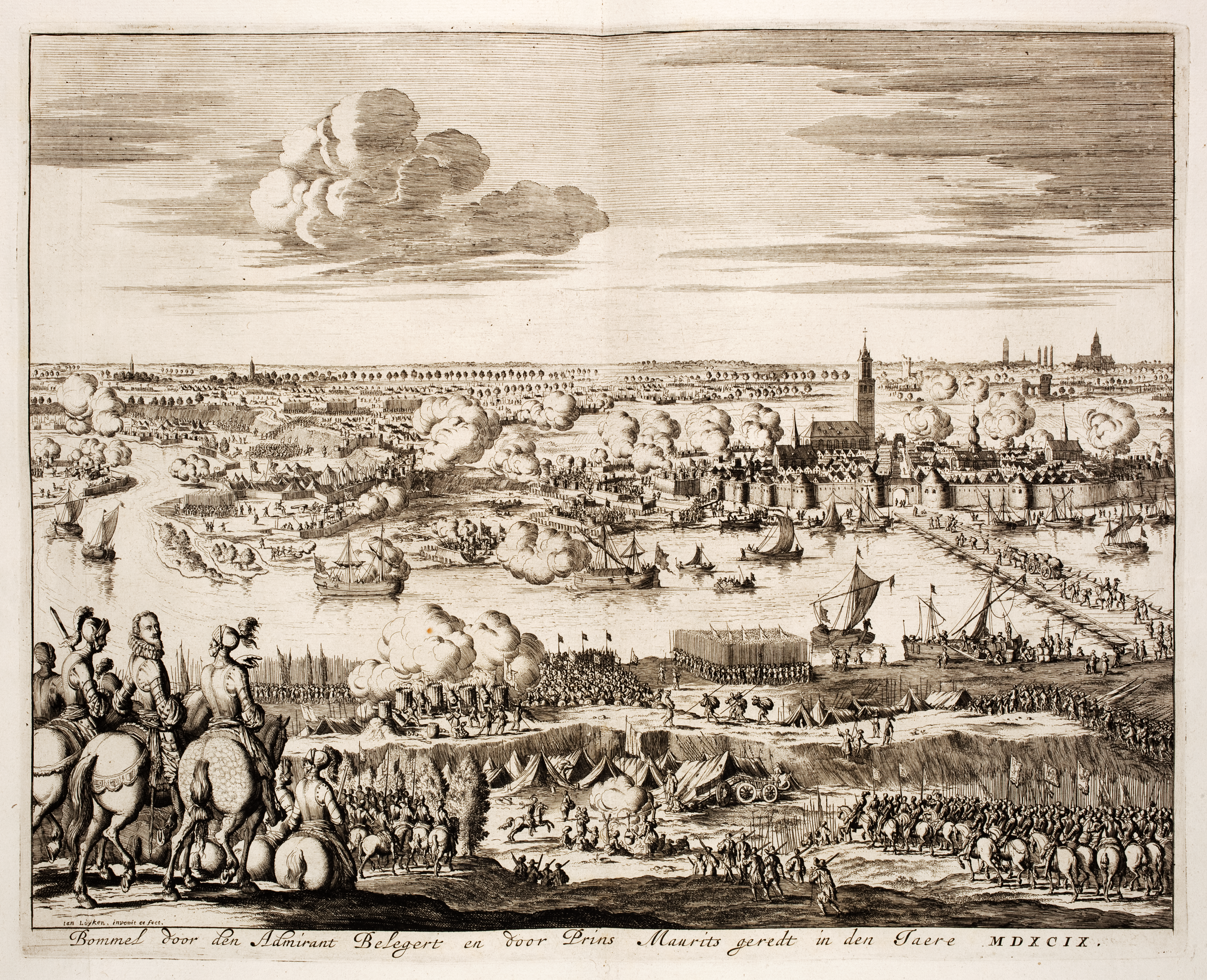
- Siege of Zaltbommel by the Spanish in 1599 by Hugo Grotius
Date	15 May – 22 July 1599
Location	Zaltbommel, Bommelerwaard (present-day the Netherlands)
Result	Dutch and English victory: Mutinies in the Spanish army (Note: The 3,000 besieged soldiers at Fort San Andreas mutinied); War opens up in Southern Netherlands

Belligerents
Dutch Republic; England	Spain

Commanders and leaders
(Dutch Republic) Maurice of Orange (England) Francis Vere	(Spain) Francisco de Mendoza

Strength
12,000	12,000

Casualties and losses
500	2,000

The siege of Zaltbommel was a campaign that took place during the Eighty Years' War and the Anglo–Spanish War from 15 May to 22 July 1599. The Spanish led by Francisco López de Mendoza y Mendoza launched an offensive campaign around Bommelerwaard, which was defended by an Anglo-Dutch force under the command of Maurice of Orange. A siege on the town of Zaltbommel by Spanish troops was attempted but they had to lift the siege and were defeated in subsequent attempts to regain the initiative. Mendoza retreated and the Spanish army then found itself in chaos: mutinies took effect and as a result further operations were suspended for a number of years. As a result, the Dutch and English followed with a counter-offensive in the Spanish Netherlands.

== Background ==
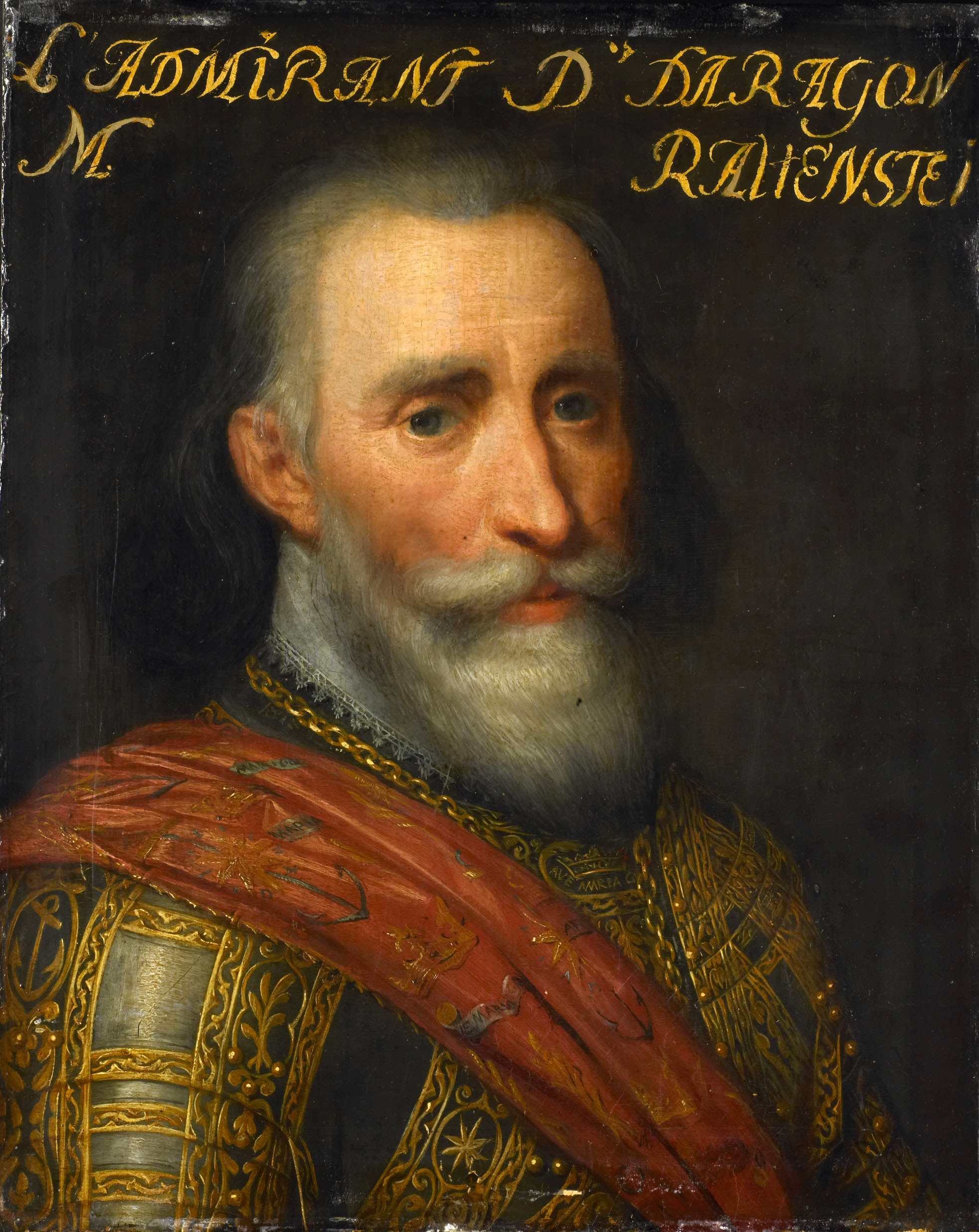
Portrait of Francisco de Mendoza by Jan van Ravesteyn

In 1572 the city of Zaltbommel had declared independence from Spanish authority and had switched their allegiance with the Sea Beggars. The city then became a target for the Spanish and was besieged by them as a distraction to the siege at Leiden. The city however withstood the siege and in the ten years campaign leading up to 1599 the States General of the Netherlands had captured the area, led by Maurice of Orange. The Spanish troops were, however, able to recover, and made a number of attacks during which the Spanish were beaten off almost every time. Zaltbommel had long been an important city for the States-General, because it was a border fortress. Maurice knew of its strategic importance and from 1580 the city was strengthened under the guidance of Adriaen Anthonisz. Several ravelins and bastions were built around the city but the walls of Zaltbommel were in need of significant repair. Maurice however made sure that Zaltbommel was fully prepared for a siege, not just for the soldiers but also for the towns population with a good deal of food and supply. A number of measures were applied, between the unfinished defences; pontoon bridges were constructed so that troops and supplies could be easily fed into the city. The threat to the area occurred when the Spanish wanted to reclaim all the land that they had lost during the ten-year campaign.

In April 1599 the Spanish army stationed in Gelderland which was led by Francisco de Mendoza, the Admiral of Aragon was ordered by the Archduke of Austria to mount an offensive into the Bommelerwaard. Once this has been taken the Spanish would then be able to cut Holland off. On April 17 the Archduke left a section of troops to cover the Rhine and two days later Mendoza's force marched to Schenkenschans with 12,000 infantry and cavalry along with a siege train. Mendoza tried to go through to Zaltbommel by taking Schenkenschanz on April 28, but the English garrison there were able to repel the Spanish with heavy loss and were subsequently relieved. At the same time the main bulk of the Anglo-Dutch army under Maurice marched from the Overijssel to counter the Spanish moves. Maurice's force numbered 10,000 infantry and 3,000 cavalry with numerous artillery and a large supply train. They arrived in quick time since the army was transported mostly by boat, via the inland waters and the sea.

== Campaign ==
On 4 May, after the failure of the attack on Schenkenschanz, the Spanish moved around the fort and thus crossed the Meuse (Dutch: Maas) between Kessel and Theren, and invaded the island of Bommelerwaard. Upon the arrival of more troops at Tieler and Bommelerwaard, Spanish troops focused first on Fort Crèvecoeur which barred the way; this was taken quickly and the siege of Zaltbommel began. Maurice rapidly concentrated his forces in and around the city of Zaltbommel, throwing up entrenchments, while he sent a detached force to hold the town of Alst. Two days later the Spanish under Mendoza delivered a furious assault along the lines around Zaltbommel, which was repulsed with heavy losses. Despite this Mendoza continued his approaches, and planted guns and dug trenches, while skirmishes were a daily occurrence. The Anglo-Dutch force was fully prepared however using the river to its maximum potential. They sent 280 vessels, several mounted with guns; meanwhile on land 379 wagons were dispatched with provisions, and 356 horses were collected for dragging the guns.

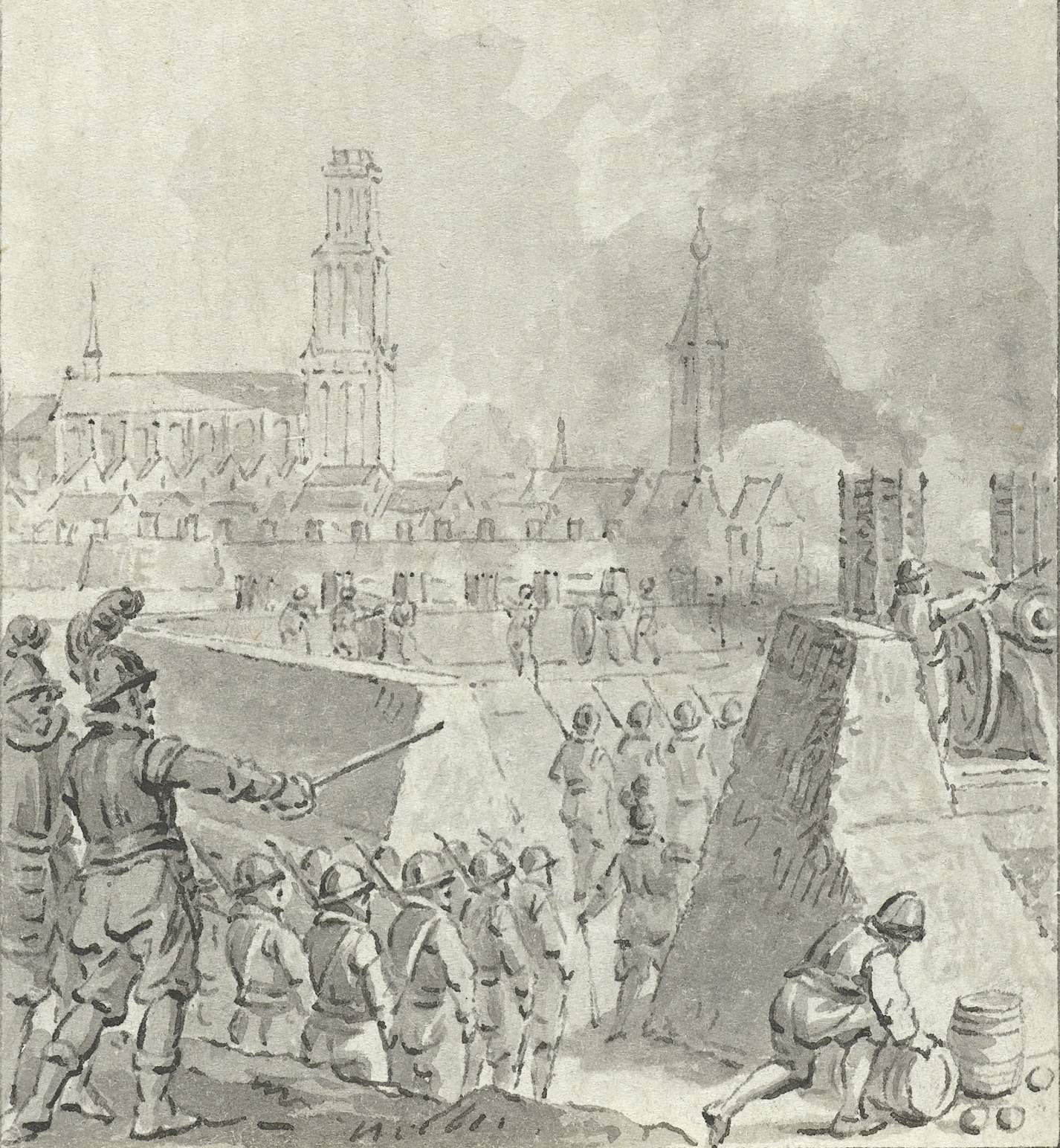
Siege of Zaltbommel, 1599, engraving by Jacobus Buys

On June 13 Maurice was able to open a tremendous fire on the Spanish camp, which obliged the Spanish to raise the siege which Mendoza hoped would only be temporary. Mendoza retreated across the island and began the construction of a formidable fortress at the eastern end, facing the isle of Voorn to the west of Heerewaarden. This fort was named San Andres in honour of Mendoza's colleague, the Cardinal Margrave Andrew of Burgau. Maurice exerted himself to hinder the progress of Fort San Andres with a bombardment; the Spanish though constructed two bastions towards the Waal, two towards the Maas, and a fifth inland, with connecting curtains with the rivers serving as a ditch. Maurice planted guns on the opposite bank, and there was a heavy cannonade, but for many days the two armies were comparatively inactive.

On June 24 a force under Count William Louis of Nassau and Sir Horace Vere crossed the river, and by break of day they had thrown up a crescent formation at Heerewaarden a short distance from San Andres. The next day, 3,000 Spaniards and Italians encouraged by several monks, launched a furious assault on the half-moon, forced their way through the palisades, and fought hand-to-hand and at push of pike. Vere, aided by the Scottish Colonel Edmunds, defended the position and the Spaniards were eventually repulsed with heavy losses. A Scottish colonel Murray, an ageing veteran of the Dutch revolt by this time, was killed when the English and Scots launched successful a counter-attack after the Spanish had fled from their camp.

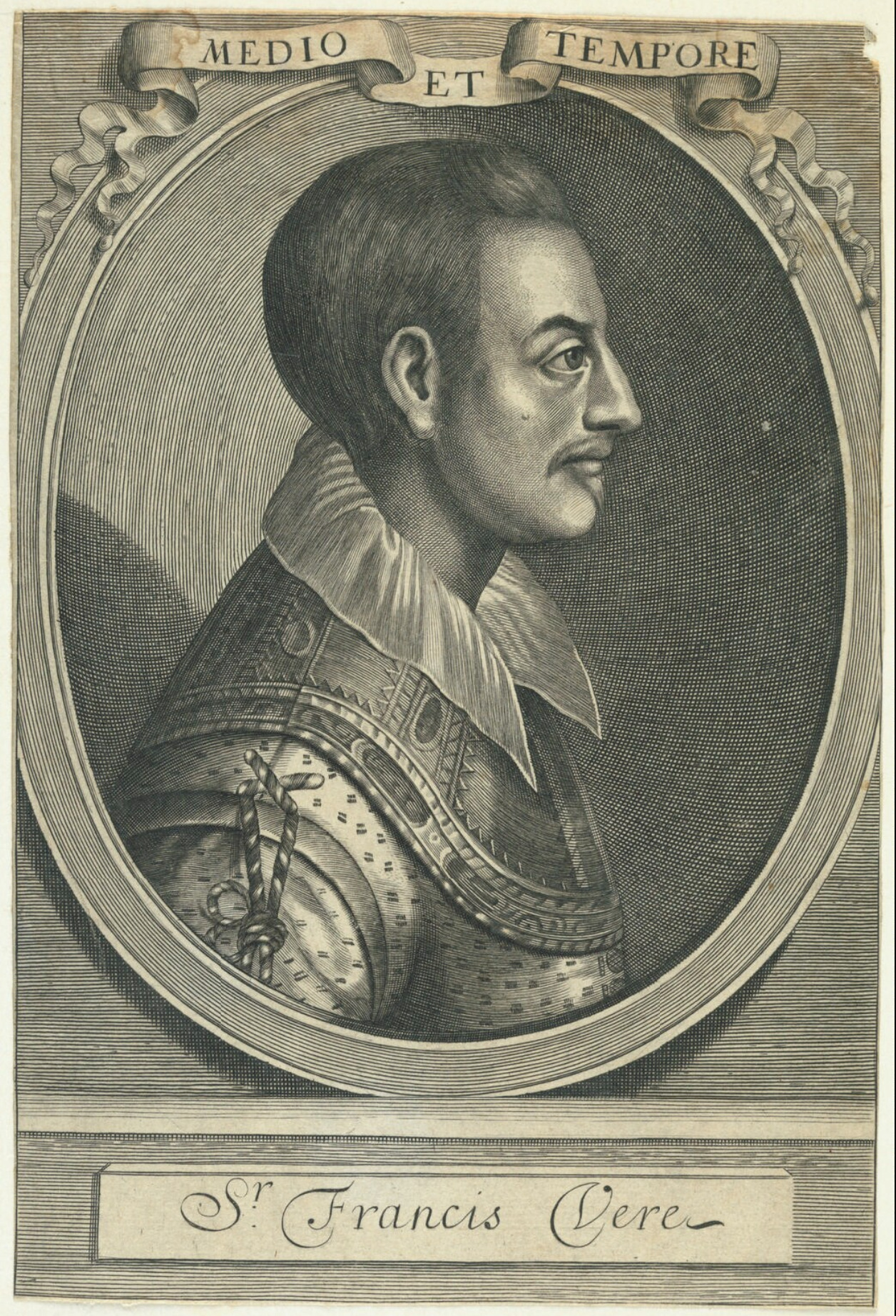
Sir Francis Vere

Maurice meanwhile then decided the only way to save the critical situation was to supply the defenders of Zaltbommel by connecting Heerewaarden with Voorn by a bridge. Maurice's engineers took fourteen flat bottomed ships that had supplied the army, stripped them of their rigging, then anchored them to a line crossing the Waal from a point east of Tuil to the harbour at Zaltbommel. They then constructed a plank roadway across the ships which was wide enough to allow two wagons to pass in opposite directions. Soon after a fortified position was constructed for its protection at Lithoijen, on the Brabant side and soon afterwards supplies came into the city. The military advantage gained here was incalculable

To prevent the Spanish from reaching the ship bridge and encircling from the West, Maurice then ordered the piercing of the dikes near Gameren thus flooding the countryside there. Soon after Sir Francis Vere crossed the river with 6,000 men, and after doing so then made a successful attack on a Spanish position which they called Durango. The position was stormed and as a result the Spanish were on the verge of being totally cut off. This was too much for the dejected Spanish; morale slumped and Mendoza and his second in command openly clashed over the leadership of the army. Soldiers went unpaid and underfed and many were poorly armed. Desertion rates increased daily and there were rumours of potential mutiny. Mendoza's problems were adding and he saw that Zaltbbommel was becoming an impossibility to take and ordered a retreat from Bommelerwaart itself. When the Dutch and English learned of the Spanish retreat, a sortie was made on the former Spanish positions around Zaltbommel, who then looted the abandoned Spanish camp. They captured weapons, women and children, and sick prisoners, but most were soon released.

By July 22 Mendoza had retreated with the loss of 2,000 men, thus completing the victory for the States and English forces. With the Spanish gone Maurice then counterattacked at several places in the eastern area of Bommelerwaard that had been taken by Mendoza. Doetinchem was recaptured by William Louis on 25 August 1599.

== Aftermath ==
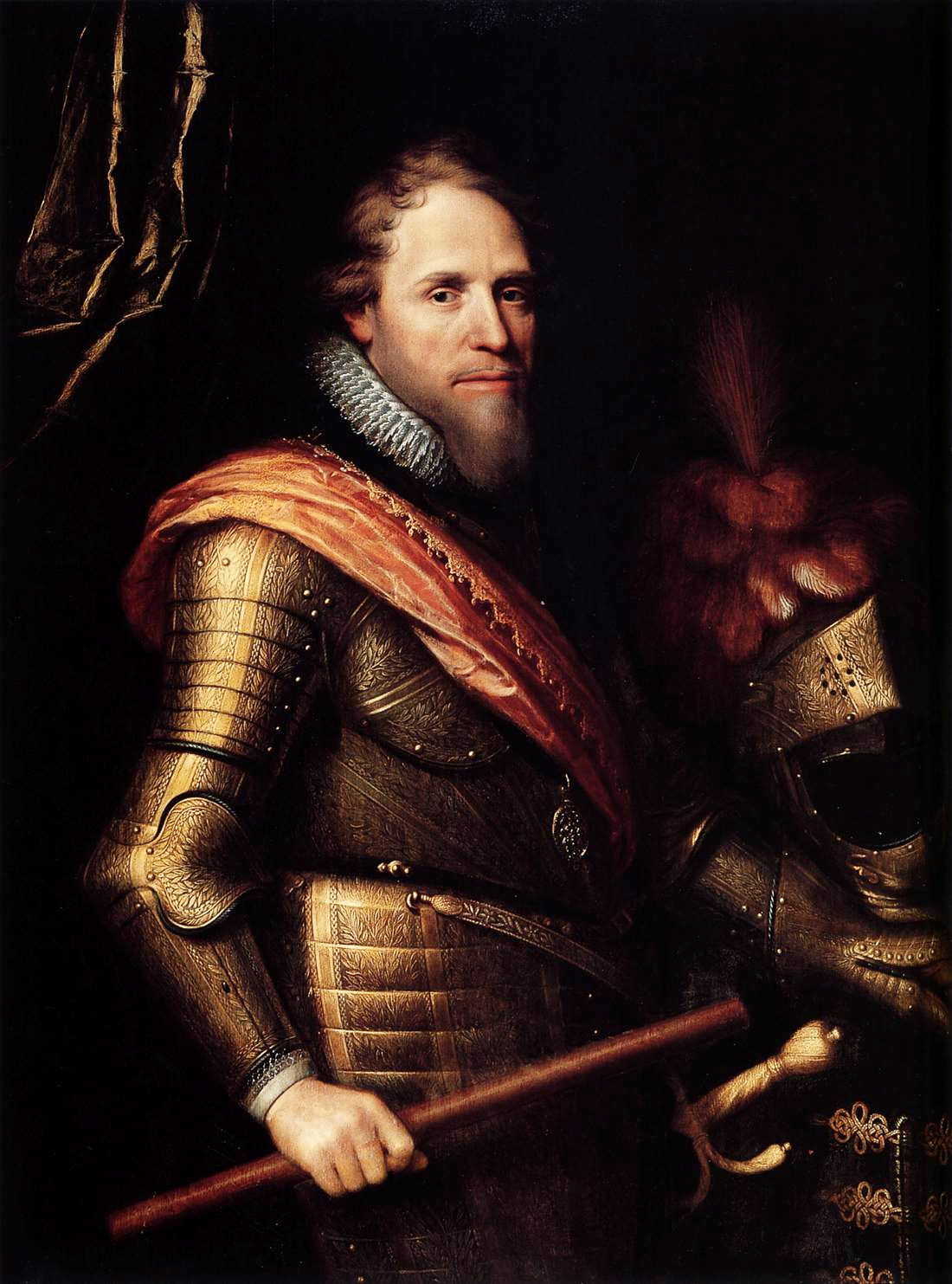
Maurice of Orange by Michiel Jansz. van Mierevelt

With the siege over and the Spanish threat subsided, Maurice had now eradicated the Spanish from the whole of Bommelerwaard, so much so that any further attacks were not worth considering for the rest of the year. Before he retreated Mendoza placed 3,000 men inside Fort San Andreas but less than a year later they were under siege by the Anglo-Dutch; they mutinied and were sold to Maurice for their arrears of pay.

The whole campaign on Bommelerwaard had been an abysmal failure for the Spanish. They were dealt a fatal blow to their campaign to expand the Spanish Netherlands north of the Mass. Vere reported to Robert Cecil after the campaign that the Spanish army was so wearied and discontented that the soldiers 'disbanded in heaps'. In addition there was no likelihood of good government among them until the coming of the Archduke. Worse was to follow with the disbandment; a series of mutinies occurred that forced any further Spanish operations to be put on hold as the States and English army now made a counter-offensive.

The following year the Dutch senate led by Johan van Oldenbarneveldt saw the chaos in the Spanish army and decided the time was ripe for a focal point of the war to be concentrated in Catholic Flanders. Van Oldenbarneveld ordered Maurice to take the fight there and complied, but only after a bitter dispute. Maurice's army with a sizeable contingent of the English army under Francis Vere used Ostend as a base to invade Flanders. Their aim was to conquer the privateer stronghold city of Dunkirk. In 1600 they advanced toward Dunkirk, and in a pitched battle the Anglo-Dutch inflicted a rare defeat on the Tercio led Spanish army at the Battle of Nieuwpoort in which the English played a major part. Despite not capturing Dunkirk the Anglo-Dutch forced the Spanish away from the heart of the Dutch Republic and thus secured a number of important towns (Grave & Rheinberg) whilst the Spanish were distracted by the siege of Ostend.

== Bibliography ==
- Borman, Tracy (1997). Sir Francis Vere in the Netherlands, 1589-1603: A Re-evaluation of His Career as Sergeant Major General of Elizabeth I's Troops. University of Hull.
- Canete, Hugo A (2012). La Guerra de Frisia. Ed Platea. ISBN 9788493886349.
- Dalton, Charles (2012). Life and Times of General Sir Edward Cecil, Viscount Wimbledon, Colonel of an English Regiment in the Dutch Service, 1605-1631, and One of His Majesty. HardPress. ISBN 9781407753157.
- Duerloo, Luc (2012). Dynasty and Piety: Archduke Albert (1598-1621) and Habsburg Political Culture in an Age of Religious Wars. shgate Publishing, Ltd. ISBN 9781409443759.
- Dunthorne, Hugh (2013). Britain and the Dutch Revolt 1560-1700. Cambridge University Press. ISBN 9780521837477.
- Markham, Clement (2007). The Fighting Veres: Lives Of Sir Francis Vere And Sir Horace Vere. Kessinger Publishing. ISBN 978-1432549053.
- Honan, Park (2005). Christopher Marlowe:Poet & Spy. Oxford University Press. ISBN 9780191622793.
- MacCaffrey, Wallace T (1994). Elizabeth I: War and Politics, 1588-1603. Princeton University: Princeton Paperbacks. ISBN 9780691036519.
- Randall, David (2011). "Netherlands Expedition". Encyclopaedia of Tudor England. Santa Barbara, California: ABC-CLIO. pp. 790–791. ISBN 9781598842982.
- Rowse A. L (2006). Expansion of Elizabethan England. University of Wisconsin Press. ISBN 978-0299188245.
- 't Hart, Marjolein (2014). The Dutch Wars of Independence: Warfare and Commerce in the Netherlands 1570-1680. Abingdon: Routledge. ISBN 978-0-415-73422-6.
- van Nimwegen, Olaf (2010). The Dutch Army and the Military Revolutions, 1588-1688 Volume 31 of Warfare in History Series. Boydell & Brewer. ISBN 9781843835752.
- van der Hoeven, Marco (1997). Exercise of Arms: Warfare in the Netherlands, 1568-1648 Volume 1 of History of warfare. Brill. ISBN 9789004107274.
