= Siege of Schenckenschans (1599) =

1599 siege

Siege of Schenkenschans
- Part of the Eighty Years' War & the Anglo–Spanish War
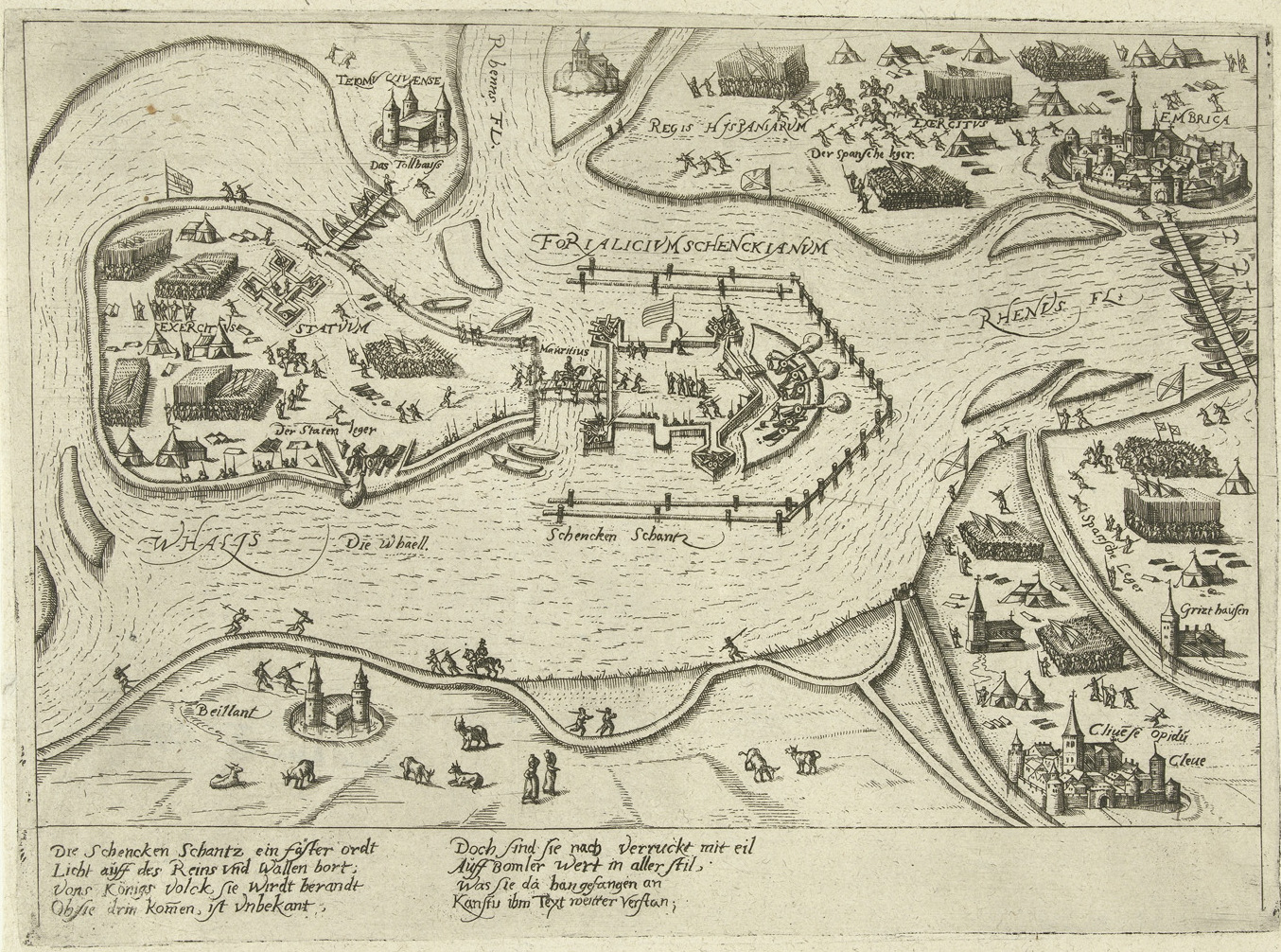
- Siege of Schenkenschans – print by Frans Hogenberg
Date	28 April – 2 May 1599
Location	Schenkenschanz (present-day Germany)
Result	Dutch and English victory

Belligerents
England; Dutch Republic	Spain

Commanders and leaders
(Dutch Republic) Maurice of Orange	(Spain) Francisco de Mendoza (Spain) Frederik van den Bergh

Strength
900 (Schenkenschans); 800 cavalry (relief)	17,000 troops 2,000 cavalry

Casualties and losses
Light	400

The siege of Schenkenschans was a siege that took place from 28 April to 2 May 1599 as part of the Eighty Years' War and the Anglo–Spanish War. Schenkenschans was garrisoned largely by English troops and was besieged by a Spanish force led by Francisco de Mendoza. The siege failed with losses and the Spanish were forced to retreat when a relief force arrived.

== Background ==
In 1586, Maartin Schenck and Roger Williams had been campaigning in the County of Westphalia raiding as far as Kaiserswerth. In Gelderland a sconce, called Schenckenschanz, or Schenck's Fortification, was built at the confluence of the Waal and the Rhine. Maurice of Orange strengthened the sconce later on; earthworks were built which formed two bastions. Bridges were built over the moats and a continuous series of posts where signals could be relayed. From this important strategic location, the sconce would inevitably be subjected to attack. By 1599, Maurice's army was stationed along the line of rivers ready to defend Schenckenschans, Nijmegen, and Doesburg. Schenckenschans itself composed of eight hundred troops and one hundred pioneers, almost all of them Englishmen who had served under Francis Vere (who was away in the Hague).

Francisco de Mendoza, the Admiral of Aragon, was stationed in Gelderland and was ordered by the Archduke of Austria to capture Schenkenschans—to the Spanish called "The Key to the islands". Once won, the Spanish would then be able to cut Holland off. On 17 April the Archduke left a section of troops to cover the Rhine and two days later Mendoza's force marched to Schenkenschans.

== Siege ==
On 28 April the armies of Mendoza and Frederik van den Bergh met at Griethausen around Kleve. The combined force totalled some 19,000 men including 2,000 cavalry. They then bridged over the Rhine and used boats between Rees and Emmerich and from there managed to drive the Dutch ships downstream. The Spanish set up batteries from the two banks—one bank held nine pieces of artillery whilst the other had twelve. These then opened fire on the fort but in response however the fort replied with vigour and an artillery duel began following which some exposed Spanish guns were knocked out. Mendoza was unable to create any damage on the English defences and set up a formal siege instead.

Being heavily outnumbered the garrison of Schenkenschans was in need of relief. On the night of 1 May a Dutch force under Walloon Colonel Claude La Barlotte landed with an army of five thousand men upstream of the Mass in secrecy. He disembarked at Hedel in the Bommelerwaard and when news of this approach was heard by Mendoza he thought it better to break off the siege and engage the force. The English inside the sconce were relieved two days later by a cavalry force of 800 that Maurice had sent ahead. La Barlotte's force escaped to the north to Zaltbommel with Mendoza's force in pursuit.

== Aftermath ==
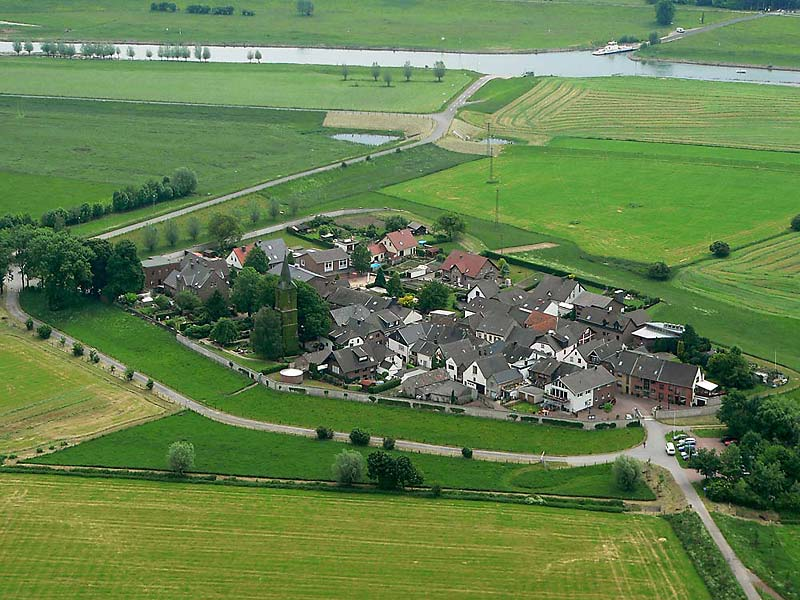
Present day Schenkenschanz in Germany

On 11 May Mendoza, with a new plan, took the fort at Crevecoeur by surprise and planned to use it as a base for an offensive. Maurice however was already aware of these plans and had hoped that they had to try to launch an attack against Schenkenschans again and therefore entrenched there. When it became clear to him that Mendoza's target was actually Zaltbommel he marched his men straight there. Under the small force of La Barlotte, Zaltbommel would not be able to stand against Mendoza's more numerous force. The Spanish attempt however to lay siege to Zaltbommel ended in disaster too.

Schenkenschans remained firmly in States hands until 1630 when by betrayal, money was offered to one of the commanders in the sconce and was then handed over to the Spanish. During the siege of 1635–1636, the Dutch overpowered the sconce, with the majority of the garrison being killed and the fort being looted.
