= Siege of Schenkenschans =

1635–36 battle of the Eighty Years' War

- Part of the Eighty Years' War and the Franco-Spanish War
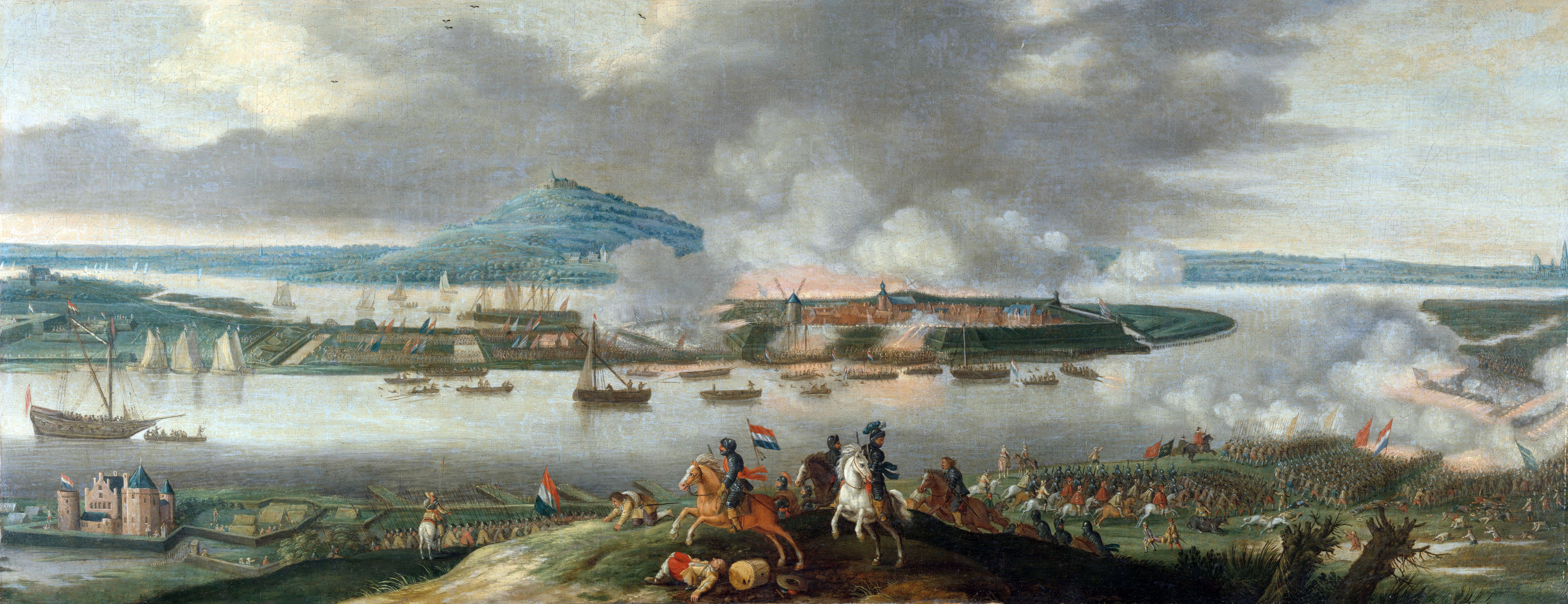
- Siege of Schenkenschans by Gerrit van Santen.
Date	30 July 1635 – 30 April 1636
Location	Schenkenschanz (present-day Germany)
Result	First siege: Spanish victory Second siege: Dutch victory

Belligerents
Dutch Republic	Spain

Commanders and leaders
(Dutch Republic) Frederick Henry (Dutch Republic) John Maurice	First siege: (Spanish Empire) Cardinal-Infante Ferdinand; Second siege: (Spanish Empire) Eyndhouts † (Spain) Gomar de Fourdin

Strength
30,000	1,500

Casualties and losses
Very high	900

The siege of Schenkenschans (30 July 1635 – 30 April 1636) was a major siege of the Eighty Years' War. In a successful campaign the Army of Flanders, commanded by Spanish general Cardinal-Infante Ferdinand of Austria, captured Schenkenschans along with a number of important towns, reversing recent Dutch gains and opening the Dutch Republic to a possible invasion. The Dutch Stadtholder, Fredrick Henry, pushed the republic's military efforts to their limit to recapture the fortress of Schenkenschans to counter the threat to the exposed Dutch heartland. He succeeded in doing so after a costly nine-month siege.

== Background ==
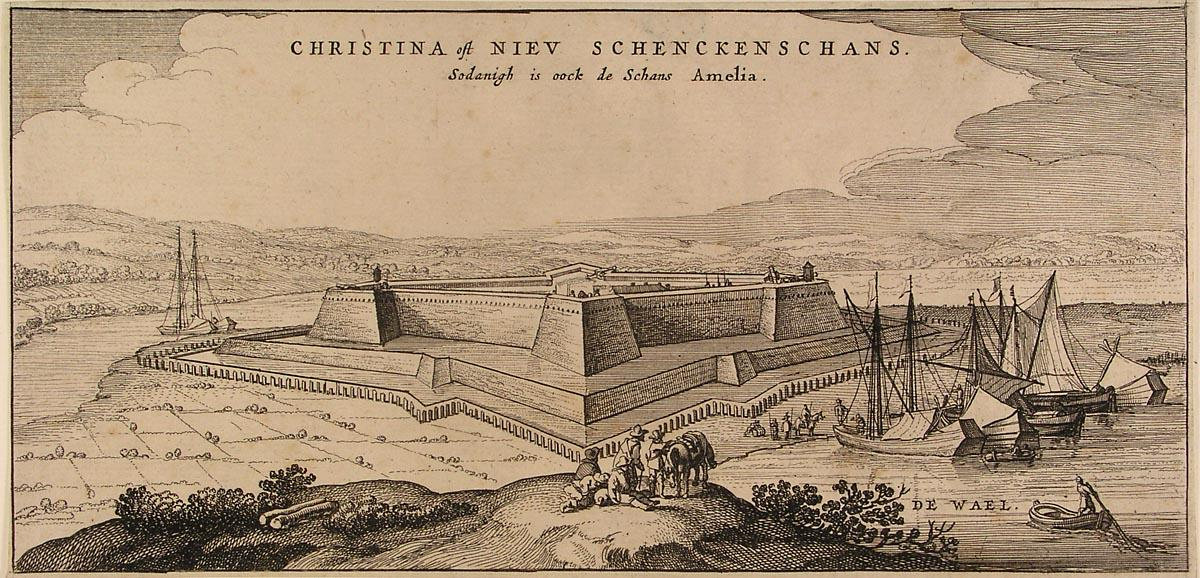
The Schenkenschans by Claes Janszoon Visscher

The fortress with the name Schenkenschans (English: Schenk's Sconce, Spanish: Esquenque) was founded by the German mercenary commander Maarten Schenk van Nydeggen on the orders of stadtholder Adolf van Nieuwenaar in 1586. Its location was strategically chosen, because it dominated the place where in 1586 the Rhine and the Waal River forked (currently these rivers split further west; the fork was moved to improve river traffic and prevent flooding). An army that approaches from the east there had a choice of marching along the right bank of the Rhine, through the "back door" of the Dutch Republic, thrusting straight to the Dutch heartland; or taking a more southerly route through the Betuwe; or taking the third route west, entering the area between the Waal and the Meuse River. In all three cases the rivers formed an ideal supply line. However, that supply line was cut off by the Schenkenschans.

The Dutch dominated the area (that also includes nearby Cleves) during most of the war with Spain. The fortress was much improved after its humble beginnings and in its new form was a fine example of star fort architecture. In 1599 it was besieged unsuccessfully by Spanish forces led Francisco de Mendoza.

== Capture by the Spanish Army ==
In 1635 the Dutch Republic concluded an alliance with France with the objective of taking on the Spanish Army of Flanders from two sides, in the hope of breaking the strategic stalemate in the Eighty Years' War and dividing up the Spanish Netherlands between the two partners in the alliance. The Dutch and French invaded from two sides in June 1635, and joined forces in the valley of the Meuse in July, while the Spanish field army under the Cardinal-Infante fell back to cover behind the well prepared defences of Brussels instead of risking envelopment by the massive invading Franco-Dutch force, turning the campaign into one of attrition. The invading armies (60,000 strong) captured a few smaller towns before investing Leuven. But this siege ended in a fiasco because of bad logistics and organization, and because the French army was decimated by the plague. This failure allowed the Spanish forces to take the initiative and soon the invaders were forced into a headlong retreat.

The Cardinal-Infante forced the weakened invading Franco–Dutch armies towards the Dutch border. From there, he made a north-easterly thrust to the Rhine in the direction of Cleves. Despite desperate efforts, the Dutch and their allies were not able to prevent Spanish forces from taking the towns of Limbourg, Gennep, Diest, and Goch around the south and east of the Republic. A party of 500 German mercenaries under Lt.-Col. Eyndhouts, roaming on the Cardinal-Infrante's left flank, managed to surprise the unprepared fortress of Schenkenschans that at the time had a garrison of only 120, on the night of 27/28 July. The garrison were massacred. and the Cardinal-Infante had a large garrison placed in the fortress under the command of Eyndhouts (who died in action in the fort on November 30).

== Siege ==
The Dutch brought up reinforcements right away, but could not prevent the occupation by a Spanish army of 20,000 of the Duchy of Cleves during August and September. This army threatened an invasion of the Dutch heartland and it was therefore essential that this threat be countered. Frederick Henry personally started the siege of Schenkenschans within days of its fall, but soon transferred command to his cousin John Maurice, Prince of Nassau-Siegen. The besieging army had a strength at its peak of 30,000 men, while the size of the garrison was 1,500 men.

The terrain made the siege especially difficult. The fortress was built on an island between the two rivers that functioned as a moat. An escalade would therefore have been difficult, as the garrison was unlikely to let itself be surprised. Mining would have been impossible because of the water-logged terrain, and for the same reason the fortress could not be closely invested with entrenchments. However, the Dutch could and did use the terrain to protect the besieging army from Spanish efforts at relief by inundations. In any case, there seemed to be no option but to starve out the well-provisioned garrison and meanwhile to attempt to pound the fortress to rubble with siege artillery. This the Dutch did with alacrity. The fortress was bombarded from all sides, even by river gun-boats on the Waal.

The effects of such bombardments were terrible. According to an eye-witness, during one particular bombardment,

One could hear the screaming and crying in the sconce while the air was filled with smoke and flying debris for two hours on end.

Nevertheless, the garrison held out for nine months despite the terrible circumstances and the high casualties. When finally John Maurice negotiated an honorable surrender with the new governor of the fortress, Gomar de Fourdin, only 600 survivors walked out on 30 April 1636.

== Aftermath ==
The population of the Dutch Republic, reeling from the recent defeats, was elated by the surrender, whereas the Spanish chief minister Olivares fell victim to despondency at the loss of such a promising gain. He wrote to the Cardinal-Infante:

...pues veo, Señor, que se ha perdido la mayor joya que el rey nuestro Señor tenia en esos estados para poder acomodar sus cosas con gloria ... grande golpe, Señor, para el rey nuestro Señor, grande para toda España .

Though there may not have been a direct link with the loss of Schenkenschans for Spain, the Cardinal-Infante decided to change the focus of the Spanish offensive to France in the summer of 1636. To everybody's surprise this led to a collapse of French defenses and to a deep incursion into France, as far as Corbie.

The fortress of Schenkenschans once more played an important role in Dutch history thirty six years later when it fell to the invading French without a shot being fired during the Rampjaar on 21 June 1672 in the Franco-Dutch War. The governor of the fortress at the time was the 22-year-old son of a Nijmegen regent by the name of Ten Hoven or Ten Haef, who evidently was in over his head and surrendered the fortress in exchange for a chance to march the garrison off to Friesland By that time the rivers near the fortress had become so shallow that the French army could easily ford them. The fall of the fortress made the subsequent French invasion of the Republic much easier.

== Sources ==
- Israel, J.I. (1997), "Olivares, the Cardinal-Infante and Spain's Strategy in the Low Countries: The Road to Rocroi, 1635–43," in: Conflicts of Empires. Spain, the Low Countries and the struggle for world supremacy 1585–1713. Hambledon Press, ISBN 1-85285-161-9, pp. 63–91
