= Siege of San Andreas (1600) =

1600 action during the Eighty Years' and Anglo–Spanish wars

- Part of the Eighty Years' War and Anglo–Spanish War
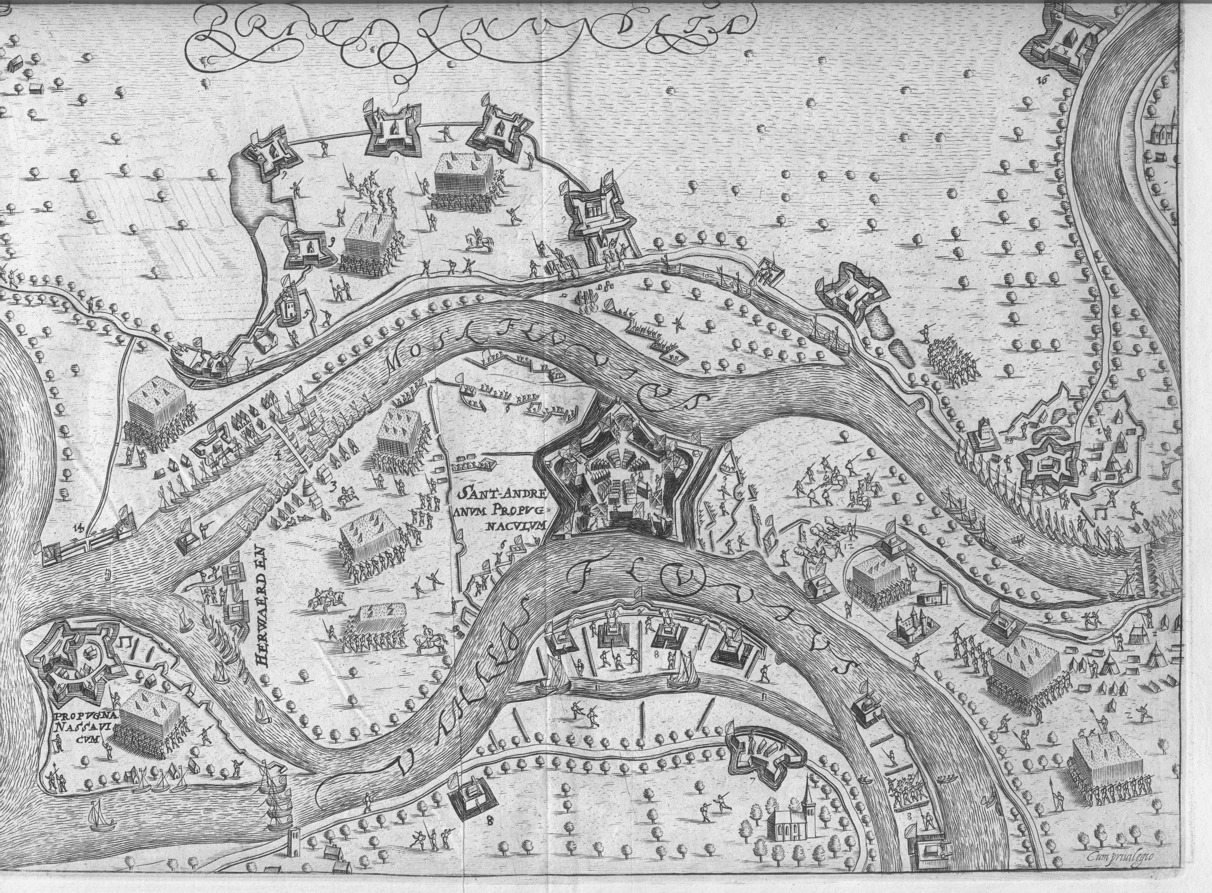
- Siege of San Andres 1600
Date	28 January to 6 March 1600
Location	near Heerewaarden (present-day the Netherlands) 51°48′07″N 5°21′57″E
Result	Dutch and English victory

Belligerents
Dutch Republic; England	Spain

Commanders and leaders
(Dutch Republic) Maurice of Orange (England) Francis Vere	(Spain) Francisco de Mendoza (Spain) Luis de Velasco

Strength
5,000	Fort: 1,200; Relief force: 4,000

Casualties and losses
Unknown	All surrendered
- Location within Netherlands Siege of San Andreas (1600) (North Sea)

The siege of San Andreas also known as the siege of Sint-Andries was a military event that took place during the Eighty Years' War and the Anglo–Spanish War from 28 January to 6 March 1600. The Spanish garrison of San Andreas was besieged by an Anglo-Dutch force led by Maurice of Nassau. A Spanish relief force under the command of Luis de Velasco failed to relieve the fort after having been turned back by the besiegers. The fort surrendered after the garrison mutinied and accepted payment from Maurice.

== Background ==
In April 1599 the Spanish Army of Flanders under the command of Francisco de Mendonza was ordered by the Archduke of Austria to mount an offensive into the Bommelerwaard. To bolster the Spanish attack, they built the forts of Crevecoeur just north of 's-Hertogenbosch and Fort San Andreas near Heerewaarden which could keep the Meuse (Dutch: Maas) and Waal rivers under their close surveillance. Soon after the Spanish besieged Zaltbommel but Maurice of Nassau’s Anglo-Dutch army managed to defend the town, then outmanoeuvred the Spanish forces which forced Mendoza to retreat. As a result of this severe defeat the Spanish army went into turmoil due to mutinies and all further offensive actions by the Army of Flanders were put on hold.

Maurice took advantage of the wide spread insurrection - first he retook Wachtendonk and then moved to Fort Voorne. From there he launched a campaign in the surrounding area to retake the only remnants of Spanish forces in the area, at forts Crevecoeur and San Andreas. The Anglo-Dutch laid siege to fort Crevecoeur which was captured with little difficulty after Maurice offered them money on the account of the garrisons mutiny. Soon after he marched towards Fort San Andreas of which the garrison consisted of 1,200 men, many who had mutinied against their officers but regarded the fort as their only pledge for the payment of their arrears.

== Siege ==
Maurice laid siege to the fort in late January 1600 and set up a tight blockade on land as well as the nearby rivers. The garrison of San Andreas however refused all negotiations which Maurice used to induce those at Crevecoeur to surrender. The garrison opposed the Anglo-Dutch in a vigorous and spirited defence for nearly six weeks whilst the besiegers fortified themselves around the dykes which they used to submerge the whole of the surrounding country.

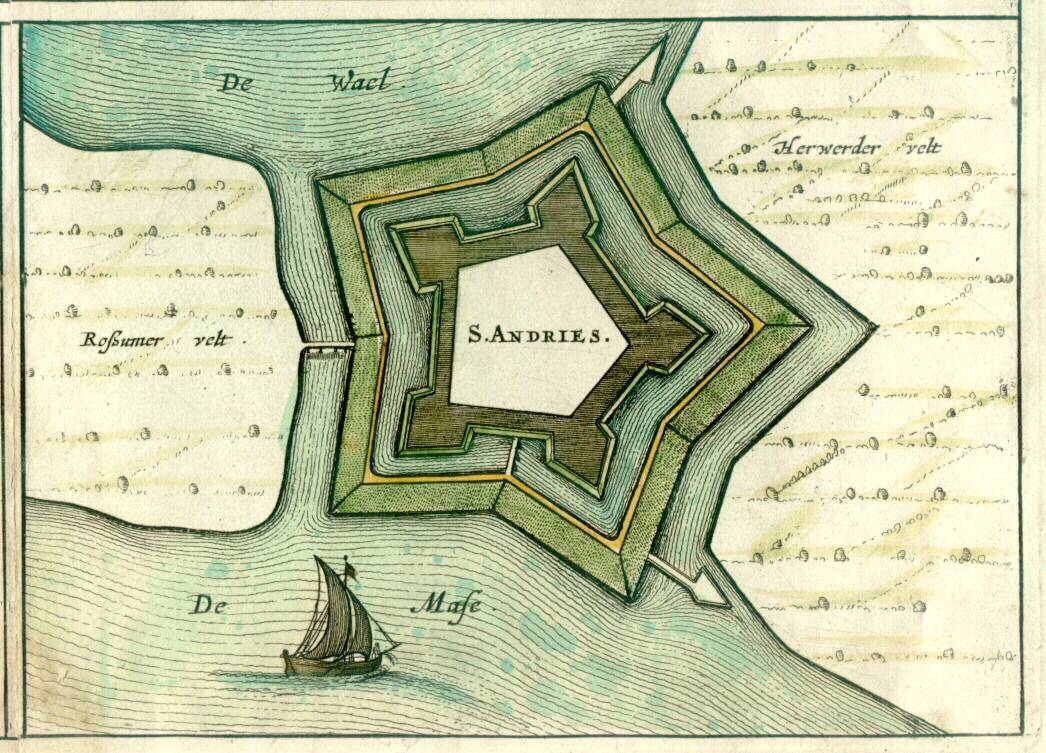
A map of the fort by Joan Blaeu

Mendoza considered the place of vital importance both on account of the strength of the fortifications and the great advantage which it afforded him for invading the Dutch Republic. He was therefore extremely eager to preserve it and for this purpose he assembled a force together at 's-Hertogenbosch. Nearly 4,000 men were thus put in place and in Mendoza's opinion this number was deemed sufficient to raise the siege. Of these troops Mendoza gave the command to Luis de Velasco who had overseen the construction of Fort San Andreas. Dutch strategy then classed the Spanish fort as the 'key to Holland'.

Velasco having heard of the siege wasted no time and set out from 's-Hertogenbosch. His attempts however at marching to the forts relief were rendered ineffectual because of the fortification of the Anglo-Dutch camp. In addition all the approaches to it were under water from the dykes from the Maas to all the low grounds of 's-Hertogenbosch. A small portion of his force managed to get through but were blocked by the besiegers and a column was ambushed. On hearing of these reports and seeing the difficulties, Velasco thus retreated.

The Spanish garrison were soon reduced to a state of extreme sickness and hunger and with the relief from Velasco not forthcoming many of the soldiers began to mutiny. Hearing of this Maurice made the offer of a payment of 125,000 guilders (£22,500) for the forts along with all of the ordnance and munitions. The Spanish officers refused but the German and Walloon soldiers thought otherwise - they disarmed the officers, took over the garrison, and accepted the offer.

== Aftermath ==
The fort of San Andreas was thus delivered into the hands of the Anglo-Dutch and thus the last Spanish stronghold in the Seven Provinces had fallen.

The Spanish officers already captured by the mutineers were taken prisoner but released soon after under parole. The vast majority of the Spanish garrison entered into the service of the States; they were formed into a separate regiment to which the soldiers gave them the name New Beggars because of their ragged appearance they made coming out of the fort. They were placed under the command of the young Prince Frederic Henry.

News of the fall of San Andreas was received in Brussels soon after and a potential peace with the Dutch Republic was then broken off. Archduke Albert vented his frustration to the Duke of Lerma and was eager to wage war.

With their capture of Fort San Andreas and with their frontiers free from danger, the Dutch Republic then resolved upon an offensive war in Catholic Flanders the following year. As a result Archduke Albert blockaded Ostend in a four year bloody siege.
