= Schenkenschanz =

Community in North Rhine-Westphalia, Germany

Coordinates: 51.8361°N 6.1103°E

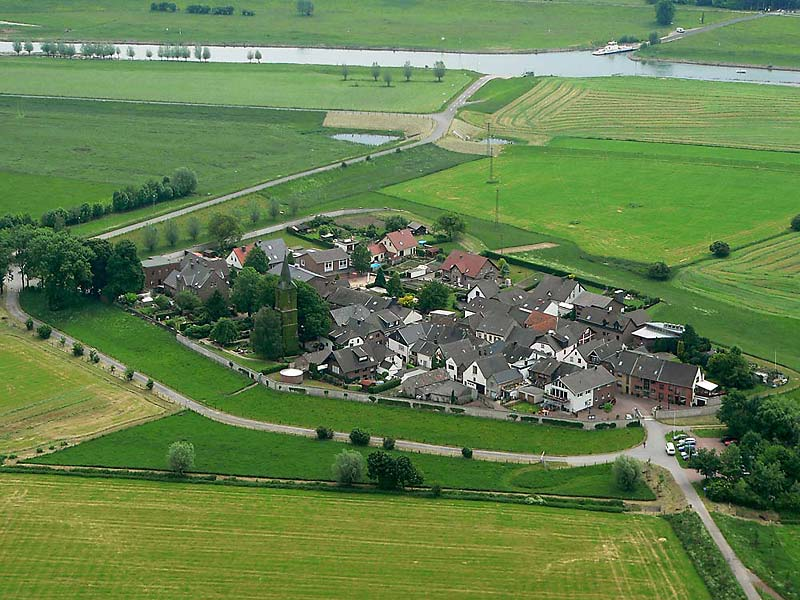
Schenkenschanz (2008), its ferry in the background

Schenkenschanz is a small community in North Rhine-Westphalia, Germany that was incorporated into the town of Kleve (Cleves) in 1969. Schenkenschanz is site of the former Schenkenschans fortress that was of significance in the Dutch Revolt.

== Today ==
Schenkenschanz is a village within Kleve and home to about 100 inhabitants (2013). Most of its 38 hectares is not protected against flooding and part of a nature preserve. Schenkenschanz is located about 5 km north of the center of Kleve. Until 1972 it could only be reached by ferry service across the nearby old Rhine arm, while today the Kleve-Griethausen bridge provides a road connection.

The area of Schenkenschanz is subject to the influence of the Rhine river due to flooding, erosion, formation of islands and changes in the course of the river. Schenkenschanz had military significance when it was the point that split the Rhine river into two arms, the southern Waal and the northern Nederrijn.

Flooding by the Rhine in 1995 forced a complete evacuation of the village.

== Schenkenschanz/Schenkenschans fortress ==
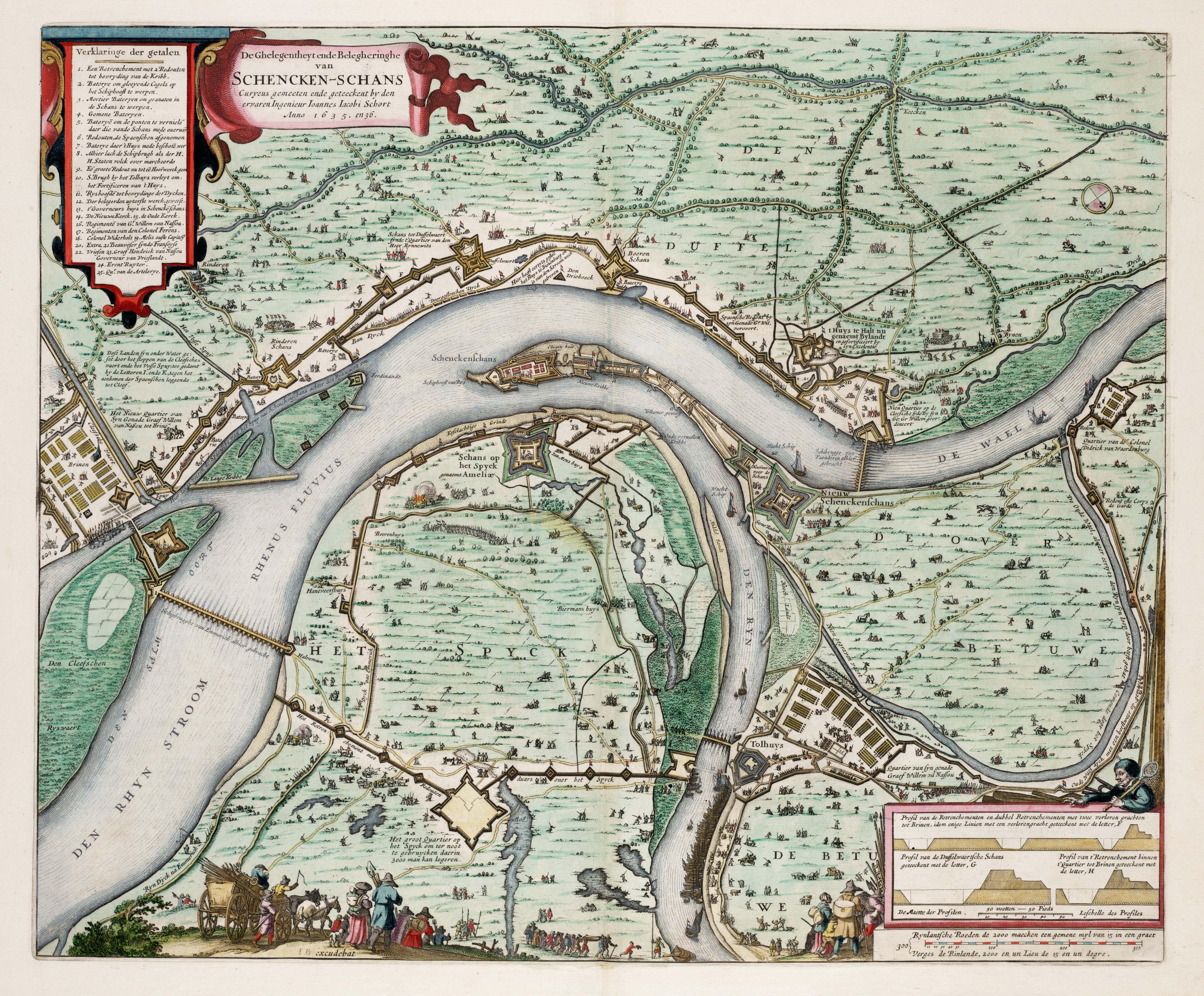
Schenkenschans fortress in 1635/36, by Jacobus Schort; North is at the bottom, so the Rhine flows from left to right

After the Dutch Republic had declared its independence from Spain in 1581, Robert Dudley, 1st Earl of Leicester commissioned Maarten Schenck van Nydeggen to erect a fortress at the Waal/Nederrijn fork in 1586. As Schenkenschans (Schenk's fortification) it was built as star fortress with extensive fortification works on both sides of the river representing at its time one of the strongest fortifications in Europe. It controlled the river access to the Netherlands.

During the Dutch War of Independence the fortress was unsuccessfully besieged in 1599 by Spanish forces. It was however captured by them in 1635 only to succumb to the Dutch forces led by Frederick Henry, Prince of Orange in the long and bitter siege of 1636.

During the Franco-Dutch War French troops under Louis XIV attacked the fortress successfully in 1672. Two years later Brandenburg-Prussian troops took over, dismantled the fortress and returned the place to the Dutch in 1679.

By the end of the 17th century Rhine water flowed more and more into the Waal while the Nederrijn at Schenkenschanz was silting up. The creation of the Pannerdens Kanaal in 1701/09 repositioned the fork between the two rivers west to Millingen aan de Rijn and Schenkenschanz lost its military significance.

About 1800 Schenkenschanz became French again. After the turmoil of the Napoleonic wars, Schenkenschanz become part of the Rhine Province, Prussia at the 1816 Congress of Vienna.
