= Sancho Folch de Cardona, 1st Marquess of Guadalest =

Sancho Folch de Cardona y Ruíz de Liori, ?th Lord and 1st Marquess of Guadalest, was the heir and son of Alfonso Folch de Cardona y Fajardo, ?th Lord of Guadalest, and wife Isabel Ruíz de Liori, Lady of Gorga. He was a member of the House of the Viscounts of Cardona and was elevated to 1st Marquess of his Feudal Lordship.

He married María Colón de Toledo (c. 1510 –), daughter of Diego Colón and wife María de Toledo y Rojas, and had:

- Cristóbal Colón de Cardona, 2nd Marquess of Guadalest (– 1583), unmarried and without issue
- María Colón de Cardona, 3rd Marchioness of Guadalest (c. 1540 – 1591), married to Francisco de Mendoza, without surviving issue.
