= Vorn =

Vorn is a surname. Notable people with the surname include:

- Bill Vorn (born 1959), Canadian artist, musician, and professor
- Vorn Vet (1929–1978), Cambodian politician

== See also ==
- Corn (surname)
- Vonn
- Voorn
