= Vonn =

Vonn is a surname. Notable people with the surname include:

- Eric Vonn, Guatemalan screenwriter
- Lindsey Vonn (born 1984), American alpine skier
- Thomas Vonn (born 1975), American alpine skier, ex-husband of Lindsey Vonn

== See also ==
- Von (disambiguation)
- Vorn
