= Voorn =

Voorn is a Dutch surname. Notable people with the surname include:

- Albert Voorn (born 1956), Dutch equestrian
- Dick Voorn (born 1948), Dutch football manager
- Jessey Voorn (born 1990), Dutch basketball player
- Joop Voorn (1932–2021), Dutch composer
- Joris Voorn (born 1977), Dutch DJ
- Orlando Voorn, Dutch DJ
- Vincent Voorn (born 1984), Dutch show jumper

== See also ==
- Vorn
