= Francisco de Mendoza =

Spanish nobleman and diplomat

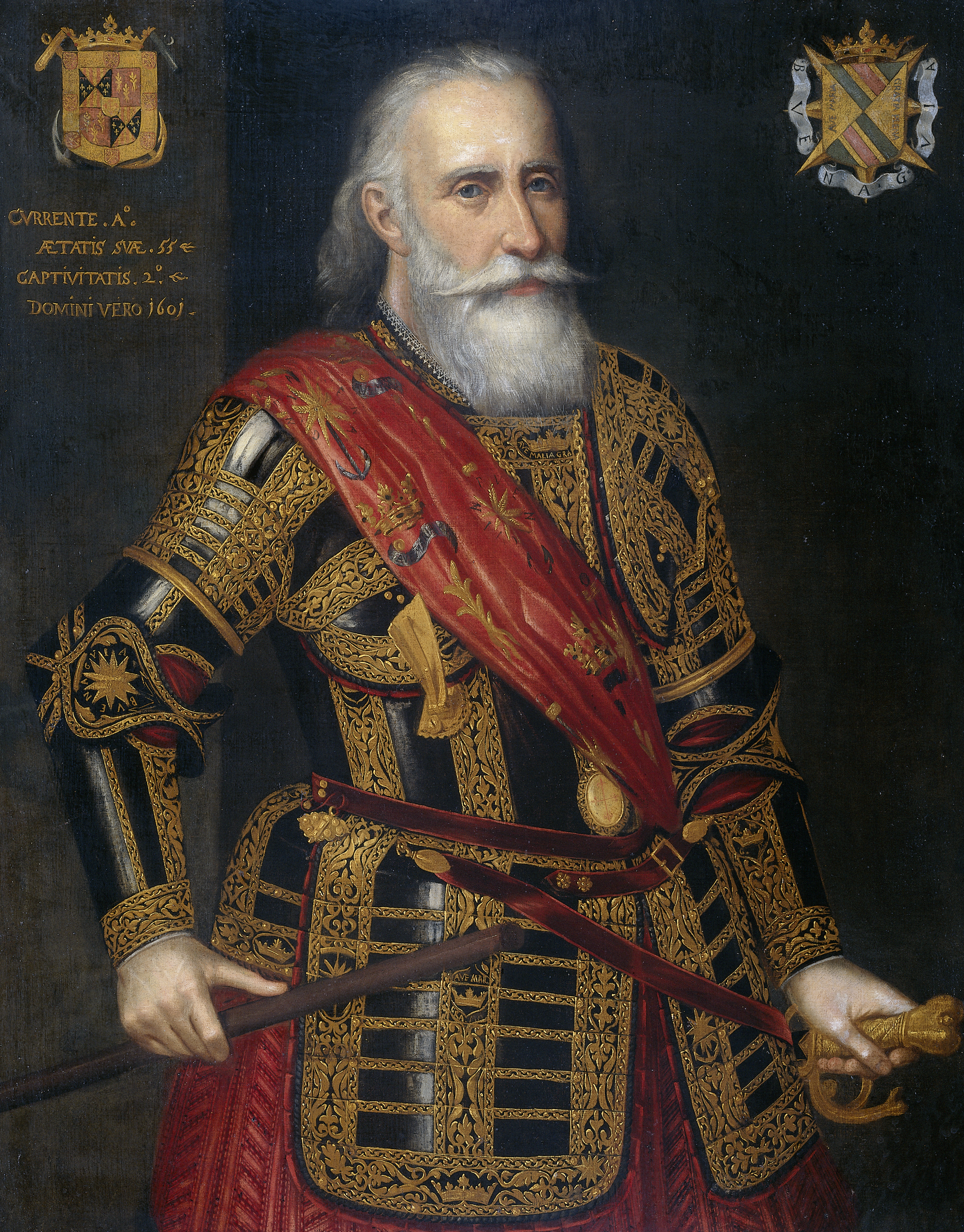
Portrait of Francisco de Mendoza by a painter of the school of Daniël van den Queborn

Francisco López de Mendoza y Mendoza (Granada, 1547 – Madrid, 1 March 1623), in the literature often simply referred to as Francisco de Mendoza, was a Spanish nobleman, diplomat, general, and eventually bishop, who briefly played an important role in the Eighty Years' War.

== Life ==
=== Youth ===
Mendoza was the third son (Note: Hence, under the rules of primogeniture he could not inherit his father's titles and was relegated to the status of a "segundo" (literally "second man") in the aristocratic pecking order of Spain, though his father was a grandee.) of Iñigo López de Mendoza y Mendoza, 3rd Marquess of Mondéjar, and María de Mendoza y Aragón, daughter of Íñigo López de Mendoza, 4th Duke of the Infantado. At the time of his birth his father was Captain general of the viceroyalty of Granada in the old kingdom of Andalusia, that had been only recently (1492) definitively conquered. He was also Alcalde of the Alhambra, the presumptive birthplace of Francisco. Around the age of fifteen Francisco started his studies in the Classics at the University of Alcalá and in philosophy at the University of Salamanca. These studies were interrupted when he joined his father during the latter's embassy to the Holy See in 1560–1562. In 1568 he again joined his father when the latter was entrusted with the suppression of the Rebellion of the Alpujarras (1568–71), as a captain. He was awarded the encomienda (landed estate) of Valdepeñas, one of the commanderies of the Order of Calatrava, of which he had been a knight (Note: The knights of the military order of Calatrava had been sworn to celibacy until 1540. This austerity may partly explain why Mendoza apparently made no attempt to get married until after his father's death in 1580.) since age 12, in recognition of his service. Mendoza continued working for his father in administrative positions during his father's appointments as Viceroy of first Valencia (1572-1575) and later of Naples (1575-1579)

In March 1584 Mendoza married by proxy (represented by Juan de Zuñiga) María Ruiz de Liori Colón and Cardona, the daughter of Sancho Folch de Cardona, 1st Marquess of Guadalest. Cardona did not have a male heir, (Note: His son Cristóbal Colón de Cardona, 2nd Marquess of Guadalest, had died in 1583.) so he made one of the provisions of the marriage contract that Mendoza would adopt his wife's surname Cardona, and crest, during the marriage. When Cardona soon after died, Maria inherited the title, and Mendoza became Marquess of Guadelest de jure uxoris. Cardona had also been Almirante de Aragón, which title his daughter (and hence Mendoza) also inherited. For that reason Mendoza was henceforth known as the "Admiral of Aragon", though he never held a naval command. The marriage also brought a long list of lawsuits with it, as Maria had been previously briefly married to Juan Felipe Fernández de Heredia, Count of Fuentes, and from this followed conflicts with the family Colón (relatives of Christopher Columbus) about the unpaid dowry and several disputed aristocratic titles. The lawsuits were very expensive and took a very long time. Mendoza felt therefore constrained to engage the Toledo attorney Agustín Álvarez, and promised payment of a large sum on the contingency of success. When the lawsuit initially ended successfully in 1586 Mendoza was unable to pay, however. Álvarez took umbrage and switched sides, which resulted eventually in the loss of the lawsuit.

The marriage brought the birth of a daughter, Maria José de Cardona Mendoza, who unfortunately did not live long. The little girl died on 25 January 1590

In the same year Mendoza got into trouble with king Philip II of Spain. On behalf of his uncle the duke of Infantado he had negotiated a marriage contract for the latter's daughter Mencia de Mendoza with Antonio Álvarez de Toledo, 5th Duke of Alba. Unfortunately these negotiations took place without the consent of the king and the groom-to-be had already married Catalina Enriquez Riberea, the daughter of the duke of Alcalá. Though this previous marriage was annulled, the king was not amused and jailed the people implicated in the matter. Mendoza was incarcerated in the castle of Turégano on 31 July 1590. He was only released in August 1592, but meanwhile his wife had died in Calzada de Calatrava in August 1591, where she had moved after Mendoza had been transferred to the nearby monastery-fortress of Calatrava la Nueva.

After his release Mendoza entered in marriage negotiations for the hand of a daughter of the Count of Chinchón, Mencia de la Cerda. As the bride's brother Luis Jerónimo de Cabrera, 4th Count of Chinchón was a favorite of king Philip, this contributed to Mendoza's rehabilitation, even though the marriage eventually fell through because the lady lost interest.

=== In the Netherlands (1595 - 1603) ===
Mendoza received the post of mayordomo mayor (lord high steward) in the household of Albert VII, Archduke of Austria in 1595. When Albert was appointed as Governor General of the Spanish Netherlands, as successor of his elder brother Archduke Ernest of Austria in February 1595, Mendoza was charged with the organisation of the journey to Brussels. Though Mendoza was an adherent of the "Papalist" faction of the Spanish court (the successor of the "Albalists" of a previous generation), he was also a client of the count of Chinchón, the leader of the Castilian faction (previously known as the "Ebolists"). This may explain why his behavior in his new posting was somewhat ambivalent at times.

Soon after his arrival in the Netherlands, the death of his kinsman Rodrigo Silva, duke of Pastrana, who was master of the horse, gave Mendoza the opportunity of acquiring that office for himself. So from 1596 he became general of cavalry of the Army of Flanders. He also was involved in the negotiations of the Peace of Vervins, which ended the war with France. Another diplomatic mission of his went to Poland, where he tried to oppose the trade of that kingdom with the Dutch Republic and asked the Sejm to allow Spanish ships to use Baltic ports to prepare to attack England.

The peace with France freed the hands of the Army of Flanders in the ongoing war against the Dutch Republic. The government of Archduke Albert therefore decided on a new offensive against that adversary in the Fall of 1598. A complicating factor was that the Spanish mercenaries of the army had not been paid for a long time and therefore were in a mutinous mood. They had "lived off the land" in the Spanish Netherlands for some time, which made the regime very unpopular. During the absence of Archduke Albert in connection with his marriage to the Spanish Infanta Isabella Clara Eugenia, which would bring him the sovereignty over the Spanish Netherlands, he handed over the government of the Spanish Netherlands to Cardinal Andrew and Mendoza. Mendoza (as temporary commander-in-chief of the army in agreement with Cardinal Andrew) therefore decided to kill two birds with one stone and opened an offensive against the Dutch Republic from an oblique angle, by fording first the river Meuse at Venlo and later the river Rhine near Orsoy, Germany. Next he marched along the right bank of the Rhine toward the border of the Dutch Republic, taking in short succession the town of Alpen, Germany and the fortress of Broich in the Duchy of Berg. The garrison of the latter place was massacred and the count who lived there, murdered. Then, after the capture of Moers he retook the fortress town of Rheinberg which had in August 1597 been taken by Maurice, Prince of Orange, the Captain general of the Dutch States Army in the first Siege of Rheinberg. From there Mendoza divided his forces, sending one part to Doetinchem in Zutphen County, which was captured, and the other part to Rees, Germany, which also was captured. Then the Spanish army went into winter quarters, visiting severe privations on the neutral German countryside, giving the Germans a foretaste of what the Thirty Years' War was going to be like. This motivated the German princes of the Westphalian Kreis to start recruiting mercenaries to drive the Spaniards out in 1599.

Meanwhile, king Philip II had died and was succeeded by king Philip III of Spain. In the Spring of 1599 Cardinal Andrew took over the military reins from Mendoza (Archduke Albert still being absent), and ordered Mendoza to invade the Bommelerwaard and lay siege to Zaltbommel. This campaign ended in a fiasco. The only positive result was the construction of two Spanish fortresses, Crevecoeur and San Andreas. The latter was taken the next year by Maurice in the Siege of San Andreas (1600). The Army of Flanders was in this period paralyzed by mutinies and could only look on when Maurice undertook a full-scale invasion of the Spanish Netherlands in the Summer of 1600 on his way to invest Dunkirk, an important naval base for Spain at the time. Only when he had reached Nieuwpoort, Belgium Archduke Albert, who by now had taken personal command of the Army of Flanders, succeeded in arriving at an accommodation with the Spanish mutineers in Diest and persuading them to return to service. Albert then advanced on the States Army near Nieuwpoort, with Mendoza in charge of his cavalry. On 2 July 1600 the Battle of Nieuwpoort took place, in which the Spanish army was routed. Mendoza was taken prisoner by the Dutch. (Note: According to Mendoza himself (in a letter to Philip III of 7 October 1603) he had fought rather heroically and initially successfully. Only when the Archduke got into danger because of his risky behavior, and Mendoza was forced to go to his aid, the leaderless Spanish cavalry broke. He fought a heroic rearguard action with two hundred troopers, while the Archduke left the field. Other sources differ. Cf. Allen, p. 47, note 36)

Mendoza was held as a prisoner of war for two years, first in the fortress of Woerden and subsequently in the Binnenhof at The Hague (Note: He was held in a relatively comfortable apartment above the Audience Chamber of the Hof van Holland, where two decades later Johan van Oldenbarnevelt spent the last months of his life during the Trial of Oldenbarnevelt, Grotius and Hogerbeets.) He was eventually exchanged for a large number of Dutch prisoners of war and a large ransom in 1602 Immediately after his release Mendoza was employed by the Archduke to block a Dutch invasion toward Maastricht. Mendoza, at the head of a force that he considered too weak to engage Maurice in the field, retreated to Diest where he awaited reinforcements that Spinola had marched up from Italy. When these arrived Maurice retreated in the direction of Grave to which Spanish-held fortress he laid siege, while Mendoza left him unmolested till it was too late to lift the siege.

=== In Spain (1603 - 1623) ===
Then king Philip III recalled him to the court in Valladolid where he arrived in February 1603. Having lost the lawsuit about the succession to the Marquisate of Mondejar while he was a prisoner of war, Mendoza was in financial difficulties and forced to accept the charity of his brother Juan for the rest of his life. In 1606 he was arrested on the pretext of an altercation by one of his servants with a doorman of the count of Villalonga, a secretary of State (and favorite of the king), and locked up in Torrejón de Velasco, but he was released in January 1607.

A few years later he accused Rodrigo Calderón, Count of Oliva, an ally of the king's favorite, the duke of Lerma of corruption in the case of the nomination of one of Lerma's sons to the position of alcalde of the Alhambra, to which the family of Mendoza had ancient claims. This resulted again in Mendoza's arrest, this time on false accusations of treason. He was incarcerated in Santorcaz on 20 May 1609, but subsequently transferred to monasteries in Guadalajara, Castilla–La Mancha for his deteriorating health. He was released after five years imprisonment without ever having been convicted of anything.

Mendoza decided to take holy orders in 1617, at the age of 70. The new king Philip IV of Spain in recognition of the injustices he had been subjected to under the reign of the king's father, proposed the elevation of Mendoza to bishop of Sigüenza on 8 August 1622.

Mendoza died on 1 March 1623 in Madrid. He was first interred in a chapel in the college that the Society of Jesus maintained at the University of Alcalá (co-founded by his sister Catalina). In 1632 he was reburied before the high altar.
