= Heerewaarden =

- Village
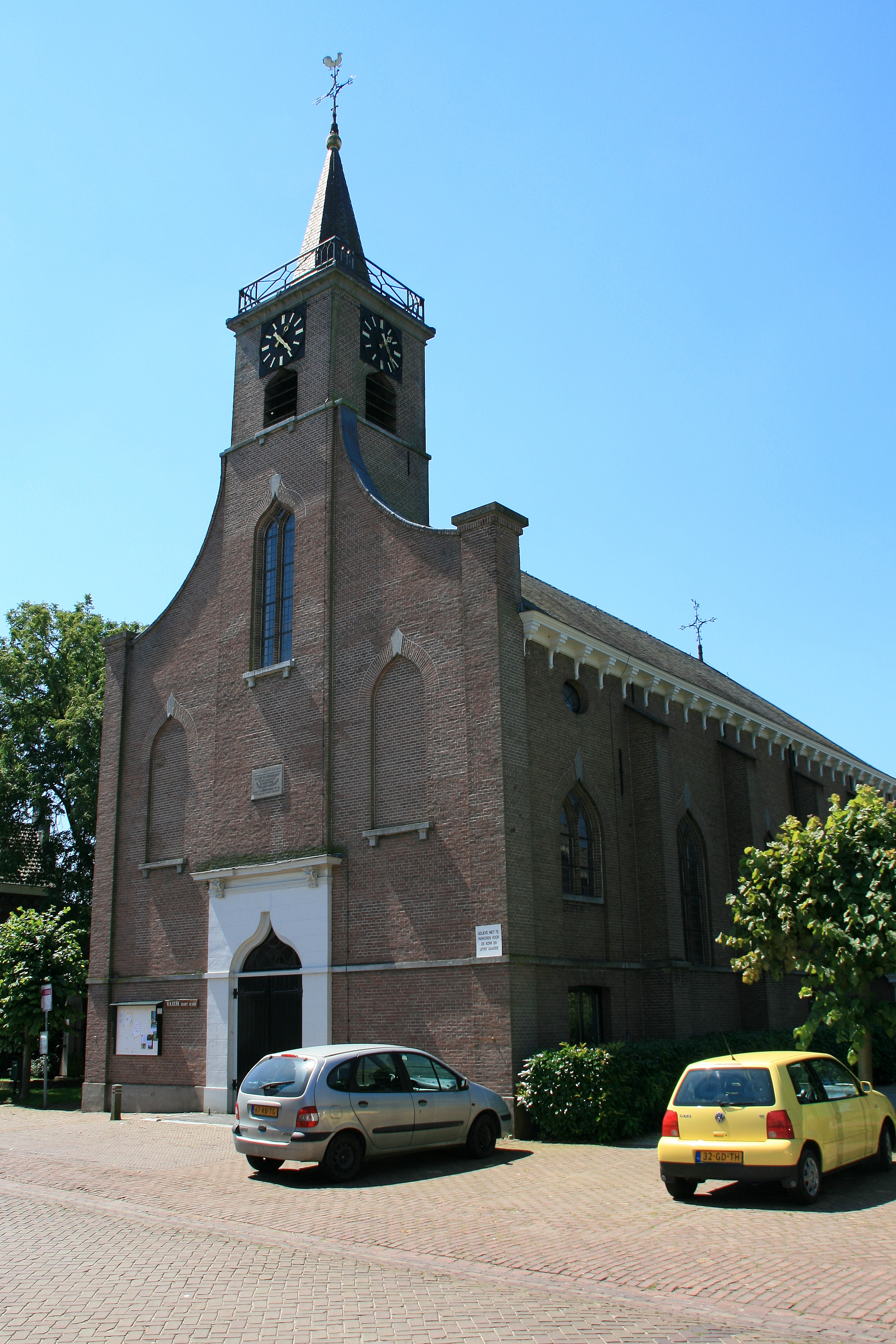
- Reformed church

- Flag Coat of arms

- Location in the Netherlands Heerewaarden (Netherlands)
- Coordinates: 51.8166°N 5.3906°E
- Country: Netherlands
- Province: Gelderland
- Municipality: Maasdriel

Area
  - Total: 5.92 km^{2} (2.29 sq mi)
- Elevation: 6 m (20 ft)

Population (2021)
  - Total: 1,185
  - Density: 200/km^{2} (518/sq mi)
- Time zone: UTC+1 (CET)
  - Summer (DST): UTC+2 (CEST)
- Postal code: 6624
- Dialing code: 0487

Heerewaarden is a village in the Dutch province of Gelderland. It is a part of the municipality of Maasdriel, and lies about 8 km south of Tiel.

Heerewaarden was a separate municipality until 1999, except for a short period between 1818 and 1821, when it was part of Rossum.

== History ==
It was first mentioned in 997 as "ad Heriuuarda". The etymology is unclear. In 997, the area was given to Notker of Liège, the Prince-Bishop of Liège who builds a monastery. The Dutch Reformed Church was completed in 1850 and replaced a church from 1608.

Fort De Voorn was a sconce built in 1588 by Maurice of Orange on the river island Voorne to control the river. The Spanish were unable to take the fort and constructed Fort St Andries near by. During the Dutch Revolt both forts kept on firing at each other. Fort Voorne was destroyed in 1673 by the French. Fort Nieuw St Andries was built in 1815 to replace the old fort. During World War II, it was used by the Luftwaffe. In 1945, it was blown up to prevent it from falling into allied hands. In 1840, Heerewaarde was home to 511 people.

== Gallery ==
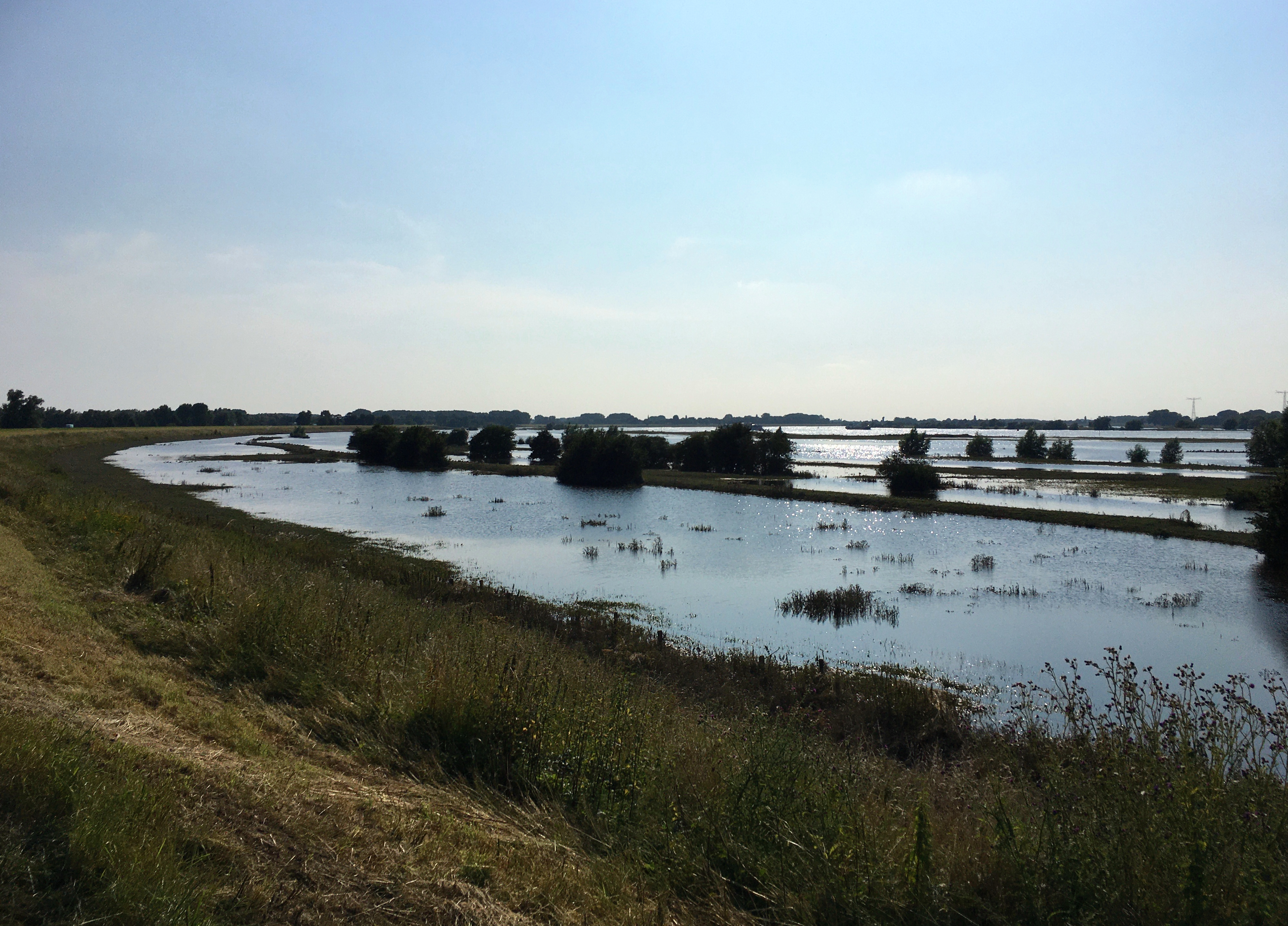
High water in Heerewaarden

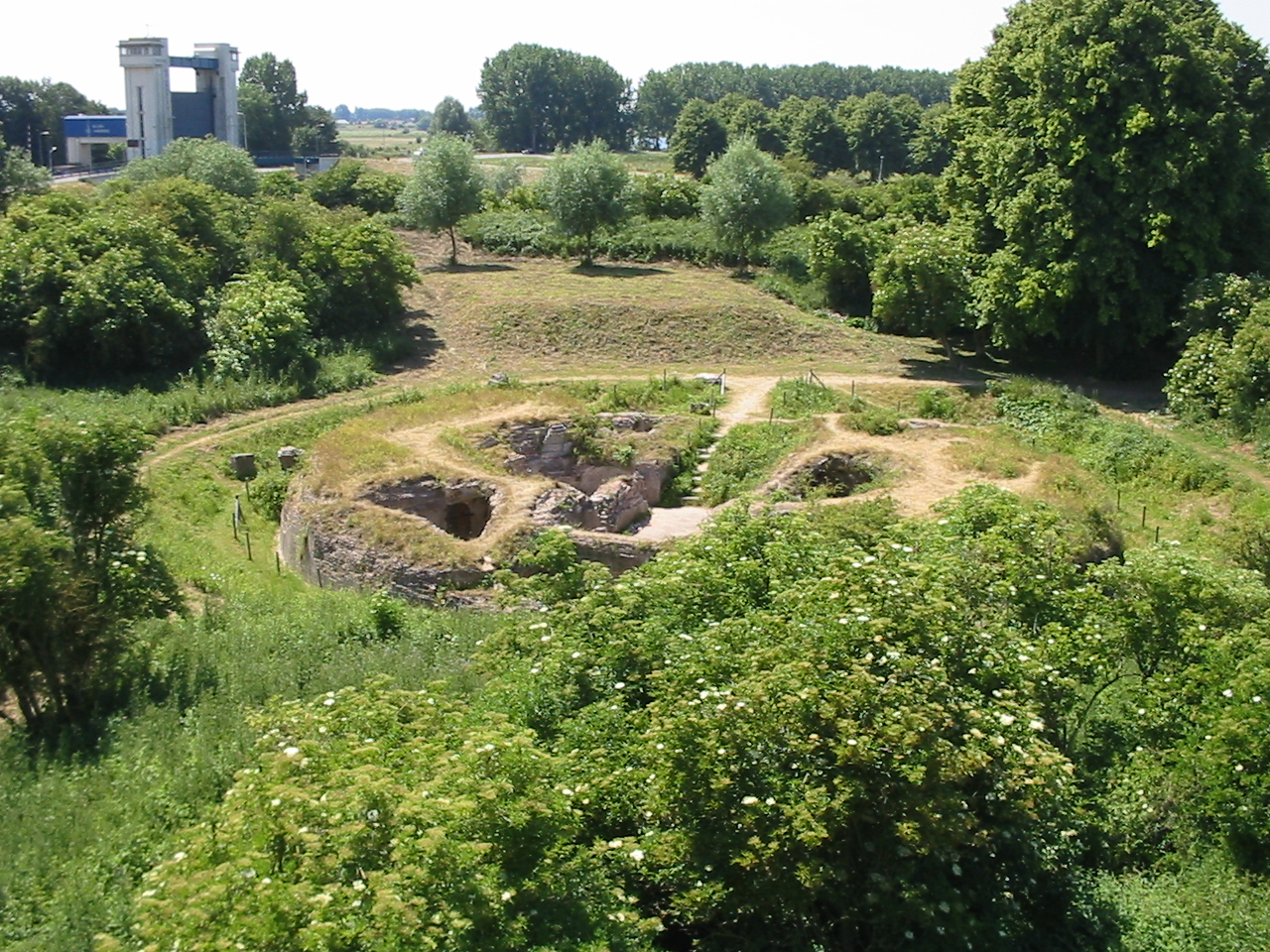
Remains of Nieuw Fort St. Andries
