= Bommelerwaard =

District in Gelderland, Netherlands

Coordinates: 51°46′32″N 5°11′57″E

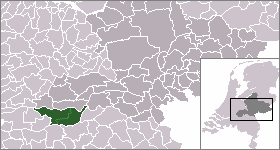

Bommelerwaard is a district in Gelderland, Netherlands.

The Bommelerwaard is situated among three rivers: the Meuse (Dutch: Maas) in the south(east), the Waal in the north and the Afgedamde Maas in the west. It is formed by the area of two municipalities: Zaltbommel and Maasdriel.
