= Melun (disambiguation) =

Melun is a commune in France.

Melun may also refer to:

== People ==
- Anne de Melun (1619–1679), widely known as Mademoiselle de Melun, a noblewoman from the Spanish Netherlands who founded and ran a hospital for the poor in rural France
- Anne Julie de Melun (1698–1724), French noblewoman and mother of the general Charles de Rohan and Madame de Marsan, governess of Louis XVI
- Guillaume de Melun (1588–1635), a nobleman in the Spanish Netherlands, Governor and Grand Bailiff of the County of Hainaut, and Constable of Flanders
- Guillaume IV de Melun (died 1415), Count of Tancarville, Lord of Montreuil-Bellay, French politician, chamberlain and advisor to King Charles VI of France
- Judah of Melun, 13th century Jewish rabbi
- Louis, Duke of Joyeuse (1694–1724) (Louis de Melun), French nobleman
- Pierre de Melun (died 1594), Prince of Espinoy, Marquis of Richebourg, Baron of Antoing, etc., a nobleman in the Low Countries who sided with the Dutch against King Philip II of Spain
- Robert de Melun (died 1585), Viscount of Ghent and Marquis of Roubaix who fought in the Eighty Years' War
- Robert of Melun (c. 1100–1167), English theologian and Bishop of Hereford
- Simon de Melun (1250–1302), Marshal of France

== Other uses ==
- Arrondissement of Melun, containing the commune
- Canton of Melun, an administrative division in the arrondissement of Melun
- FC Melun, a football club located in Melun, France
- Melun station, Melun, France

== See also ==
- Melun Diptych, by the 15th-century French painter Jean Fouquet
- Treaty of Melun, April 1226, between Louis VIII of France and Jeanne of Constantinople
- Melun Act of 1851, one of the first laws regarding public health
