= Guillaume Le Vasseur =

Guillaume Le Vasseur (died 1590), lord of Valhuon, was a nobleman of Artois who served Philip II of Spain as a soldier and diplomat during the Dutch Revolt.

Le Vasseur sat in the States of the County of Artois as a representative of the Noble Estate and served in the bande d'ordonnance commanded by the Count of Roeulx. He went on to serve in the royal administration of the county. In 1578 he was placed under house arrest by the rebels then in the ascendancy in Arras. He fled to Namur, where he joined the entourage of Don John of Austria. Don John's successor as governor general, Alexander Farnese, Duke of Parma, delegated Le Vasseur, together with Mathieu Moulart, to negotiate the reconciliation of the Union of Arras to the Crown. Le Vasseur and Moulart were later joined by Jean de Noircarmes, who had been accredited as a representative of the king in negotiations with the Estates General. The three of them together signed the Treaty of Arras (1579) on behalf of the Crown.

Le Vasseur was knighted by letters patent of 7 January 1589 and died shortly after making his will in October 1590. He had two children, François and Eleonore, with his first wife, Anne Quarré, and a third, Floris, with his second wife.
