= Robert de Melun =

- Viscount of Ghent; Knight of the Golden Fleece
- Born: Middle of the 16th century
- Died: 4 April 1585
- Spouse: Anne de Rollin
- Issue: None
- Father: Hugues d'Epinoy
- Mother: Yoldande de Warchin

Robert de Melun (died 1585), viscount of Ghent and marquis of Roubaix, was a nobleman from the Low Countries who fought in the Eighty Years' War.

== Life ==
Melun was the son of Hugues d'Epinoy and Yoldande de Warchin, lady of Roubaix, and was probably born towards the middle of the 16th century. In May 1574 Philip II of Spain appointed him commander of a bande d'ordonnance, but he was disqualified from receiving his commission after killing Philip of Mansfeld in a quarrel at court on 28 May. Mathieu Moulart, abbot of Saint-Ghislain, mediated a reconciliation between Melun and his victim's father, Peter Ernst I von Mansfeld-Vorderort.

As a leading member of the nobility, Melun was a signatory of the Pacification of Ghent and the Union of Brussels. He was appointed Governor of the County of Artois in October 1576, and on 11 September 1577 general of cavalry in the forces of the States General, trying to hold a middle position in the Dutch Revolt between the rebels of Holland and Zeeland, led by William the Silent, and the royal government headed by governor general Don John of Austria. Melun fought against royal forces in the Battle of Gembloux (1578). His views on the state of affairs gradually became more royalist, in part under the influence of Mathieu Moulart, who had become bishop of Arras in 1577. In 1578 Melun pressed the States General to reconcile with the king, and in 1579 he was among the signatories of the Treaty of Arras, by which Artois recognised the sovereignty of Philip II. He went on to serve as an officer under Peter Ernst von Mansfeld. On 10 May 1580 Melun accepted the surrender of François de la Noue, a Huguenot commander who had become a mercenary in Dutch service, and delivered him to the Prince of Parma in Mons with great shows of civility and regard. He took part in the Siege of Bouchain (1580) and the Siege of Tournai (1581), the latter defended by his sister-in-law, Marie-Christine de Lalaing, who was married to Pierre de Melun.

Robert de Melun was endowed with the lands confiscated from his brother, Pierre, who continued to support the revolt. He was also made Marquis of Roubaix, held a commission as a cavalry commander in the Army of Flanders, and was named a knight of the Golden Fleece. He died on 4 April 1585, from wounds sustained during the Siege of Antwerp, before being invested as a knight of the Fleece. He and his wife, Anne de Rollin, had been childless.
