= Charles Alexandre de Croÿ, Marquis of Havré =

Charles Alexandre de Croÿ
- Marquis of Havré
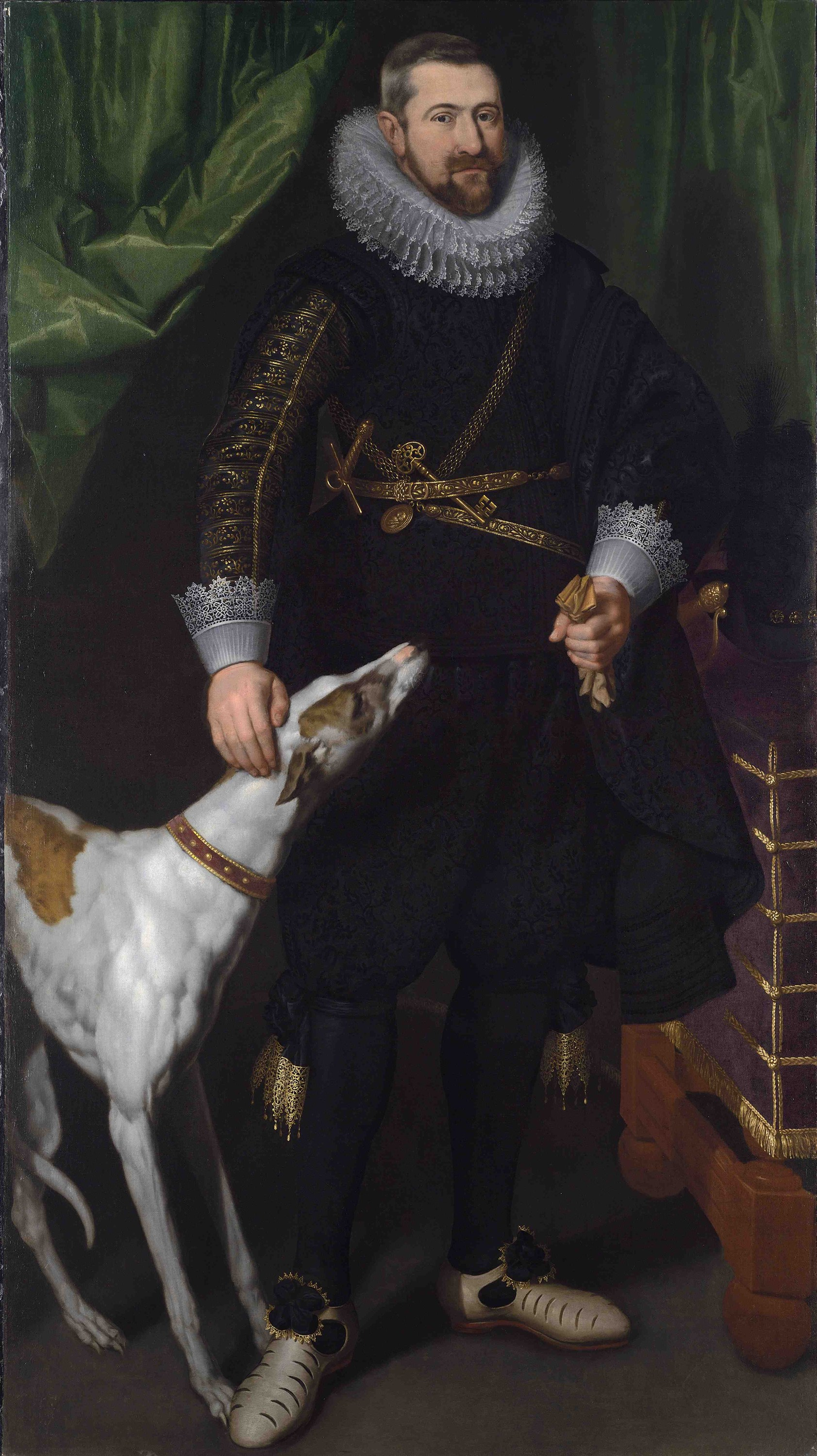
- Portrait by an anonymous artist of the Flemish School
- Other titles: Count of Fontenoy
- Born: 1574
- Died: 1624 (aged 49–50); Brussels
- Buried: Chapel Church, Brussels
- Noble family: House of Croÿ
- Married: (1) Yolande de Ligne (1585–1611) (2) Geneviève d'Urfé (1597–1656)
- Issue: Marie-Claire de Croÿ (1605–1664)
- Father: Charles Philippe de Croÿ, Marquis d’Havré (1549–1613)
- Mother: Diane de Dammartin, Countess of Fontenoy (1552–1625)
- Occupation: soldier
Charles Alexandre de Croÿ, Marquis of Havré
- Military career
- Allegiance: Spanish Habsburg
- Branch: Army of Flanders
- Service years: 1597–1624
- Rank: cavalry commander
- Unit: Bandes d'ordonnance
- Conflicts: Siege of Amiens (1597); Siege of Ostend (1601); Siege of Oldenzaal (1605); Battle of White Mountain (1620)
- Awards: Knight of the Golden Fleece (1617)
- Other work: Memoires geurriers (Antwerp, 1642)

Charles Alexandre de Croÿ (1574–1624), Marquis of Havré, Count of Fontenoy, Knight of the Golden Fleece, was a military commander and memoirist from the Habsburg Netherlands and a murder victim.

== Life ==
Charles Alexander was born in 1574, the son of Charles Philippe de Croÿ, Marquis d’Havré (1549–1613) and Diane de Dommartin, Countess of Fontenoy (1552–1625).

Pursuing a military career, he served in a relief column during the Siege of Amiens (1597). The following year he accompanied Archduke Albert on his journey to Spain to marry the Infanta Isabella, as a gentleman of the court.

In 1601 he became captain of an elite cavalry company serving in the Siege of Ostend, and in 1602 commandant of the fifteen Bandes d'ordonnance. He spent eleven months as a hostage of the mutineers during the Mutiny of Hoogstraten, during which time he started to write his memoirs, which were eventually published posthumously in 1642.

On 27 May 1605 he was appointed to the Archduke's Council of War. In 1606 he represented the Archduke at the wedding of the Duke of Lorraine's son and heir, Henry of Bar, and Margherita Gonzaga.

In 1617 he was invested as a knight of the Golden Fleece, on the occasion of his second marriage, to Geneviève d'Urfé.

At the outbreak of the Thirty Years' War he was seconded to the imperial army and served in the Battle of White Mountain, but in 1624 he retired from military service to take up a position in civilian administration. On the evening of 9 November 1624 he was shot through a window of his house in Brussels, dying of his injuries the following day, after receiving medical and spiritual aid in his final hours.

== Writings ==
- Memoires geurriers de ce qu'y c'est passé aux Pays Bas, depuis le commencement de l'an 1600 iusques a la fin de l'année 1606 (Antwerp, Hieronymus Verdussen, 1642), Available on Google Books.
