= Klara Izabella Pacowa =

Polish court official

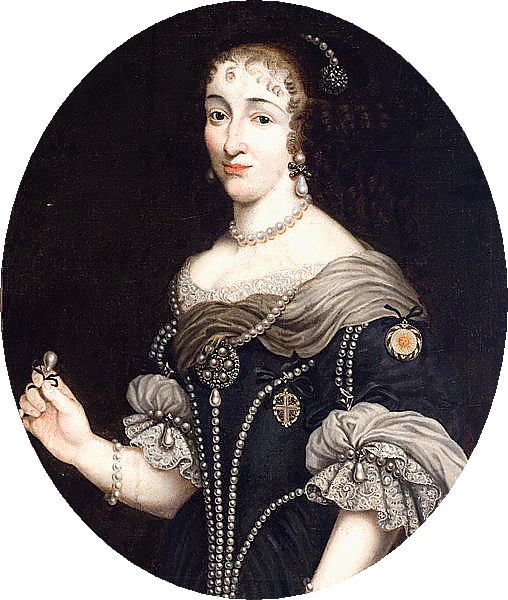
Portrait by Daniel Schultz

Klara Izabella Pacowa, born Claire Isabelle Eugenie de Mailly-Lespine (1631 - 11 March 1685), was a Polish court official. She was a lady-in-waiting and confidante of two of the queens of Poland, Marie Louise Gonzaga and Eleanor of Austria, Queen of Poland, and came to play an important part in Polish political life.

== Early life ==
She was the daughter of the French count Antoine de Mailly-Lespine and Geneviève d'Urfé, widow of Prince Charles Alexandre de Croÿ-Havré.

=== Lady-in-waiting to Marie-Louise ===
As a poor distant relation to Marie Louise Gonzaga, she arrived in Poland as a maid-of-honour in service to the queen. She served as maid-of-honour to the queen from 1646 to 1654. She attracted attention by her beauty in the court ballet The Four Seasons, and was named as one of the nymphs of the queen's court in the poem "Psyche" by Jan Andrzej Morsztyn. The politically active queen Marie Louise used her ladies-in-waiting to form connections and alliances which could be of use to her in state affairs, and on 28 June 1654 she arranged for Klara Izabella to marry Krzysztof Zygmunt Pac.

After marriage, she continued as a close companion to the queen. During the Deluge, Klara Izabella accompanied the queen to Silesia and then the royal court around Poland during the war with Sweden, being present with the queen in Gdansk in January 1657, and Silesia in April; she returned to Warsaw in 1659. As most ladies-in-waiting of the politically active queen, Klara Izabella followed the queen's example and engaged actively in state affairs. She is believed to have persuaded her spouse to support the French candidate in the following election of 1661, and she herself raised a sum of 3000 livres to benefit French interests during the election. Being the lady-in-waiting to the queen and constantly present at court, she formed valuable connections, protected the interests of her spouse and promoted him in the eyes of the royal couple and mediated any conflicts between them. She maintained connections with foreign rulers through their diplomats, whom she received as guests in the Belvedere Palace her husband had built for her as her residence in Warszaw in 1663. During the 1660s, French diplomat Pierre de Bonzy referred to her and Maria Kazimiera Sobieska, her rival as favorite, as the two most important and influential women at the Polish court after the queen.

=== Lady-in-waiting to Eleanor ===
During the reign of King Michał Korybut Wiśniowiecki, she and her husband were the leaders of the Pro-French Pac-Party and suggested a marriage between the king and the French candidate for the position of queen consort in alliance with the French envoy Hugo de Lionne. When this ended in failure in 1669, they made an alliance with Austria instead, and she was appointed lady-in-waiting to the king's new queen, Eleanor of Austria. Klara Izabella Pacowa swiftly managed to gain the confidence of queen Eleanor, as she helped the newly arrived queen acclimate to Poland and navigate the political system, and in return became her most influential lady-in-waiting.

=== Reign of Sobieski ===
After the death of King Michał, she supported the candidacy of Charles V, Duke of Lorraine in the next election as king of Poland, as he was due to marry the queen dowager, meaning a continuation of Klara's influential role as court favorite. The victory of John III Sobieski in the election of 1674 was a disappointment: he was married to her former rival, Maria Kazimiera Sobieska, with whom she had a very unfriendly relationship. In 1676, she opposed the wedding between Michał Kazimierz Pac and the queen's sister Maria Anna d'Arquien de la Grange. In 1677, she promised the Brandenburg envoy Johannes von Hoverbeck that she would persuade her husband to influence the king to make peace with Brandenburg, but the relationship between her and her spouse had also deteriorated because of his adultery with Zofia Leszczyńska.

Widowed in 1684, she was left with a fortune in her dower lands, but died of cancer one year later.
