= Treaty of Arras =

There have been several treaties of Arras:

- Treaty of Arras (1435), between Charles VII of France and Philip the Good of Burgundy
- Treaty of Arras (1482), between Louis XI of France and the governments of the Low Countries
- Treaty of Arras (1579), signed in May 1579
- Union of Arras (January 1579), the pledge of loyalty to Spain by the Southern Netherlands
