= Pierre de Melun =

Prince of Espinoy

- Prince of Espinoy
- Born: First half of the 16th century Antoing
- Died: 1594; France
- Marie-Christine de Lalaing
- Issue: Guillaume de Melun
- Father: Hugues
- Mother: Yolande

Pierre de Melun (died 1594), prince of Espinoy, marquis of Richebourg, baron of Antoing, etc., was a nobleman in the Low Countries during the Dutch Revolt who took the side of the rebels against Philip II of Spain.

== Life ==
Melun was born in the first half of the 16th century, probably in Antoing, the son and heir of Hugues, count of Epinoy, and Yolande, lady of Warchin. He was the hereditary constable and senechal of the County of Hainaut. In 1576 the Estates General appointed him governor of the city and castle of Tournai and of the Tournaisis. In 1577 he was declared a rebel and his properties in the Low Countries were confiscated by the crown and awarded to his younger brother, Robert de Melun. At Robert's death they passed to his sister, Anne-Marie de Melun, who was married to Lamoral de Ligne.

Pierre de Melun was the leading figure in the rebel response to the reconciliation of the Walloon nobility of the Union of Arras in the Treaty of Arras (1579). On 13 October 1579 the Estates appointed him superintendent general of the city of Valenciennes and the citadel of Cambrai, and later governor of the shrinking number of rebel-held fortifications in the County of Artois, County of Hainaut, and Walloon Flanders. His mother's appeals to him in December 1580 to return to loyalty were unavailing. On 8 March 1581 he was appointed general of cavalry in the service of the States. He was absent from Tournai on campaign during the Siege of Tournai (1581), so the defence was directed by his lieutenant, with his wife since 1572, Marie-Christine de Lalaing, taking a leading role.

At the conclusion of the siege on 29 November 1581, Marie-Christine withdrew to Oudenaarde. On 10 February 1582, Melun was among the nobles who greeted Francis, Duke of Anjou, on his return from England with the intention of proclaiming him sovereign of the Low Countries. He later accompanied William the Silent to Ghent, but was no longer himself a leading figure in the Revolt. After Marie-Christine's death he remarried on 19 April 1586, with Hippolyte de Montmorency-Hornes. He died in exile in France in 1594. After his death his son, Guillaume de Melun, with diplomatic support from Henry IV of France, sought to recover at least some of his confiscated inheritance, reaching an agreement that was ratified by the government of the Sovereign Archdukes Albert and Isabella on 16 August 1602.
