= Siege of Grave (1602) =

Part of the Eighty Years' War and the Anglo–Spanish War

- Part of the Eighty Years' War & the Anglo–Spanish War
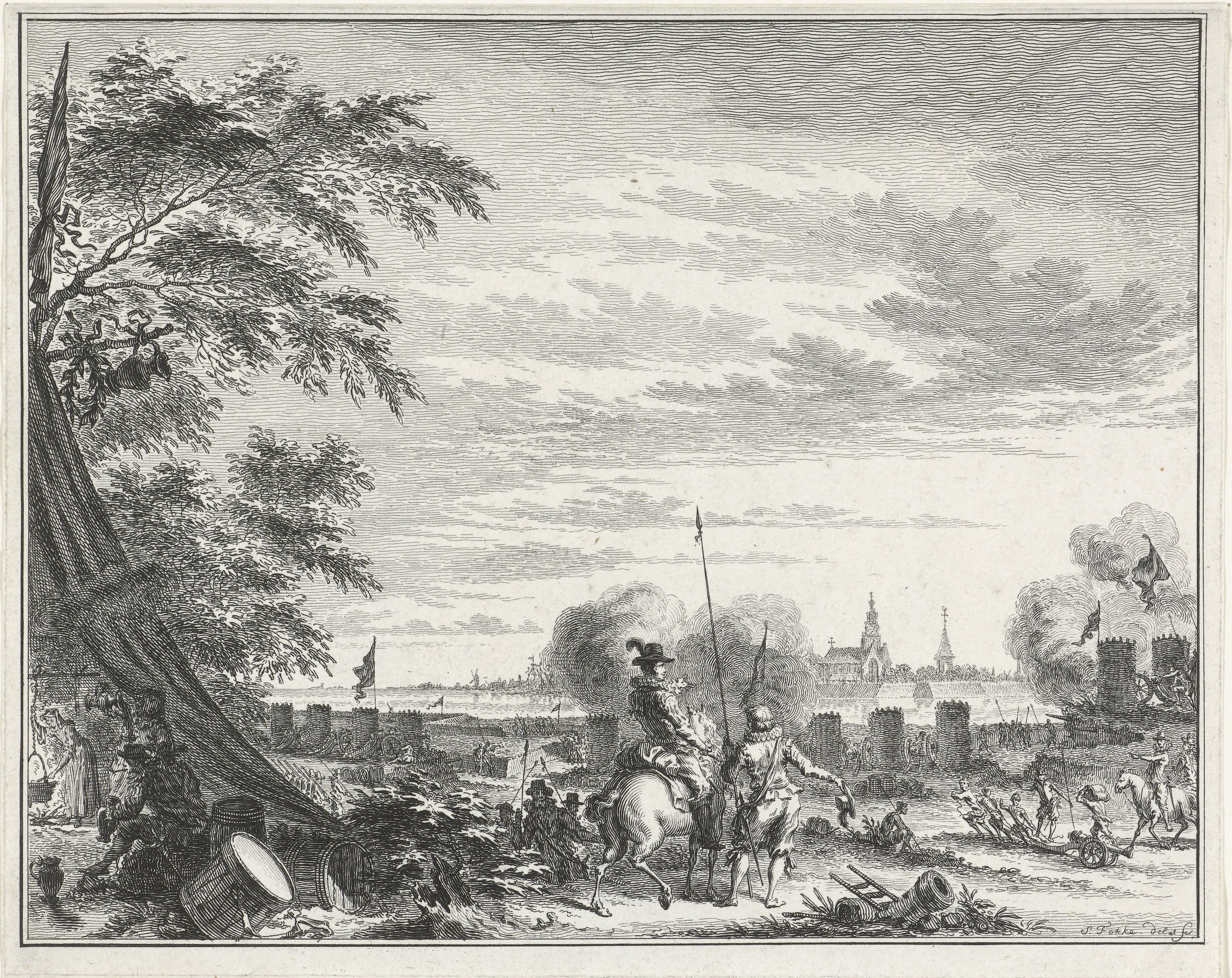
- Print of the siege by Simon Fokke
Date	18 July to 20 September 1602
Location	Grave (present-day the Netherlands) 51°45′33″N 5°44′18″E
Result	Anglo-Dutch victory

Belligerents
Dutch Republic; England	Spain

Commanders and leaders
(Dutch Republic) Maurice of Orange (England) Francis Vere (Dutch Republic) William Louis	(Spain) Antonio Gonzalez (surrendered) (Spain) Francisco de Mendoza

Strength
20,000	1,500 (Grave), 8,000 (Spanish relief army)

Casualties and losses
Unknown	~1,000 captured
- Location within Netherlands Siege of Grave (1602) (North Sea)

The siege of Grave was a siege that took place between 18 July and 20 September 1602, as part of the Eighty Years' War and the Anglo–Spanish War. The Spanish-held city of Grave was besieged by a Dutch and English army led by Maurice of Orange and Francis Vere respectively. After a siege of nearly two months the city surrendered when a Spanish relief army under Francisco de Mendoza was defeated just outside the city by the besiegers. The defeat was severe enough to cause a major mutiny in the Spanish army.

== Background ==
Prince Maurice of Orange had been actively campaigning against the Spanish armies in the Southern Netherlands and had successfully made sure that Ostend then under siege by Albert of Austria would be a key distraction while he took the rest of the Spanish garrisons that were still in the Republic. Maurice in his first objective successfully besieged and took Rheinberg, an important stronghold on the Rhine from the Spanish in July 1601.

Meanwhile, Francis Vere had successfully defeated a massive Spanish assault in Ostend in January the same year. The veteran Englishman with his troops stuck in Ostend proved an issue – the states general demanded that Vere would be better served in the field with Maurice. After this had been agreed the garrison of Ostend was replaced by fresh troops along with a new governor – Frederick van Dorp. Vere left in March and was back in the field with a large portion of English troops (many newly recruited) numbering 8,000 men and many of them veterans from the siege at Ostend.

On arriving at the Hague, Vere at once joined the army of Maurice and as soon as both forces had assembled which then numbered nearly 20,000 men, they crossed the Waal at Nijmegen, and the Maas at Mook, advanced thence into the heart of Brabant. Maurice found his progress towards Tienen opposed by Francisco López de Mendoza, who was strongly entrenched – he refused to be tempted out while Maurice refused to engage or pass while leaving a large force in his rear. Maurice then turned back to the north with the intention of besieging Grave or Venlo; the former was chosen.

Grave was an important town on the Maas and had been captured in 1586 by Alexander Farnese, Duke of Parma and from then was under Spanish control. Grave's defences were steadily improved and was completely surrounded with field fortifications making any frontal assault out of the question.

== Siege ==
By mid-July the Dutch and English forces had marched towards the city of Grave; the right wing composed of the English foot commanded by Sir Francis Vere, the centre corps by the Count William Louis, and the left by Count Ernest of Nassau. The Commentaries of Vere showed that the army moved in three columns on as many contiguous lines of march. The defenders of the city numbered over 1,500 Spanish and Italian soldiers under the command of Don Antonio Gonzalez and were hoping to hold out for more than two months before a relief column could arrive. At the same time a detached number of Spanish forces led by Mendoza and Ambrosio Spinola pursued Maurice, but undeterred the besiegers pressed on towards Grave.

On 18 July the Anglo-Dutch force had arrived, surrounded Grave, and soon dug in around the city – laying and constructing a trench system. The now besieged tried to bring in as many reinforcements as possible but this was in vain when it was cut off. The Dutch and English siege positions were large in scale with every redoubt having its own wet ditch and drawbridge, and of which took nearly five hours to complete a circuit.

The Spanish garrison in the city were in the hope that there would be relief relied on from nearby Venlo under Francisco Mendoza who had arrived with a force in late July. Mendoza went out with the aim of relieving Grave but soon discovered the significant size of the Dutch and English besieging force when the leading part of the Spanish column ran into strong positions and were repelled with loss. The city garrison on hearing the news of Mendoza close by at the same time made several unsuccessful sallies on the besieging army wasting men and supplies. This abruptly stopped when they heard news that Mendoza's troops were forced to turn back to Venlo in late August; mutinies also played their part in the Spanish retreat.

During the relief attempt Vere was inspecting the English trenches when heavy fighting broke out as a sally was launched on the position. The Spanish were repelled but Vere was severely injured when a bullet went through his head beneath his eye and became embedded in his skull. For Vere it would be the end of the war but the bullet was removed as he took up rest in Ryswick and was not able to take to the field again by the end of the year. As a consequence of Vere's wound the young Frederick Henry, who was only eighteen years old, took over Vere's command, while Horace Vere (brother to Francis) took over the English troops in the field. The Earl of Leicester arrived at the siege in late August in case Francis' wound was mortal and needed to fill in his command but this was denied by Queen Elizabeth I.

At the beginning of September the besiegers were running into trouble as the water levels from the Mass caused by heavy rains began to rise rapidly. Before long it had risen so quickly that Maurice even considered raising the whole siege altogether and pondered to make a hasty retreat – he had made calls for the garrison to surrender. Luckily for Maurice the Grave garrison was on it knees and on 20 September Gonzalez accepted Maurice's terms and surrendered. Breakout of diseases, rising waters, a severe lack of food, and news that the relief force had been turned back which as a result initiated a large mutiny meant that the Spanish had no choice.

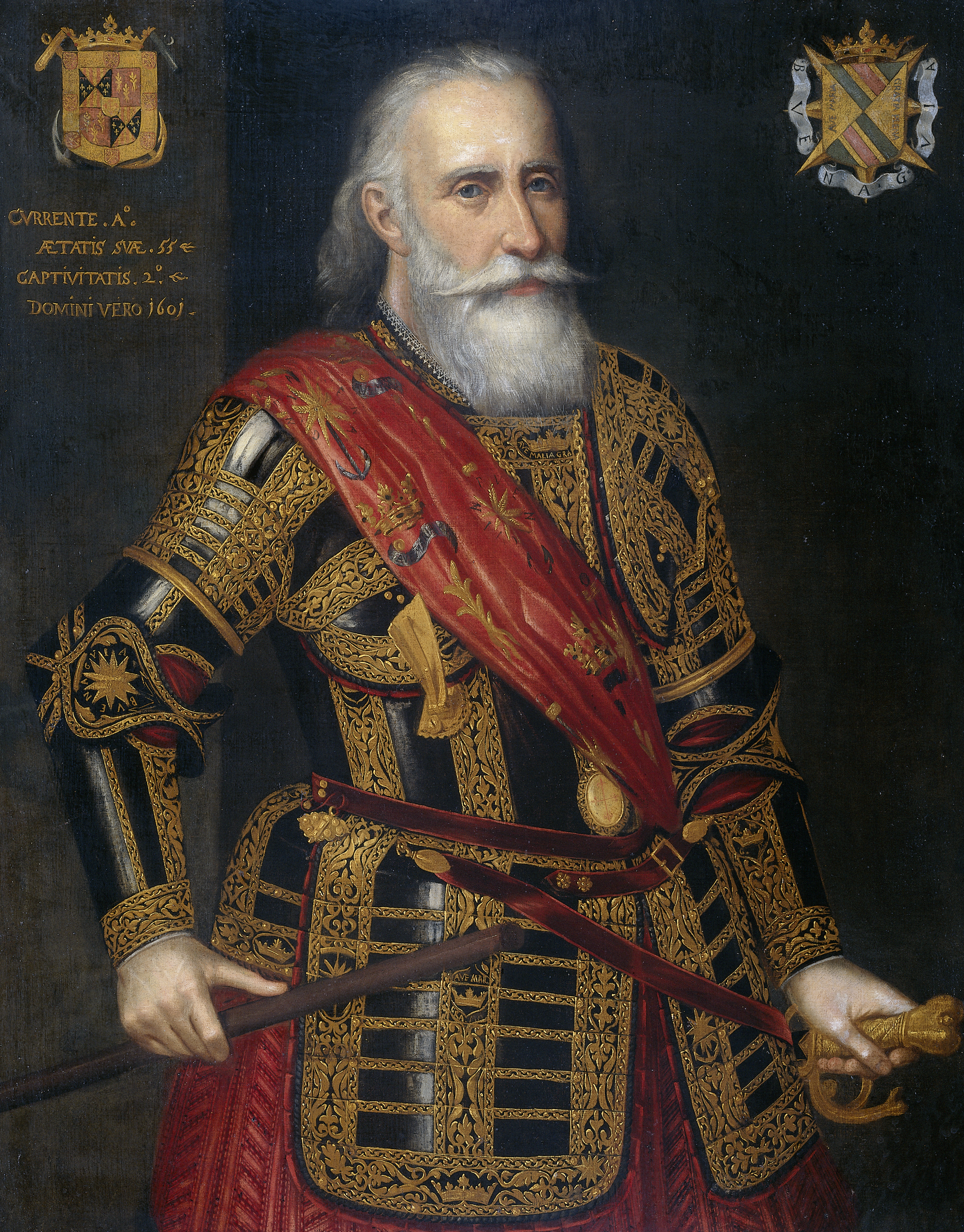
Francisco de Mendoza

Envoys of the Aceh Sultanate visit Maurice at Grave

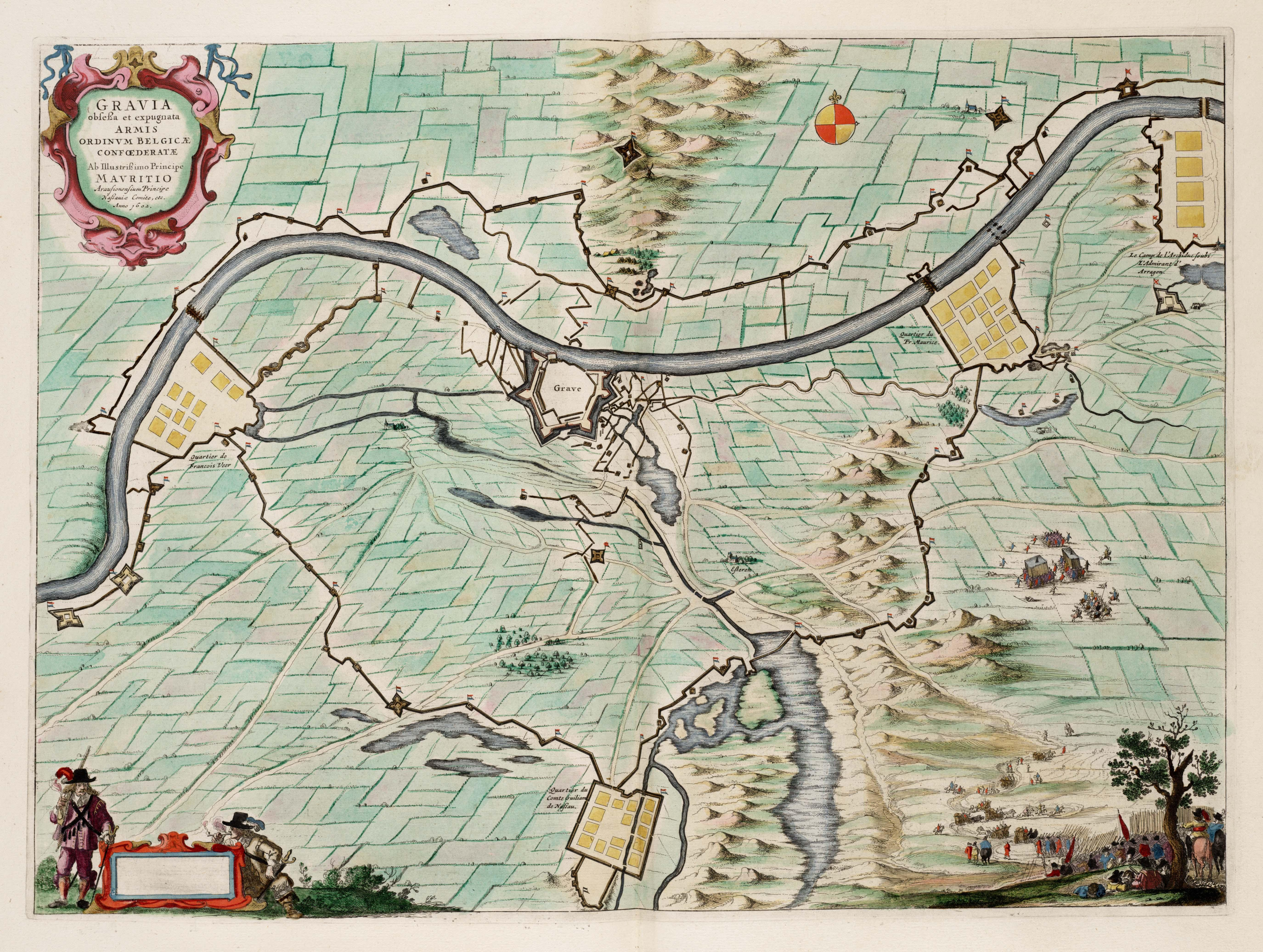
Map of the siege in 1602 – from the Atlas van Loon

== Aftermath ==
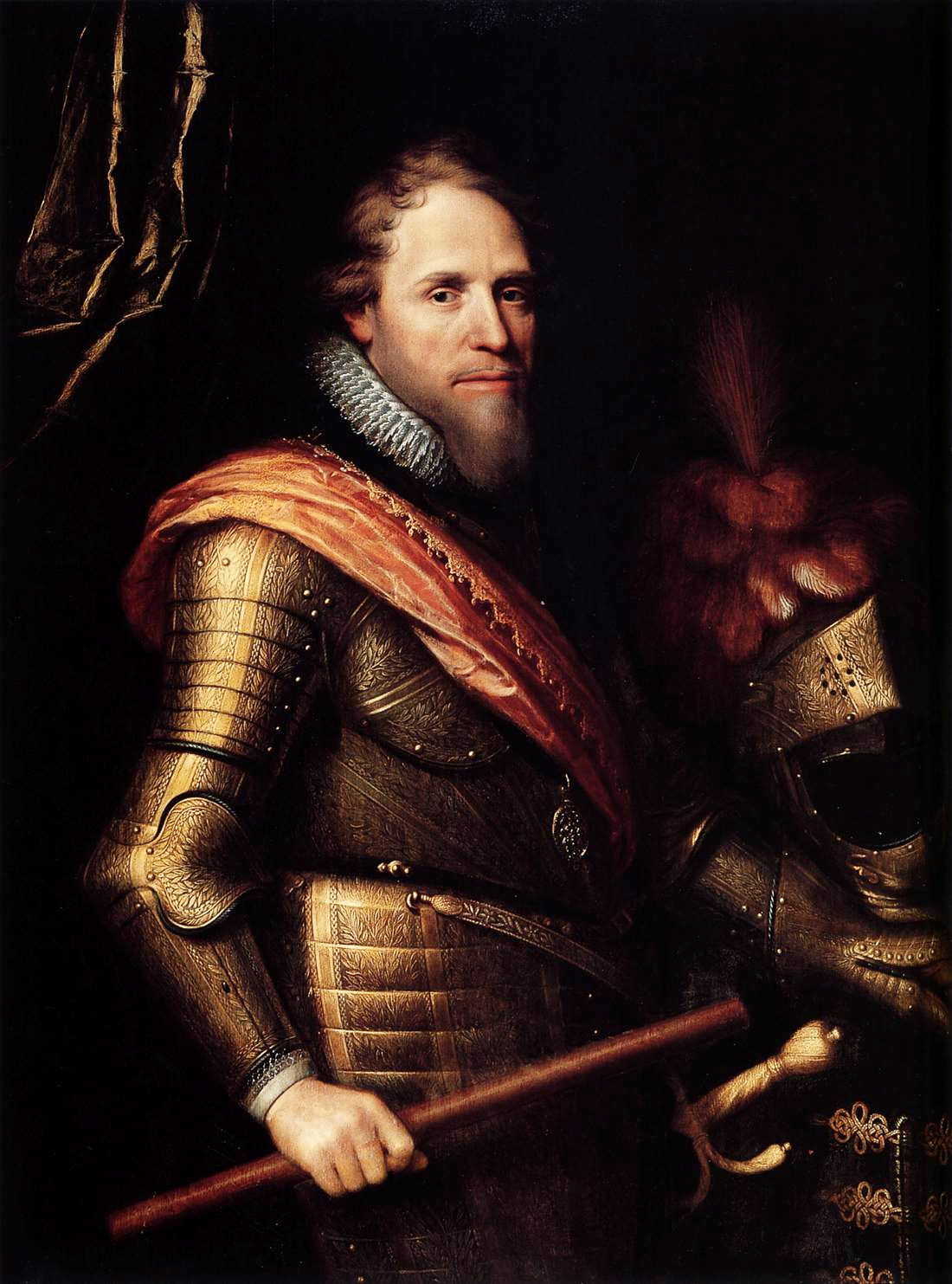
Maurice of Orange

After a total of sixty days and with the siege over, the Spanish army were allowed to leave with arms and colours and the Dutch and English entered Grave triumphantly the following day.

On 28 September Maurice was inaugurated as count of the country in Grave in a building of its suburbs that in 1559 was given to his father, William of Orange.

With the failure of the break up of the siege, a mutiny broke out amongst the Spanish troops because of arrears of pay and about 1,200 soldiers deserted in Venlo. As a force they captured Hamont and then fled to Hoogstraten with the rest of the Spanish troops on their heels before making a deal with Maurice. In the terms given to the mutineers by Maurice Grave was to be garrisoned by them and kept in their hands before being returned to Dutch control by the end of 1603. While Grave surrendered Maurice heard the news that Albert's troops were making no progress in the siege at Ostend.

The following year was one of indecision by both Maurice and the states general. In addition the death of Elizabeth and the crowning of King James I of England put operations on hold whilst Grand pensionary Johan van Oldenbarnevelt made talks with the English court and parliament. The talks however got nowhere and the campaign resumed in 1603 with Ostend still under siege. Maurice managed to retake Wachtendonk in March 1603 and Sluis in the Southern Netherlands in August 1604, but the Spanish forces, despite suffering heavy losses, did not raise the siege of Ostend and it capitulated in September 1604.

Grave would stay in Dutch hands for the rest of the war and was garrisoned largely by English troops until 1648.

== Bibliography ==
- Black, Jeremy (2005). European Warfare, 1494–1660 Warfare and History. Routledge. ISBN 978-1134477081.
- Belleroche, Edward (2012). The Siege of Ostend; Or the New Troy, 1601–1604. General Books. ISBN 978-1151203199.
- Borman, Tracy (1997). Sir Francis Vere in the Netherlands, 1589–1603: A Re-evaluation of His Career as Sergeant Major General of Elizabeth I's Troops. University of Hull.
- Dalton, Charles (2012). Life and Times of General Sir Edward Cecil, Viscount Wimbledon, Colonel of an English Regiment in the Dutch Service, 1605–1631, and One of His Majesty. HardPress. ISBN 978-1407753157.
- Duerloo, Luc (2013). Dynasty and Piety: Archduke Albert (1598–1621) and Habsburg Political Culture in an Age of Religious Wars. Ashgate Publishing, Ltd. ISBN 978-1409483069.
- Duffy, Christopher (2013). Siege Warfare: The Fortress in the Early Modern World 1494–1660 Volume 1 of Siege warfare. Routledge. ISBN 978-1136607875.
- Dunthorne, Hugh (2013). Britain and the Dutch Revolt 1560–1700. Cambridge University Press. ISBN 978-0521837477.
- Fissel, Mark Charles (2001). English warfare, 1511–1642; Warfare and history. London: Routledge. ISBN 978-0415214810.
- Hadfield, Andrew; Hammond, Paul, eds. (2014). Shakespeare And Renaissance Europe Arden Critical Companions. A&C Black. ISBN 978-1408143681.
- Markham, C. R. (2007). The Fighting Veres: Lives Of Sir Francis Vere And Sir Horace Vere. Kessinger Publishing. ISBN 978-1432549053.
- Motley, John Lothrop. The Rise of the Dutch Republic, Entire 1566–74.
- van Nimwegen, Olaf (2010). The Dutch Army and the Military Revolutions, 1588–1688 Volume 31 of Warfare in History Series. Boydell & Brewer. ISBN 978-1843835752.
- Wap, Johannes Jacobus Franciscus (1858). Geschiedenis van het land en der heeren van Cuyk. Kemink en zoon. (Dutch)
- Wernham, R.B. (1994). The Return of the Armadas: The Last Years of the Elizabethan Wars Against Spain 1595–1603. Oxford: Clarendon Press. ISBN 978-0198204435.
- Williams, Penry (1998). The Later Tudors: England, 1547–1603. Oxford University Press. ISBN 0192880446.
