= Havré Castle =

Castle in Wallonia, Belgium

Coordinates: 50.463°N 4.039°E

- Wallonia, Belgium
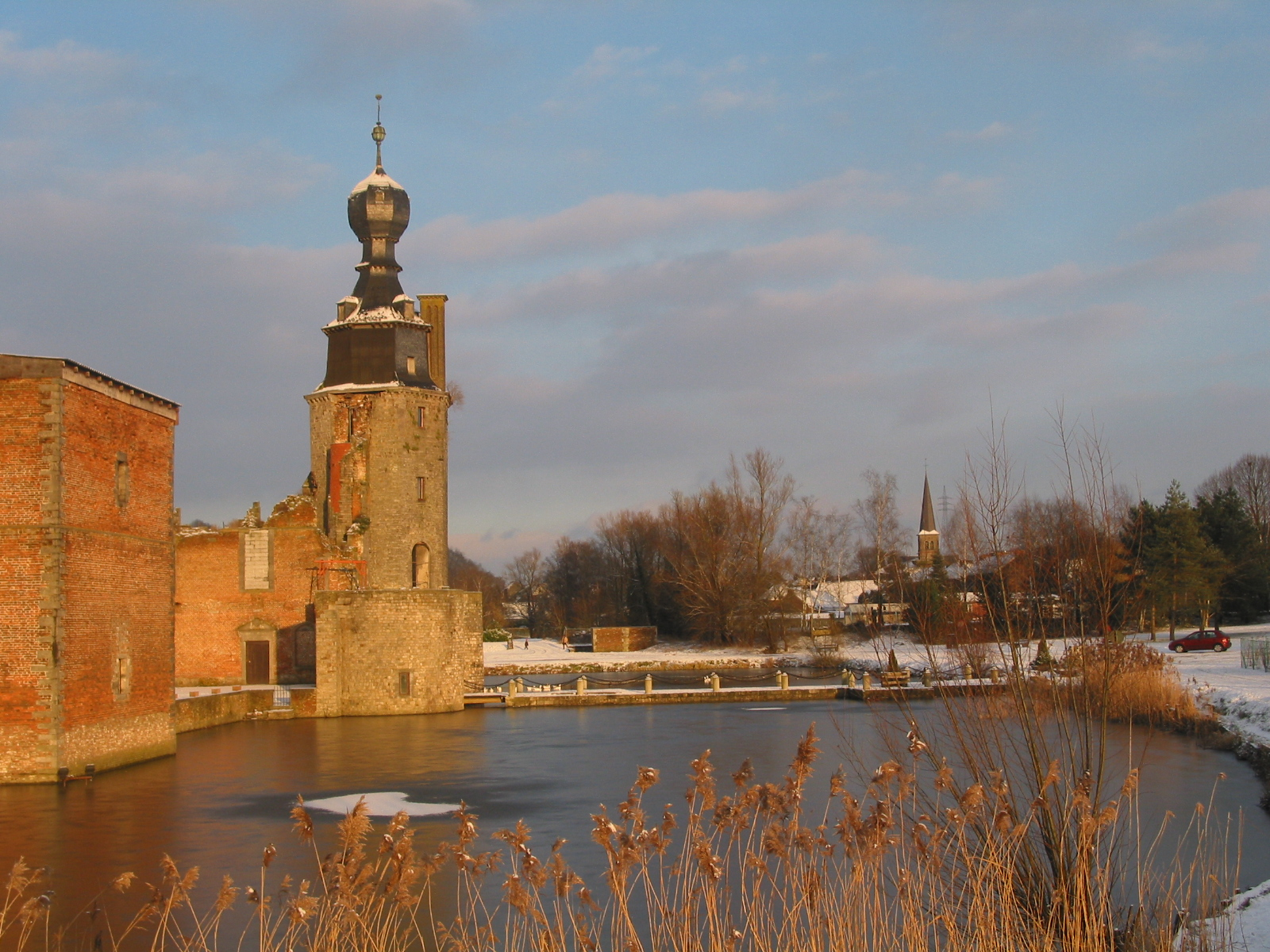

Site information
- Type: Castle

Havré Castle (French: Château d'Havré) is a ruined castle in the village of Havré in the town of Mons, province of Hainaut, Wallonia, Belgium.

== History ==
The origins of the castle can be only traced back to the year 1226, even the counts of Flanders and Hainaut have had control over Havré since the 11th century. In 1255 Ida of Mons was married to Engelbert d'Enghien. Their descendants keep Havré Castle to the year 1423. Then Gérard d'Enghien passes the Castle on to Christophe d'Harcourt. Through marriage, the castle came into the possession of the families Dunan, Longeville and Croy.

Coat of Arms Croÿ-Havré

In 1518 Philip II de Croÿ commander of Emperor Charles V, became the owner of the castle. By 1537 he was in charge of County of Hainault as grand bailiff and governor. Phillipe married on 9 August 1548 Anna of Lorraine (* July 25, 1522, † May 15, 1568) as his second wife, a daughter of the Duke Anton II of Lorraine. He died before the birth of his son Charles-Philippe ( 1 September 1549 - Brussels † 25 November 1613 - in Burgundy ). Wounded by a musket Charles-Philippe was treated by Ambroise Paré at Castle Havré, who was the first surgeon to French King Charles IX and a prominent surgeon of his time.

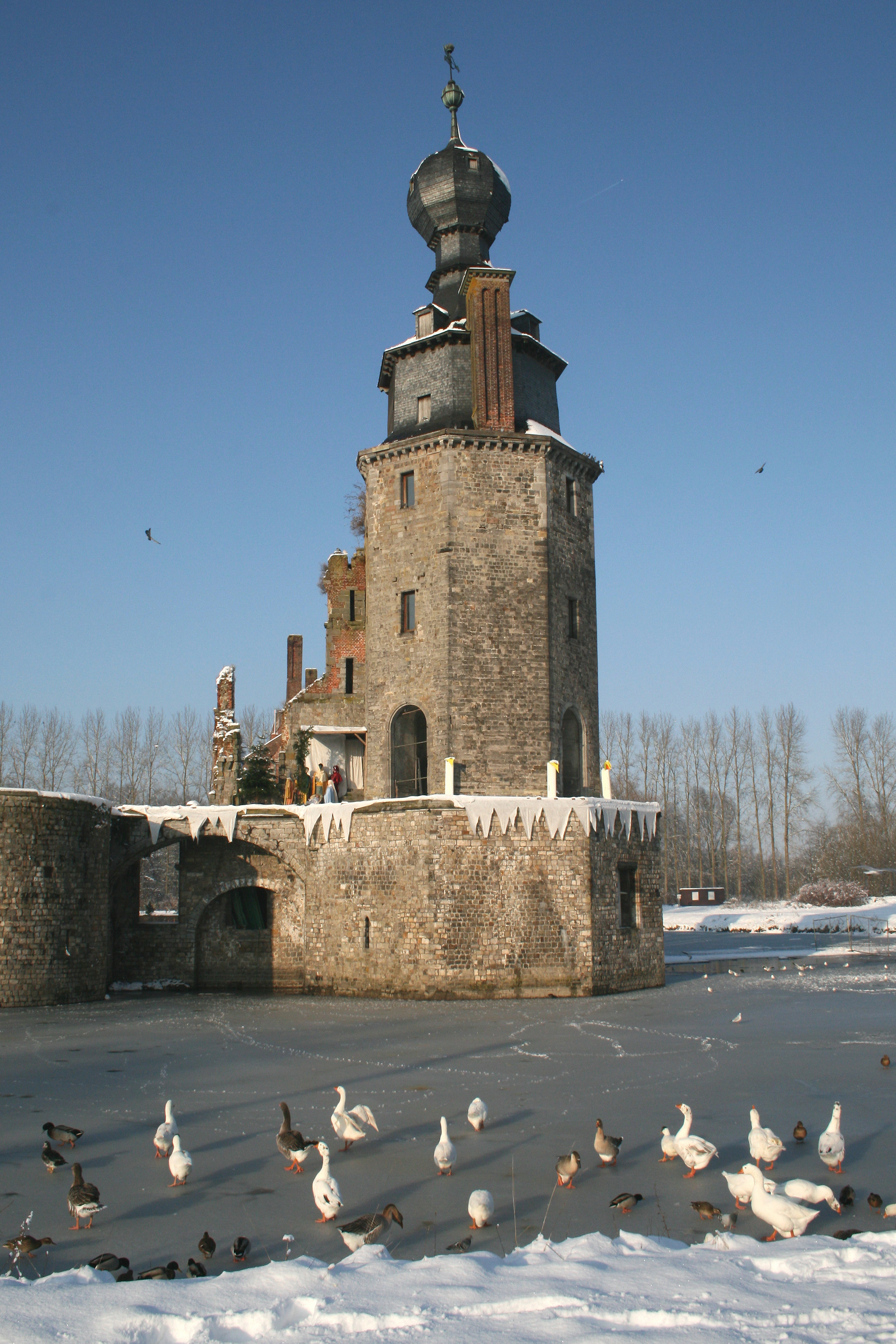
The ruins of the castle.

In 1578, the castle underwent its roughest period with siege by the armies of Don Juan de Austria and the Duke of Anjou. The castle was kept without much damage. Unfortunately, in 1579 a fire was fierce and devastating burning the castle to the walls.

During the seventeenth century Charles Alexander, Duke of Croy, restored the castle and made it one of the most magnificent castles of pleasure in Belgium, where many royals and famous artists of the time liked to stay.

Shortly after the French invasion of 1792, it was quickly sold as national property. Despite its acquisition in 1807 by the family of Croy, the castle was gradually abandoned.

In the beginning of the twentieth century, continued neglect transformed the remaining castle into ruins.

== See also ==
- List of castles in Belgium
