= Havré =

Sub-municipality of the city of Mons, Belgium

Havré Avrè (Walloon)
- Sub-municipality of Mons
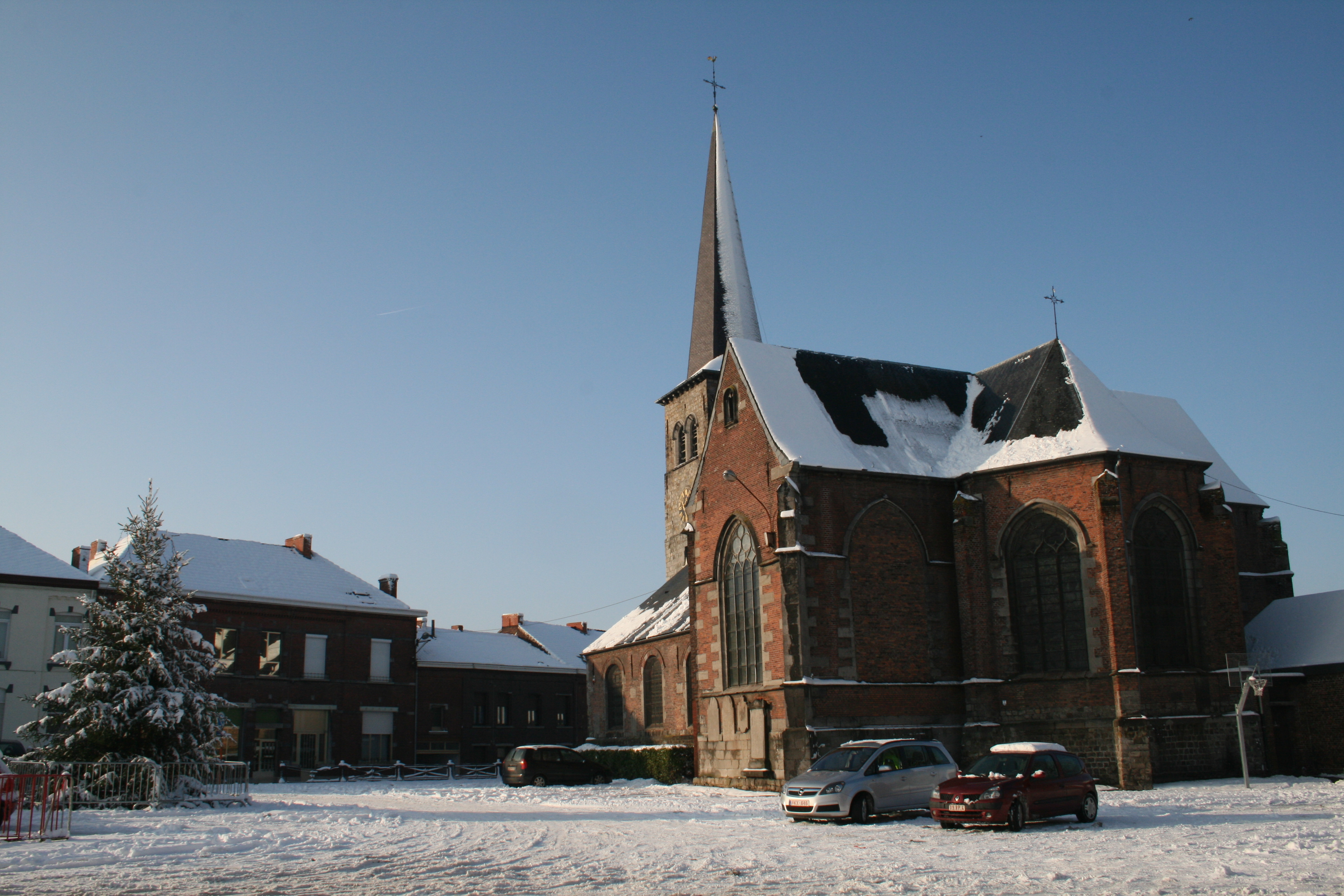
- St. Martin Church

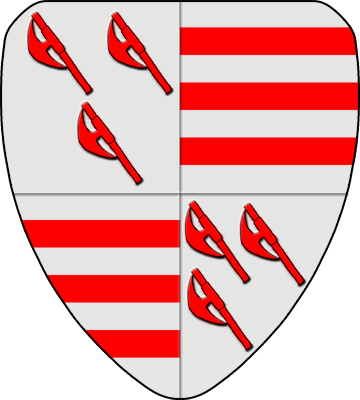
- Coat of arms

- Location of Havré in Mons
- Interactive map of Havré
- Location within Belgium Location within Hainaut (Belgium)
- Coordinates: 50°27′52″N 4°02′43″E
- Country: Belgium
- Community: French Community
- Region: Wallonia
- Province: Hainaut
- Arrondissement: Mons
- Municipality: Mons

Area
  - Total: 17.94 km^{2} (6.93 sq mi)

Population (2020-01-01)
  - Total: 6,211
  - Density: 346.2/km^{2} (896.7/sq mi)
- Postal codes: 7021
- Area codes: 065

Havré (French pronunciation: [avʁe]; Walloon: Avrè) is a sub-municipality of the city of Mons located in the province of Hainaut, Wallonia, Belgium. It was a separate municipality until 1977. On 1 January 1977, it was merged into Mons.

== Etymology ==
The village's name would likely originate from the old name Haverec. However, etymologists are uncertain about the origin and meaning of the name. Some say it would mean Country of the hops, some other think it would mean cleared ground, and more recently a German line of thought associate it with a German word that could translate to wild ash tree.

== Geography ==
Havré is a village situated at the confines of the Borinage and the Centre region. It is traversed by the Canal du Centre and the Haine river. It is situated next to Boussoit, Bray, Mons, Obourg, Saint-Symphorien, Ville-sur-Haine, and Villers-Saint-Ghislain.

== Economy ==
Havré was a wealthy municipality from the 19th century to 1950, with forests, salt refinery, tannery, tabac fabric, gunpowder factory, glass factory, phosphate quarry, but mostly thanks to coal mines which employed more than a thousand people.

In 1960, after the last coal mine closed, the village became a commuter-town for people mainly working in Brussels, Mons, and Charleroi.

In the tertiary sector of the economy, Havré counts small and medium supermarkets, and there are retail and handicraft shops. Sport is also developed with infrastructure for tennis, football, and basketball.

== Population ==
- 1837 : 1869 inhabitants
- 1846 : 2043 inhabitants
- 1860 : 1155 inhabitants
- 1870 : 1915 inhabitants
- 1910 : 3689 inhabitants
- 1929 : 3713 inhabitants
- 1961 : 5225 inhabitants
- 1976 : 5390 inhabitants
- 1990 : 5500 inhabitants
- 2001 : 5930 inhabitants
- 2004 : 5856 inhabitants
- 2011 : 6157 inhabitants

== Places ==
- Havré Castle
- Train station
- Place d’Havré (town square)
- Church Saint-Martin (on the town square)
- Priory of Saint-Antoine-in-Barbefosse
- Chapel of Bon-Vouloir (Good-will)

== Gallery ==
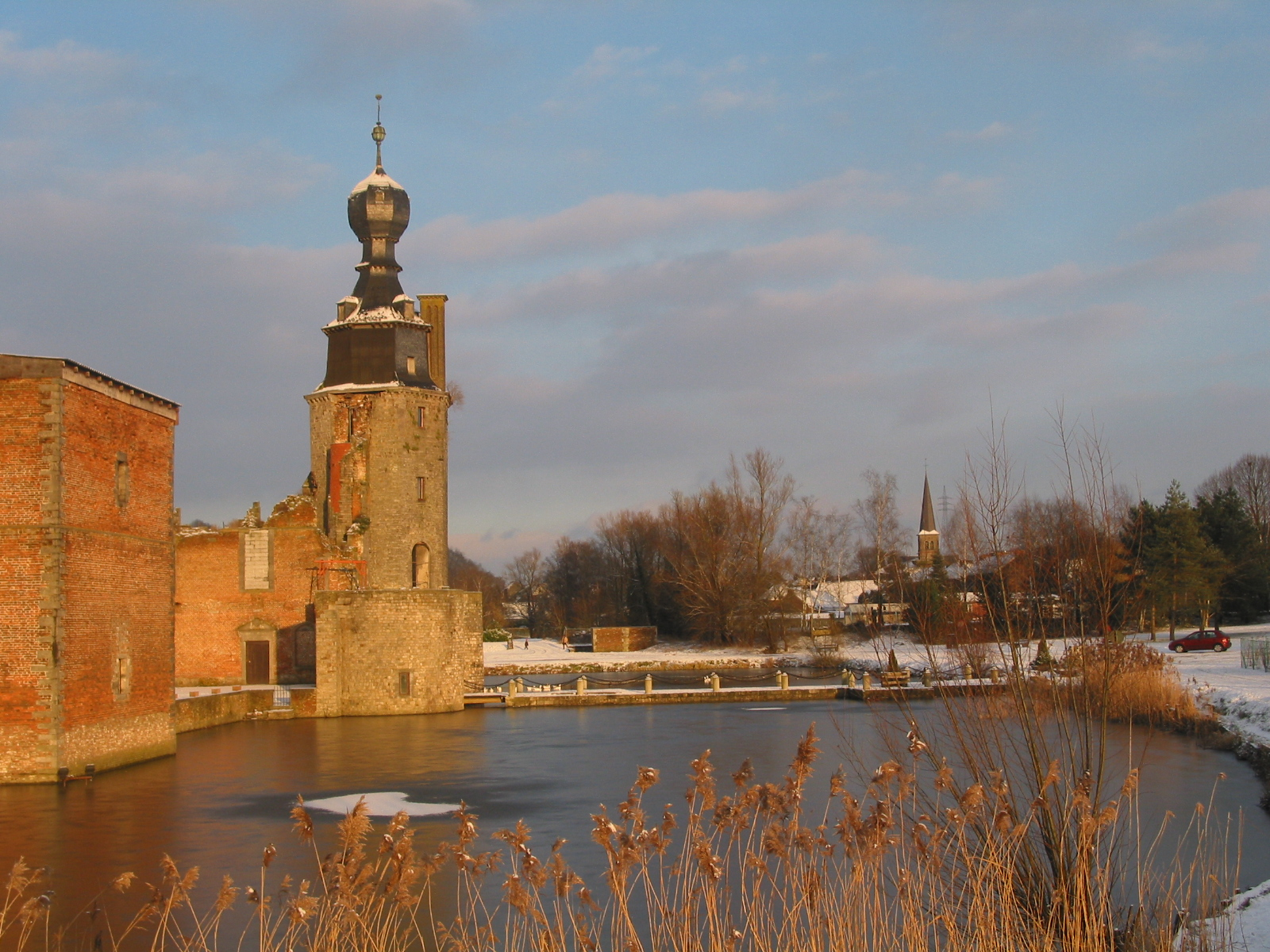
Havré, Old Castle.

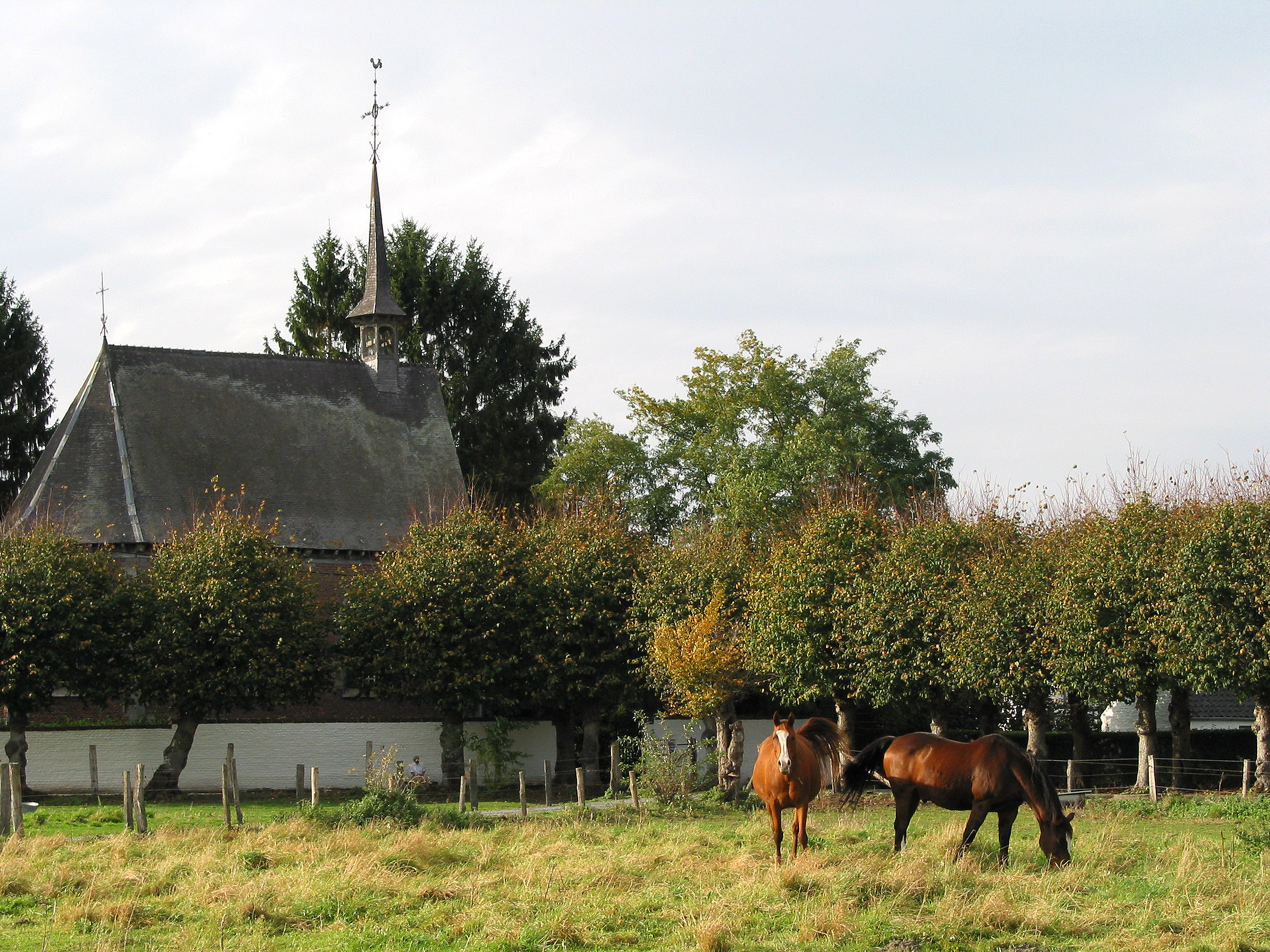
Havré, Chapel of "Bon Vouloir" (17th century).

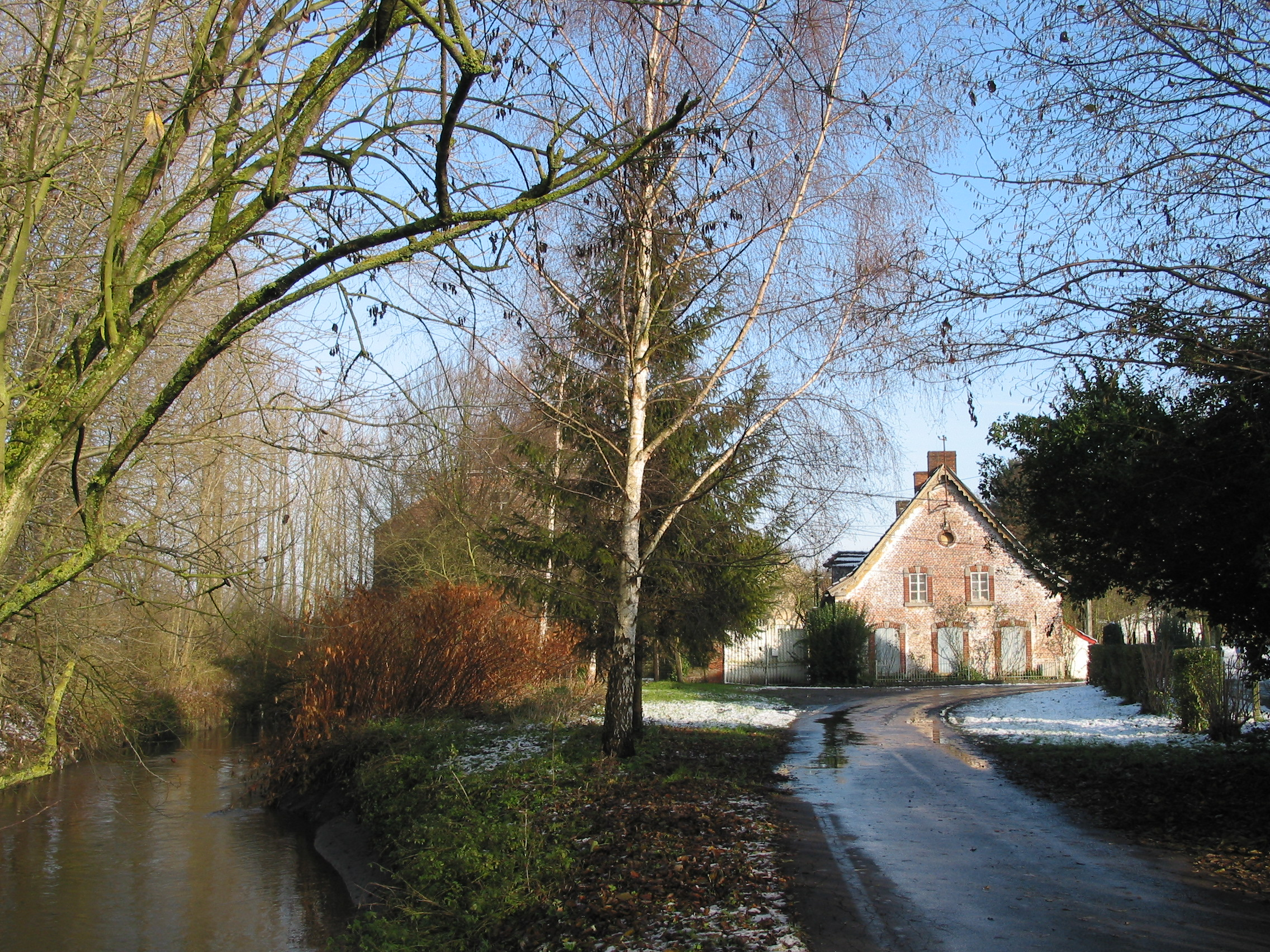
Havré, Old water mill (19th century).

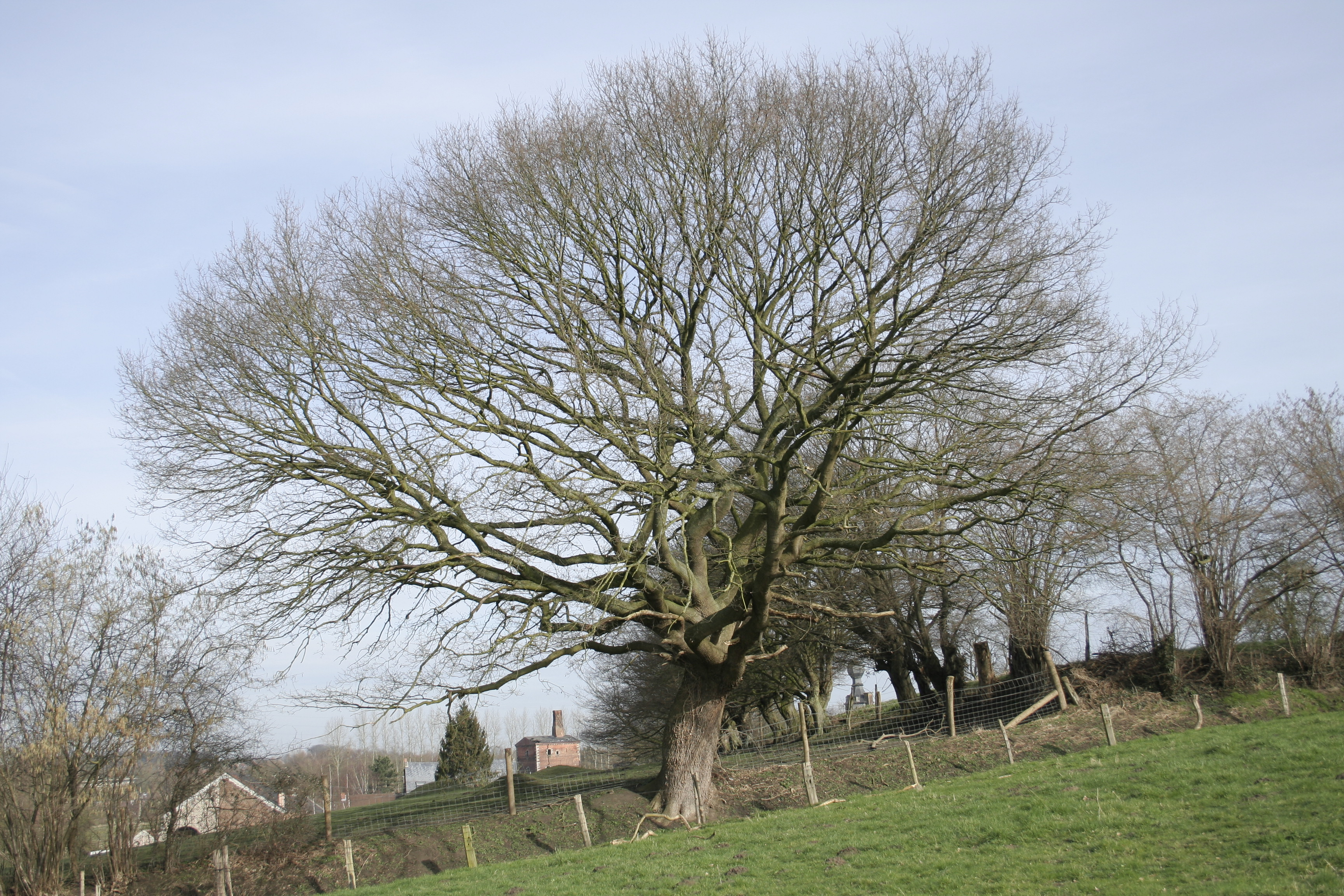
Havré, Old Oak.

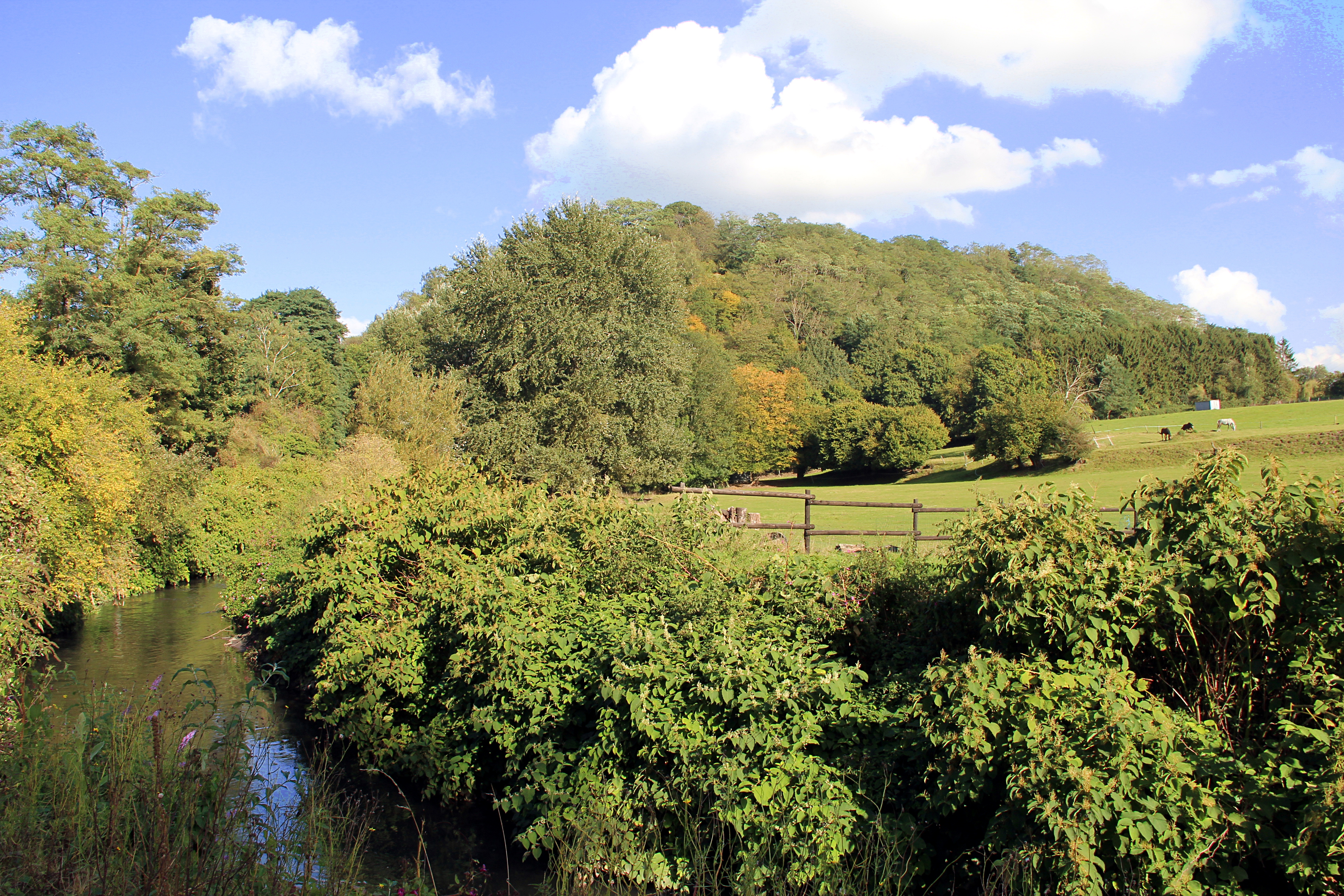
Terril N°1 (spoil tip Nr 1).

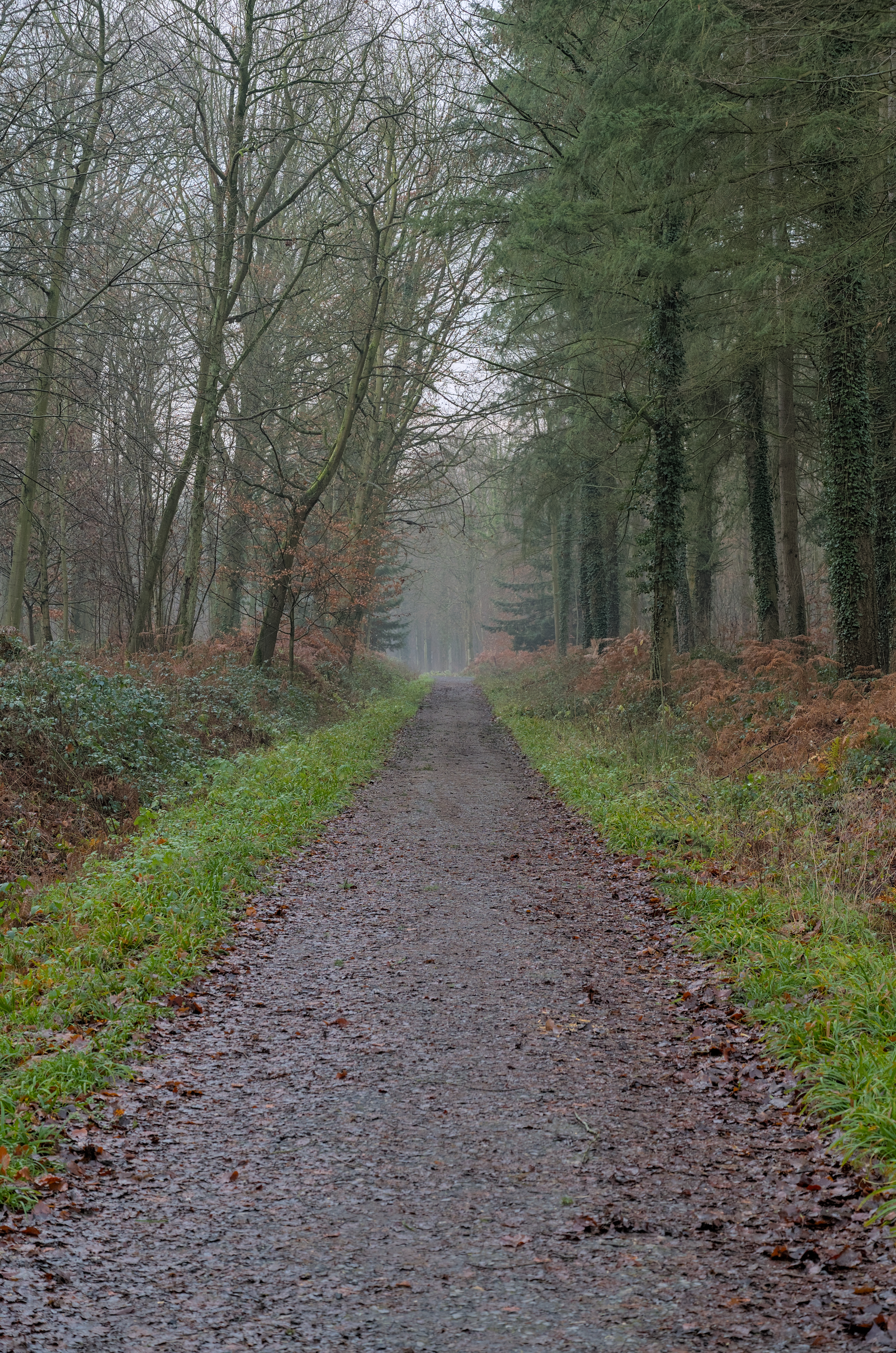
Bois d'Havré (forest)
