= Geneviève d'Urfé =

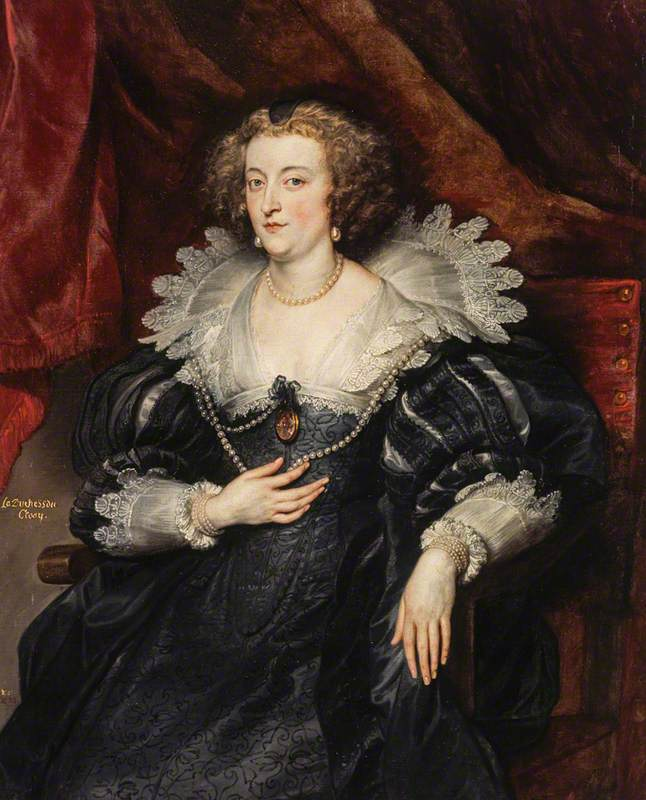
After Anthony van Dyck, Portrait of Geneviève d'Urfé, c. 1628 (National Galleries Scotland)

Geneviève de Lascaris d'Urfé or d'Ursé (1597–1656) was a 17th-century French noblewoman. She was the daughter of Marie de Neufville and Jacques II, marquis of Urfé and Baugé, count of Chateauneuf, baron of Virieu and Marignange, knight of the Order of Saints Maurice and Lazarus. She was a lady-in-waiting to Marie de' Medici, queen mother of France. On 6 January 1617 a marriage contract was concluded for her wedding to Charles Alexandre de Croÿ, Marquis of Havré. She was his second wife. Her correspondence with him from the years 1617–1621 has been preserved in the Belgian State Archives. At the Brussels court, she was reputedly the mistress of Ambrogio Spinola. After her husband's murder in November 1624, she went on to marry twice more. Her second husband was Guy de Harcourt, baron of Sierray, of the House of Harcourt, and her third was Vice-admiral Antoine de Mailly, lord of Frettes, of the de Mailly family. Her daughter with her third husband was Claire Isabelle Eugenie de Mailly.
