= François de la Noue =

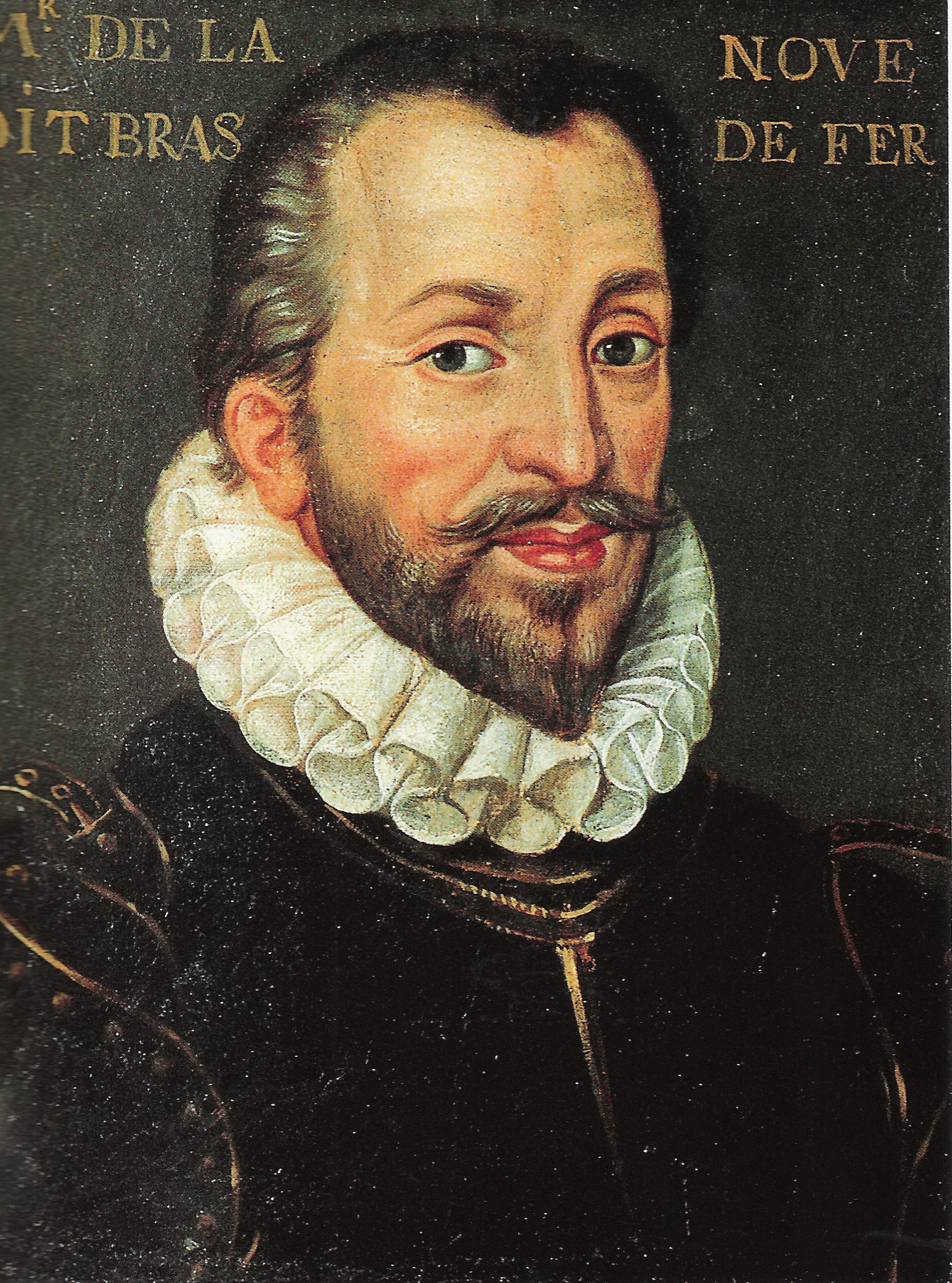
François de La Noue

François de la Noue (1531 – August 4, 1591), called Bras-de-Fer (Iron Arm), was one of the Huguenot captains of the 16th century. He was born near Nantes in 1531, of an ancient Breton family.

He served in Italy under Marshal Brissac, and in the first Huguenot war, but his first great exploit was the capture of Orléans at the head of only fifteen cavaliers in 1567, during the second war. During the third war, at the battle of Jarnac in March 1569 he commanded the rearguard, and at Moncontour the following October he was taken prisoner; but he was exchanged in time to resume the governorship of Poitou, and to inflict a signal defeat on the royalist troops before Rochefort.

At the siege of Fontenay (1570) his left arm was shattered by a bullet and later amputated; but a mechanic of La Rochelle made him an artificial iron arm (hence his sobriquet) with a hook for holding his reins. When peace was made in France in the same year, La Noue carried his sword against the Spaniards in the Netherlands, but was taken at the recapture of Mons by the Spanish in 1572.

Permitted to return to France, he was commissioned by Charles IX, after the St. Bartholomew's Day massacre, to reconcile the inhabitants of La Rochelle, the great stronghold of the Huguenots, to the king (see Siege of La Rochelle (1572-1573)). But the Rochellois were too much alarmed to come to terms; and La Noue, perceiving that war was imminent, and knowing that his post was on the Huguenot side, gave up his royal commission, and from 1574 till 1578 acted as general of La Rochelle.

When peace was again concluded La Noue once more went to aid the Protestants of the Low Countries. In 1579, together with the Englishman John Norreys, he led the Dutch States' army at the Battle of Borgerhout, where Alexander Farnese, Spanish Governor of the Netherlands, defeated them. He took several towns and captured Count Egmont in 1580; but a few weeks afterwards he fell into the hands of Robert de Melun, a commander in the Army of Flanders. La Noue was imprisoned in Limburg, and kept confined for five years. Negotiations for his release in exchange for the royalist commander Jean de Noircarmes, who had been captured by forces loyal to Francis, Duke of Anjou, came to nothing.

It was in captivity that La Noue wrote his celebrated Discours politiques et militaires, a work which was published at Basel in 1587, La Rochelle in 1590, London (in English) in 1587, Frankfurt on Main (in German) in 1592 and 1612. It had an immense influence on the soldiers of all nations. The abiding value of La Noue's Discourses lies in the fact that he wrote of war as a human drama, before it had been elaborated and codified.

At length, in June 1585, La Noue was exchanged for Philip, Count of Egmont and other important prisoners, while a heavy ransom and a pledge not to bear arms against the King of Spain were also exacted from him. Between 1586 and 1589 La Noue lived in Geneve and took no part in public matters, but in that year he joined Henry of Navarre against the Leaguers. He was present at both sieges of Paris, at Ivry and other battles. At the siege of Lamballe in Brittany he received a wound of which he died at Moncontour on August 4, 1591.

== Works ==
He wrote, besides the Discourses,

- Declaration pour prise d'armées et la défeute de Sedan et Jarnets (1588)
- Observations sur l'histoire de Guicciardini, 2 vols, (1592)
- Notes on Plutarch's Lives.

His Correspondence was published in 1854.
