= Saint-Ghislain Abbey =

Monastery in Haine, Belgium

- Abbaye de Saint-Ghislain
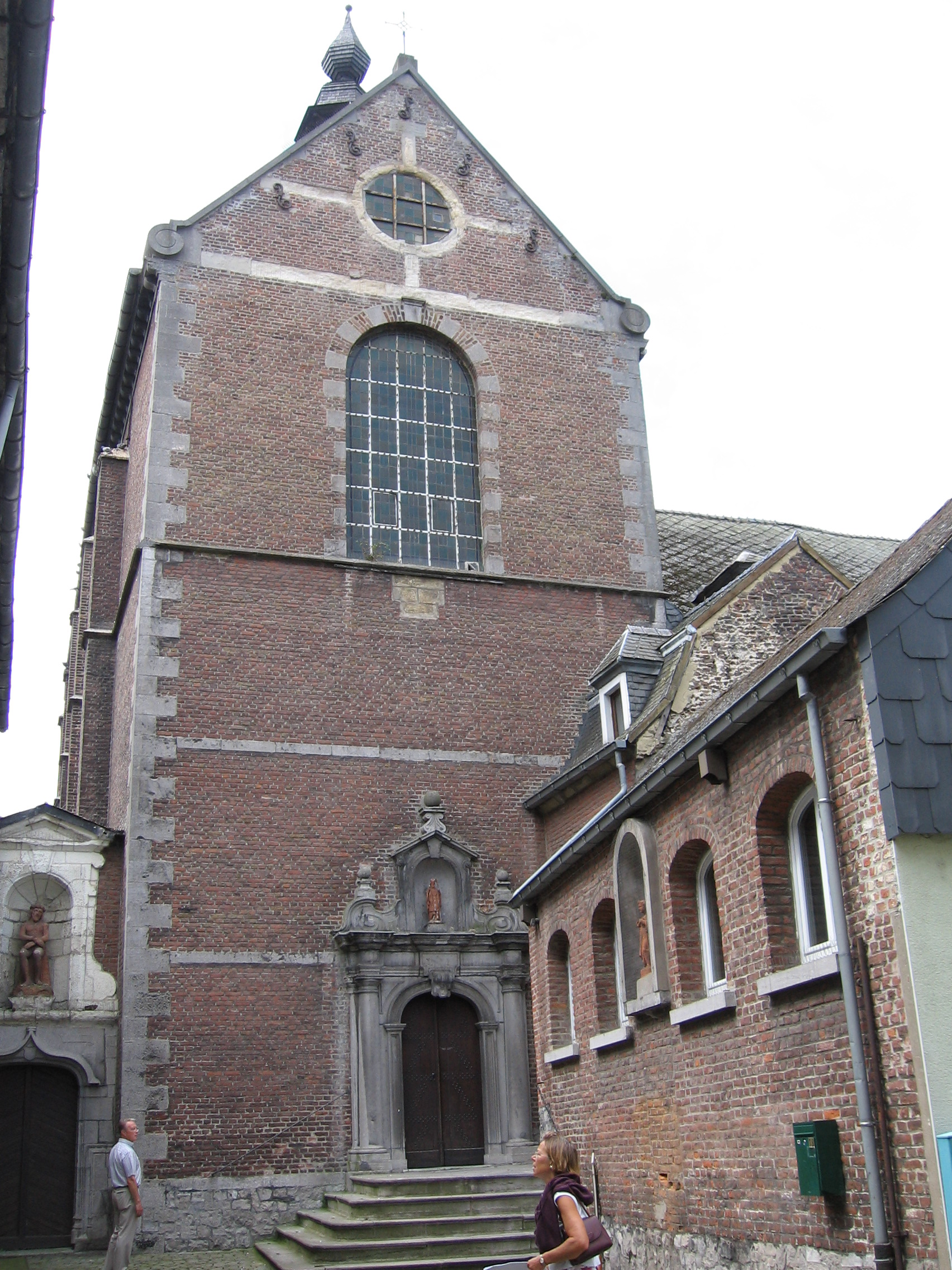
- The chapel of the monastery's hospital
- Interactive map of Saint-Ghislain Abbey

Monastery information
- Order: Order of Saint Benedict
- Established: around 650; Benedictine from around 940
- Disestablished: 1796

People
- Founder: Saint Ghislain

Site
- Coordinates: 50°26′54″N 3°49′10″E

Saint-Ghislain Abbey (French: Abbaye de Saint-Ghislain) was a monastery founded by Saint Ghislain around 650, located in Wallonia on the Haine (Hainaut, Belgium). It became a Benedictine monastery around 940, when reformed by Gérard of Brogne, and was suppressed in 1796.

== History ==
On 2 June 965, Otto I, Holy Roman Emperor, confirmed Godfrey of Lower Lotharingia's gift to the abbey of 18 mansi of land in Villers-Saint-Ghislain.

== Notable members ==
- Mathieu Moulart

== See also ==
- List of Christian monasteries in Belgium
