= Mutiny of Hoogstraten =

Longest mutiny by Army of Flanders soldiers during Eighty Years' War

- Date: 1 September 1602 – 18 May 1604
- Location: Hoogstraten, Habsburg Netherlands; 51.3997°N 4.7667°E
- Also known as: the Union of Hoogstraten
- Cause: arrears of pay
- Participants: soldiers of the Army of Flanders

The Mutiny of Hoogstraten (1 September 1602 – 18 May 1604) was the longest mutiny by soldiers of the Army of Flanders during the Eighty Years' War. Frederick Van den Berg's attempt to end the mutiny by force, with a siege to recapture the town, ended in defeat at the hands of an Anglo-Dutch army commanded by Maurice of Nassau. After a period of nearly three years the mutineers were able either to join Maurice's army or rejoin the Spanish army after a pardon had been ratified.

== Background ==
Maurice of Nassau had been actively campaigning against the Habsburg armies in the Southern Netherlands and took full advantage of Archduke Albert of Austria's preoccupation with the Siege of Ostend to capture several towns with royal garrisons in the Northern Netherlands.

Maurice in his first objective successfully besieged and retook Rheinberg in July 1601. Between July and September 1602 the Spanish-held town of Grave was besieged and captured by the Dutch and English army led by Maurice and Francis Vere respectively.

== Mutiny and siege ==
Siege of Hoogstraten
- Part of the Eighty Years' War & the Anglo–Spanish War
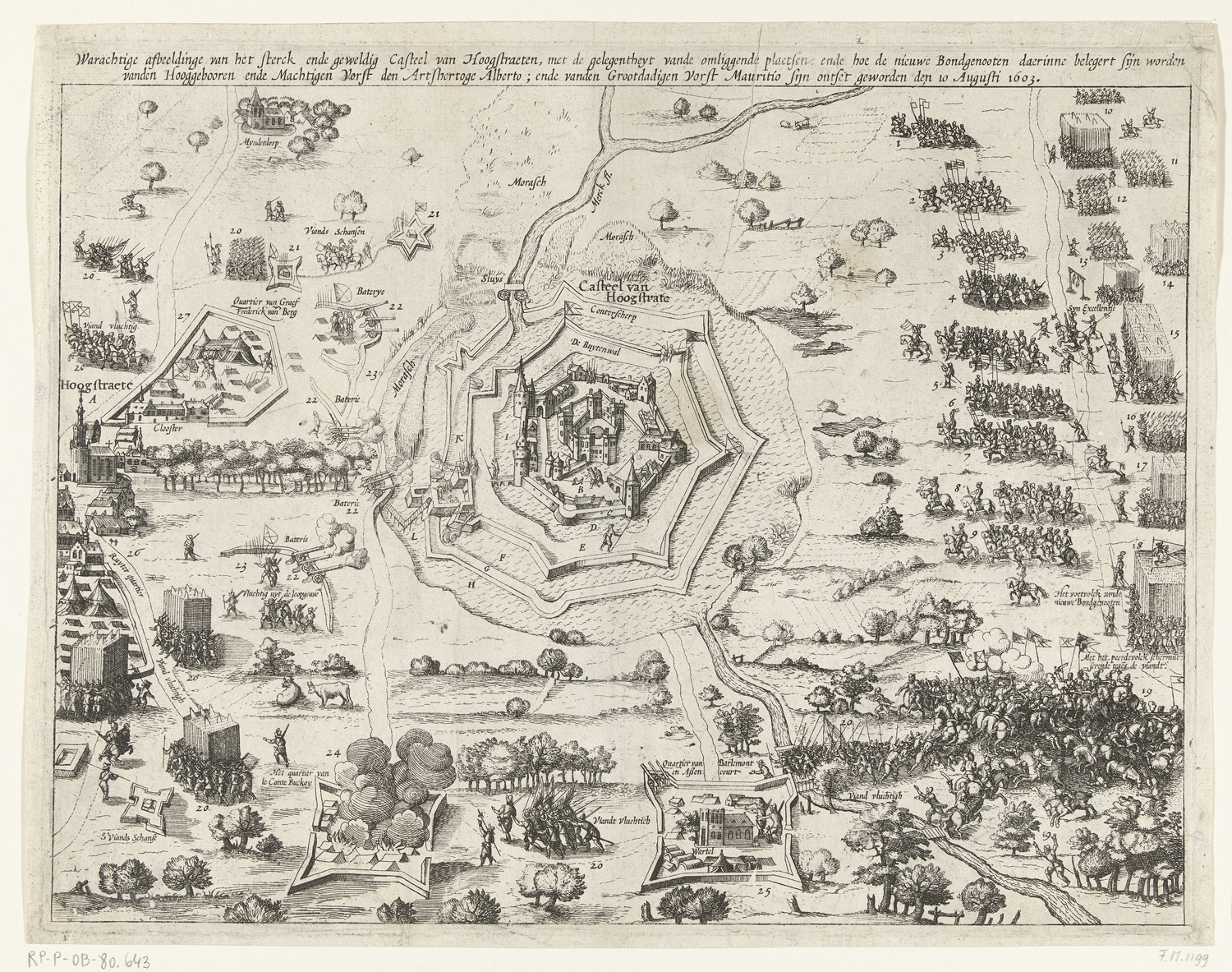
- Relief of the mutineers of Hoogstraten by Maurice's army August 1603
Date	26 July - 10 August 1603
Location	Hoogstraten (present-day Belgium)
Result	Mutineer - allied victory

Belligerents
Dutch Republic; England Spain (mutineers)	Spain

Commanders and leaders
(Dutch Republic) Maurice of Orange	(Spain) Frederick Van den Berg

Strength
14,000 3,000 mutineers	9,800

After the failure to relieve the Spanish garrison at Grave and its subsequent surrender, morale plummeted in the Army of Flanders, some soldiers not having been paid in addition to provisioning being poor. A group of 3,000 disgruntled troops, mostly Italians and Spaniards, mutinied and took and fortified the little town of Hoogstraten. From this secure position, the elected representatives of the mutineers were able to negotiate both with their own command and with the Dutch government.

Count Maurice hoped to use the mutineers to his advantage yet at the same time understood their frustrations. While moving towards the town Maurice soon sighted an army. This was the 10,000 troops under Frederik van den Bergh who had marched from Ostend collecting reinforcements on the way, including many Italians, hoping to recapture the town and shore up its defences. The two armies faced off while Maurice looked for a suitable town in which to garrison the mutineers, with neither side willing to risk losing the advantage.

On August 3 Maurice moved into Hoogstraten much to the delight of the Spanish mutineers who even feted him during his short visit. Here he finally signed an agreement to protect them until they should be reconciled with Albert. Realising Maurice's army had the upper hand and had the mutineers fully on their side, Van den Berg ordered his army to withdraw, also fearing that some of his men would even join them. Three days later the Anglo-Dutch vanguard caught the rear of Van den Berg’s retreating Spanish army.

The mutineers went so far as to create their own state, the Republic of Hoogstraten, with green sashes to distinguish themselves from troops on both sides. Many of the mutineers eventually transferred to Dutch service after they were classed as outlaws by Spanish high command.

When Maurice provided them with a cavalry force they became a bigger threat and it was only then that the Archduke decided to ratify a treaty that granted a complete pardon despite the protests of Spain and the council of state.

== Aftermath ==
When winter came in 1603 all parties retired to winter quarters and Maurice, true to his word, gave the mutineers the town of Grave to garrison.

The mutiny had a severe effect on Spanish military operations, with the Archduke fearing that it might force the abandonment of the Siege of Ostend. During the Siege of Sluis the following year he was incapable of mounting any form of significant offensive to counter Maurice in the field.

An important source for the organisation of the mutiny is the autobiography of Charles Alexandre de Croÿ, Marquis d'Havré, who was a hostage of the mutineers for eleven months.
