= Melun Act of 1851 =

In France, the Melun Act (1850–1851) was one of the first laws regarding Public Health. It was presented by the Viscount André de Melun.

It introduced a range of measures regarding unhealthy and unfit for habitations buildings. The law was actually optional, and was only fully applied in Paris by Baron Haussmann.
