= Marie-Christine de Lalaing =

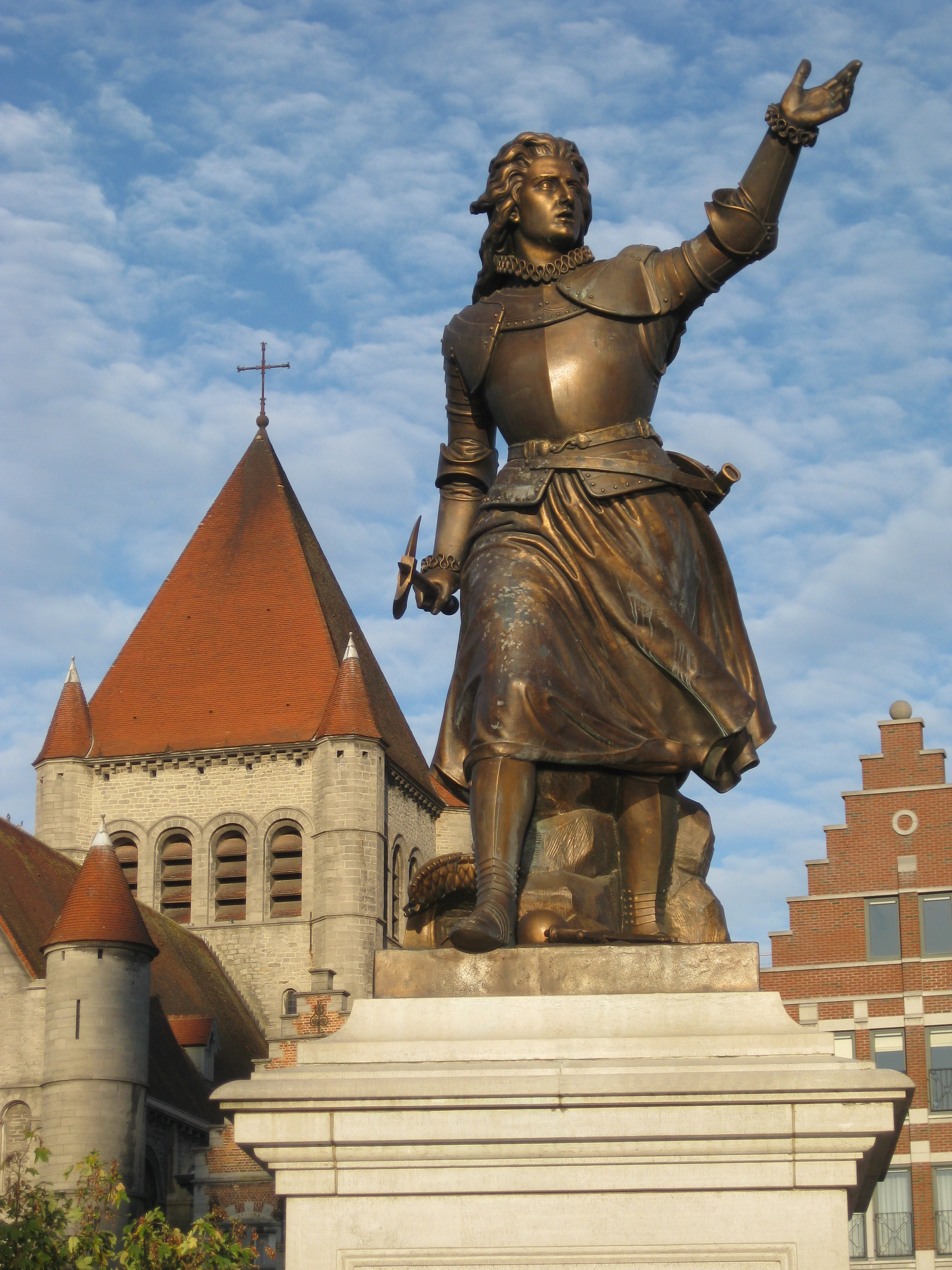
Statue of Christine de Lalaing in Tournai

Marie-Christine de Lalaing, or Philippe-Christine de Lalaing, was the daughter of Count Charles II of Lalaing and Marie de Montmorency-Nivelle. She was married to Pierre de Melun, the governor of Tournai. In the absence of her husband, she defended the city of Tournai against Alexander Farnese, Duke of Parma, in 1581.

== Defense of Tournai ==
In the middle of the 16th Century, Calvinist preachers garnered large support in Tournai, despite the efforts of Philip II of Spain to eradicate the movement. In 1576, the States General of the Netherlands appointed Pierre de Melun as governor of Tournai. Having left Tournai to attack Gravelines, de Melun entrusted the defense of Tournai to his lieutenant and to his wife, Marie-Christine de Lalaing. Shortly after his departure, the Prince of Orange was warned that Farnese would attack the city, despite the coming winter. When the Army of Flanders arrived at the city, Marie-Christine de Lalaing rallied her troops in a speech: "It's me, the wife of your governor who is now marching into war, risking his own life, in service of his country. Follow my example: I would rather give up my life than abandon my country." She was injured in the resistance.
