= Jean de Noircarmes =

- Died: January 1585
- Spouse: Catherine de Tisnacq
- Military career
- Allegiance: Royalist
- Conflicts: Dutch Revolt
- Other work: Diplomat

Jean de Noircarmes (died 1585), lord of Selles, was a royalist soldier and diplomat, loyal to Philip II of Spain, during the Dutch Revolt. His most important mission was to attempt to negotiate a return of the Habsburg Netherlands to loyalty after the Pacification of Ghent, with the only two royal demands being the maintenance of Catholicism and the recognition of Philip II's sovereignty. In December 1577 he was sent from Madrid with royal letters to this effect, arriving in Brussels in January 1578. His negotiations with the States General proved fruitless, but he was able to conclude the Treaty of Arras (1579) with the provinces that had formed the Union of Arras.

In September 1579 his credentials as a royal negotiator were not renewed and he returned to military service. By 20 August 1583 he was a prisoner of war in the hands of forces loyal to Francis, Duke of Anjou. His wife, Catherine de Tisnacq, sought to negotiate his release in a prisoner exchange for François de la Noue, but Noircarmes died in captivity in January 1585.
