= Mathieu Moulart =

Mathieu Moulart (1536–1600), alternatively Moullart or Moulard, was an abbot and bishop in the Habsburg Netherlands.

== Life ==
Moulart was born in the village of Saint-Martin-sur-Cojeul in 1536, the son of the labourers Jean and Antoinette Pronnier. He entered Saint-Ghislain Abbey around 1553 and made his final vows in 1557. In 1559 he was sent to Leuven University where he graduated Licentiate and then Doctor of Sacred Theology. He returned to his monastery on 3 February 1564 and was enthroned as its new abbot on 14 January 1565. As abbot he took steps to identify and punish heretics and sorcerers in Dour.

In 1566, as gangs of iconoclasts were moving through the county, he armed the citizens of Saint-Ghislain to resist them. Warned of these preparations, the image-breakers stayed away from the town. Moulart also founded a school for the citizens' children. He was closely involved in Christopher Plantin's plan to print portable breviaries for Catholic clergy.

As a representative of the clergy in the States of Hainaut, he was deputized to petition the Duke of Alva to modify his plans for unconstitutional innovations, and in 1572 he travelled to Rome and to Madrid to inform Pope Pius V and Philip II of Spain of events in the Low Countries, being absent from his monastery from 22 February to 2 November.

After Robert de Melun, governor of Artois, killed Philippe de Mansfeld in a quarrel, Moulart mediated a reconciliation between Melun and Mansfeld's family. As a member of the First Estate in the States of Hainaut, he took part in the Estates General of 1576 and the negotiation of the Pacification of Ghent.

On 12 October 1576 the cathedral chapter of Arras elected him bishop of Arras in succession to François Richardot, and his appointment was confirmed by the consistory of 4 May 1577. Reluctant to leave his monastery, he was not enthroned as bishop until 1 October 1577, and was not able to reside in his see until 1578, due to the opposition of the supporters of William the Silent. In the meantime, he lived in Amiens. In May 1579 he was one of the signatories of the Treaty of Arras by which the provinces that had formed the Union of Arras recognised royal sovereignty.

On 15 February 1600 he greeted the new joint sovereigns of the Habsburg Netherlands, Albert and Isabella, when they made their solemn entry into Arras, and in the same year he sat in the Estates General of 1600 as the first member of the First Estate for the County of Artois. He died in Brussels on 2 July 1600.

His will, drawn up on 13 January 1596, left a house and his library to found a college at the University of Douai. He had a reputation for generosity to the sick, prisoners, widows and orphans, and to clerical refugees from the Dutch Revolt, but as a fierce opponent of heresy and superstition.
