= Treaty of Arras (1579) =

1579 peace treaty between Spain and Artois, Hainaut, and Walloon Flanders

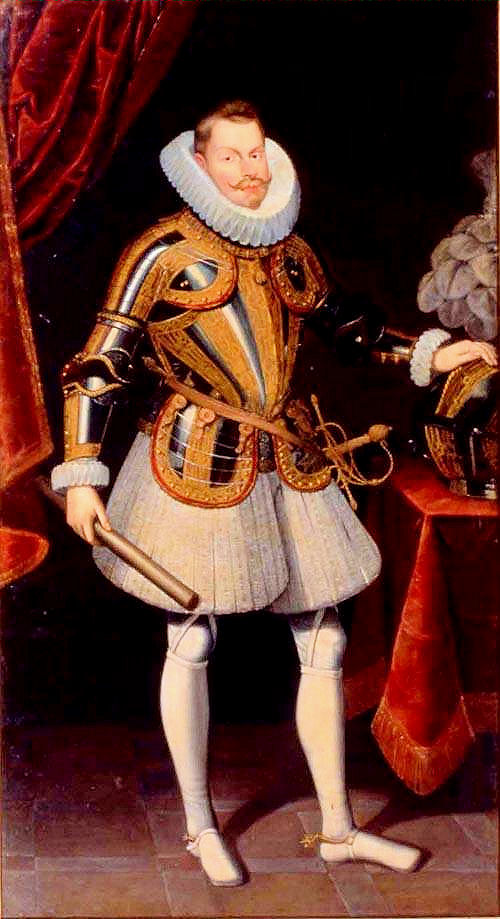
Alexander Farnese, Duke of Parma

The Treaty of Arras of 17 May 1579 was a peace treaty that was concluded between the Spanish Crown, represented by Alexander Farnese, Duke of Parma, and representatives of the County of Hainaut; the County of Artois; and the cities of Douai, Lille, Orchies and Arras, all of which were members of the Union of Arras, which had been formed on the 6 January 1579.

It was a separate peace that formally ended the state of war that had existed between those entities during the Eighty Years' War. The provinces and towns that had formed the Union of Utrecht (23 January 1579) continued the war.

== Background ==
After Don Juan of Austria, the royal governor-general of the Habsburg Netherlands, had broken with the States General of the Netherlands in July 1579 and resumed hostilities, the Union of Brussels initially maintained its common front against the government of King Philip II of Spain. However, after the death of Don Juan in October 1578, his successor, the Duke of Parma, approached a Catholic faction, known later as the "Malcontents", led by the stadtholder of Hainaut, Philip de Lalaing, 3rd Count of Lalaing, and his half-brother Emanuel Philibert de Lalaing (usually referred to as "Montigny") and convinced them to engineer a breach with the Prince of Orange, the leader of the States General, over the latter's policy of "religious peace". That led to the forming of the Union of Arras in January 1579. Its members (beside Hainaut the County of Artois and the cities of Lille, Douay and Orchies) then opened peace negotiations with Parma, which led to the signing of a separate peace.

== Negotiations ==
The representatives of the parties to the Union of Arras had on 8 December 1578 (before the Declaration of 6 January 1579 was sworn to) agreed on a first draft of the treaty. That was followed by a second draft of 9 January 1579 and a third draft of 6 April 1579. Then, on 17 May 1579 the treaty was signed between the representatives of Parma and the members of the Union of Arras. But still the negotiations had not ended and Parma succeeded to wrest a number of further concessions from the treaty partners, which resulted in the version of 12 September 1579, which was ratified by King Philip and promulgated in Mons. It differs on appreciable and important points from the treaty as signed on 17 May. (Note: See for a table of all articles of all drafts and versions of the treaty (in the original French text) Bussemaker, Tweede Deel, pp. 471-497)

== Main provisions of the treaty, as signed on 17 May 1579 ==
- The provisions of the Pacification of Ghent, the Perpetual Edict and the Union of Brussels were reaffirmed by the Spanish Crown and the members of the Union of Arras (art. I)
- Roman Catholicism was to be maintained by all holders of public office (art. II, XI, XII, XV)
- There should be no more garrisons of foreign or mercenary troops, either paid by Spain or by the States General (art. V)
- All prisoners of war would be released (art. IX) (Note: Special mention was made in this article of the eldest son of Orange, Philip William, Prince of Orange as the "Count of Buren" for whom the governor of Lille, Adrien d'Ognies would plead with the king to have him returned to the Netherlands after his abduction to Spain in 1568. But the young man was not released. The provision is not part of art IX of the treaty as ratified by Philip II on 12 September 1579; Cf. Paix d'Arras)
- The Council of State should be organized as in the time of Charles V
- Two thirds of the council members should be installed by all States of the member provinces consenting (art. XVI)
- All privileges that were in force at the time of the reign of Charles V should be reinstated
- Taxes imposed after the reign of Charles V were to be abolished (art. XX)

== Signatories ==
For the Crown

- Mathieu Moulart, bishop of Arras
- Jean de Noircarmes, knight
- Guillaume Le Vasseur, lord of Walhoun

For the States of Artois

- Jacques Froz
- Antoine Germain, abbot of Vicognon
- Nicolas van Landas, knight

For the States of Hainaut

- Lancelot de Persant, lord of La Haye
- Jean d'Ossignies, first alderman of Mons
- Louis Corbant, second alderman of Mons
- Jacques de la Croix, Lord of Callevelle, councillor of Mons
- David de Hanchin, LLD, Pensionary of Mons
- Louis Callier, Clerk of the States and County of Hainaut

For Walloon Flanders (Lille–Douai–Orchies)

- Roland de Vicque, bailiff of Watten, on behalf of the high justiciars
- Jacques de Hennin, bailiff of Comines, on behalf of the high justiciars
- Jean Pitavet, mayor of Lille, on behalf of the city of Lille
- Denis Gilbert, LL.Lic., clerk of Lille, on behalf of the city of Lille
- Pierre Charpentier, abbot of Loos, on behalf of the clergy
- Florent van den Keere, Canon of St Peter's, Lille, on behalf of the clergy
- Eustace d'Oignies, on behalf of the nobility
- Adrien Reblemette, on behalf of the nobility
- Eustace d'Aoust, chief alderman of Douai
- Philippe Broids, LL.Lic., pensionary of Douai

Governors

- Robert de Melun, Marquis of Richebourg, governor of Artois
- Adrien d'Ognies, knight, governor of Walloon Flanders
- Philippe de Lalaing, bailiff of Hainaut

== Sources ==
- Bernard, Jacques, ed. (1700). "Recueil des traitez de paix, de trêve, de neutralité, de suspension d'armes, de confédération, d'alliance, de commerce, de garantie, et d'autres actes publics". Google Books (in French). La Haye. pp. 416–422.
- Bussemaker, C.H.T. (1895). "De afscheiding der Waalsche gewesten van de Generale Unie. Eerste Deel". Google Books (in Dutch). Erven F. Bohn.
- Bussemaker, C.H.T. (1896). "De afscheiding der Waalsche gewesten van de Generale Unie. Tweede Deel". Google Books (in Dutch). Erven F. Bohn.
- Israel, Jonathan (1995). The Dutch Republic: Its Rise, Greatness, and Fall 1477–1806. Oxford: Clarendon Press. ISBN 0-19-873072-1.
- Rowen, Herbert H., ed. (1972). "The Low Countries in Early Modern Times: A Documentary History" (PDF). pp. 261–266.
- "Paix d'Arras". dutchrevolt.leiden.edu (in French).
