= Villers-Saint-Ghislain =

Sub-municipality of the city of Mons, Belgium

Villers-Saint-Ghislain Vilèr-Saint-Guilagne (Picard) Vilé-Sint-Guilin (Walloon)
- Sub-municipality of Mons
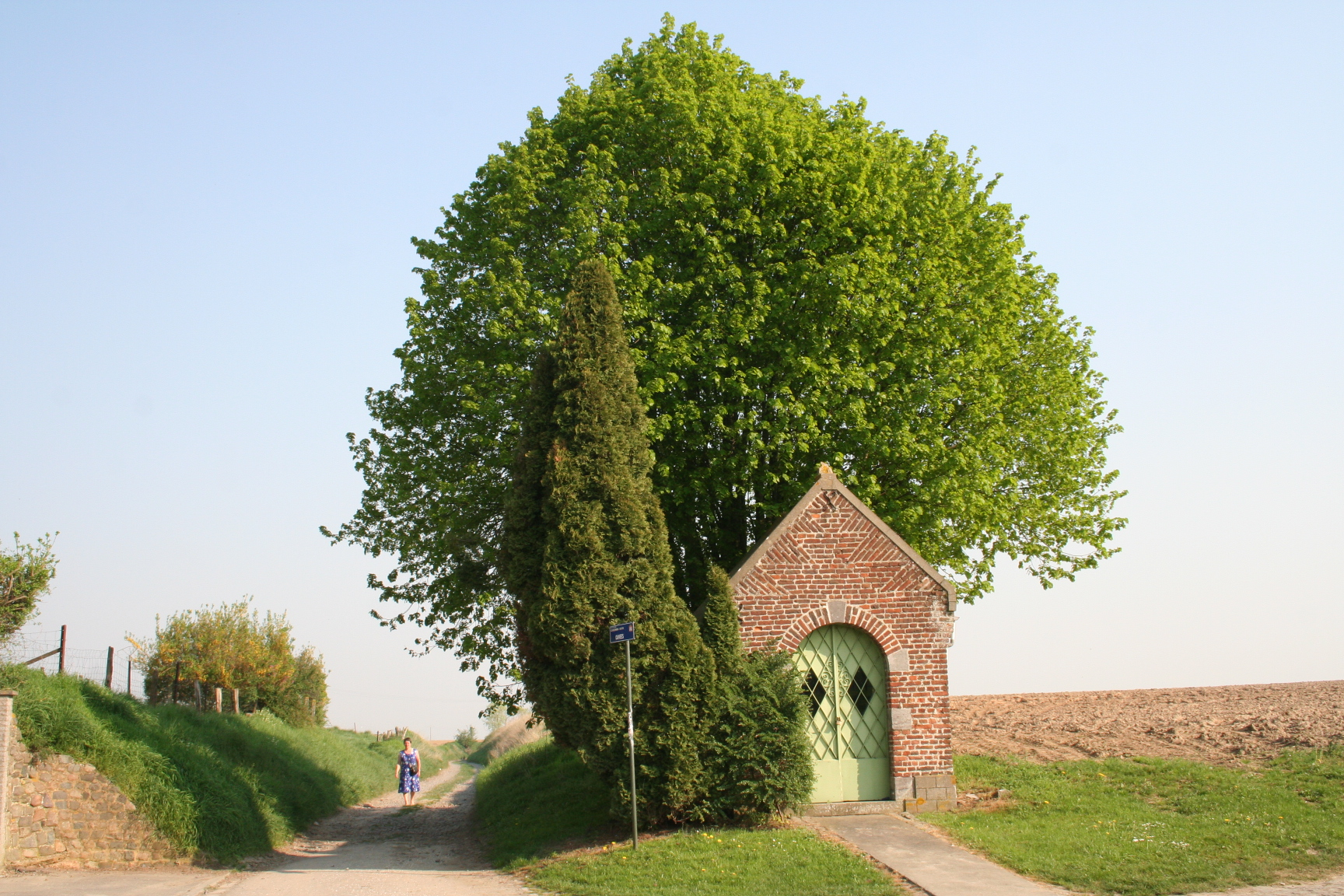

- Coat of arms

- Location of Villers-Saint-Ghislain in Mons
- Interactive map of Villers-Saint-Ghislain
- Location within Belgium Location within Hainaut (Belgium)
- Coordinates: 50°25′52″N 4°02′20″E
- Country: Belgium
- Community: French Community
- Region: Wallonia
- Province: Hainaut
- Arrondissement: Mons
- Municipality: Mons

Area
  - Total: 2.63 km^{2} (1.02 sq mi)

Population (2020-01-01)
  - Total: 655
  - Density: 249/km^{2} (645/sq mi)
- Postal codes: 7031
- Area codes: 065

Villers-Saint-Ghislain (Picard: Vilèr-Saint-Guilagne; Walloon: Vilé-Sint-Guilin) is a sub-municipality of the city of Mons located in the province of Hainaut, Wallonia, Belgium. It was a separate municipality until 1977. On 1 January 1977, it was merged into Mons.

== Gallery ==
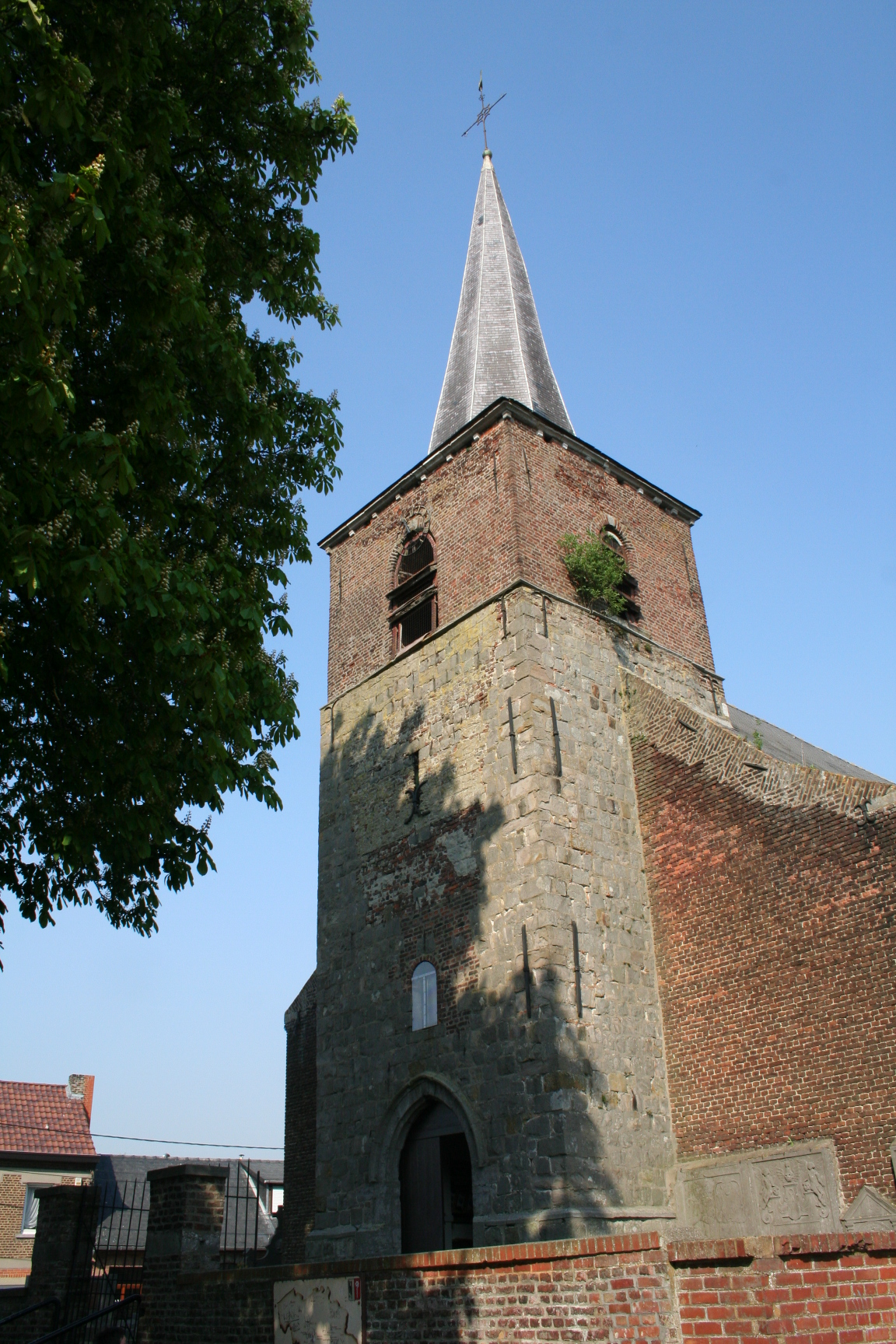
Church Saint-Ghislain.
