= Bandes d'ordonnance =

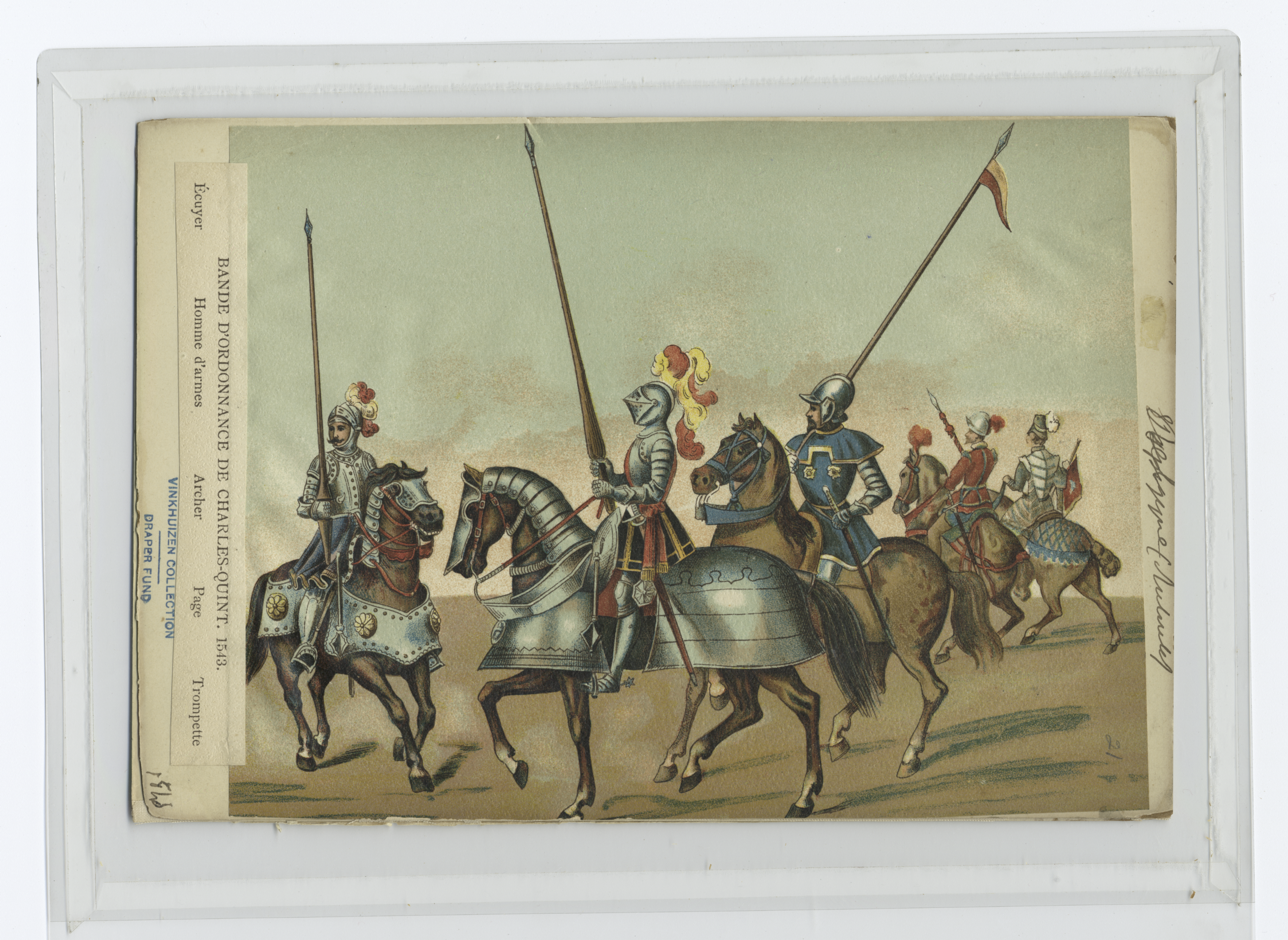
Bande d'ordonnance of around 1543, from the New York Public Library Vinkhuijzen Collection of Military Costume Illustration

Bandes d'ordonnance (French) or Benden van ordonnantie (Dutch) were elite heavy cavalry formations recruited from the aristocracy in the early-modern Low Countries. They were originally formed by Charles the Bold, Duke of Burgundy, and became an integral part of the military organization of the Low Countries from the mid-fifteenth to late-sixteenth centuries, up to the first years of the Eighty Years' War. They continued to exist into the seventeenth century with far less military importance, although a command in a Bande d'ordonnance was still a considerable social distinction.
