= Gilles du Faing =

Gilles du Faing knight
- Born: around 1560; Jamoigne, Duchy of Luxembourg, Habsburg Netherlands
- Died: 11 December 1633; Ghent, County of Flanders, Spanish Netherlands
- Spouse: Marguerite de Steenlant
- Military career
- Allegiance: Habsburg
- Service years: 1584-1588
- Rank: captain
- Conflicts: Siege of Antwerp (1585), Siege of Grave (1586), Siege of Venlo (1586), Siege of Zutphen (1586), Siege of Sluis (1587), Siege of Bergen op Zoom (1588)
- Other work: courtier, councillor, diplomat

Gilles du Faing (c. 1560–1633), lord of Linay and Griffemont, baron of Jamoigne, was a soldier and diplomat in the service of Philip II of Spain and the Archdukes Albert and Isabella.

== Life ==
Du Faing was born to Jean du Faing and Françoise de Cugnon in Jamoigne (now part of Chiny), in the Duchy of Luxembourg, around 1560.

After his studies he became captain of a company in a High German regiment of the Army of Flanders, taking part in the Sieges of Antwerp, Grave, Venlo, Zutphen, Sluis, and Bergen op Zoom. Sent to the royal court in Spain by the Duke of Parma, he remained there for five years on business relating to the Low Countries and the war with France, and in 1595 was knighted by Philip II for his services.

He returned to the Low Countries as a gentleman in the household of the Governor General, Archduke Albert, who in 1596 also appointed him a councillor of the Council of Luxembourg. He wrote an account of Albert's 1598 journey to Spain, and his return with Isabella. In 1600 he was appointed provost of Chiny, and in 1617 high bailiff of the County of Flanders. In 1623 his seigneury of Jamoigne was raised to the status of barony by Philip IV of Spain.

Over the course of his life he undertook 26 official or unofficial diplomatic missions, visiting neighbouring courts in France, Lorraine, Jülich, and Liège, as well as further afield in Germany, Italy and Denmark. In 1600 he was one of the representatives of the Burgundian Circle at a diet in Speyer.

He died in Ghent on 11 December 1633. He was survived by his wife, Marguerite de Steenlant (died 1655), and a son, Philippe-François, baron of Jamoigne, who likewise served on the Council of Luxembourg.
