= Larino Cathedral =

Cathedral in Larino, Molise, Italy

Larino Cathedral Basilica Concattedrale di Santa Maria Assunta e San Pardo
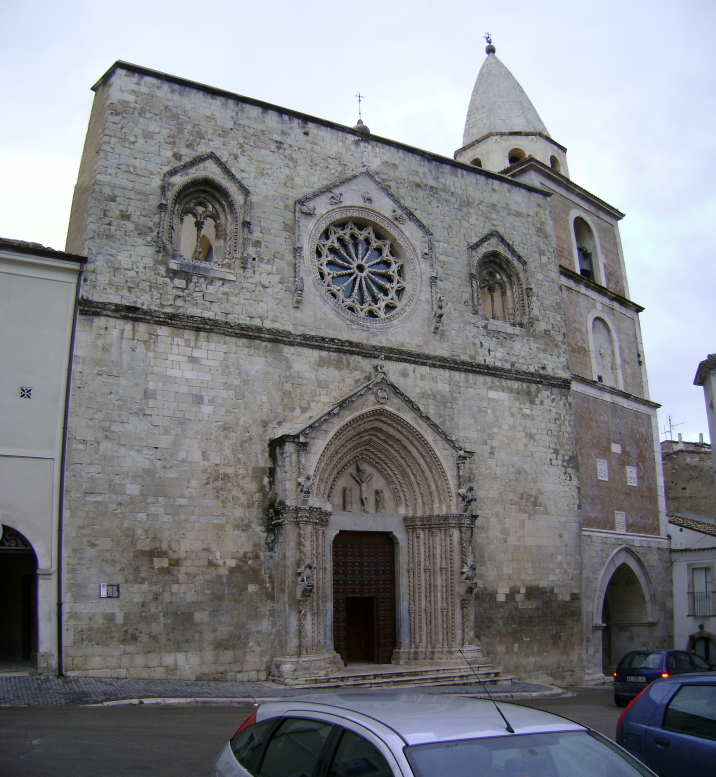

Religion
- Affiliation: Roman Catholic Church
- Province: Termoli-Larino
- Region: Molise
- Rite: Roman Rite
- Ecclesiastical or organisational status: Co-Cathedral
- Year consecrated: 1319, 1729

Location
- Location: Larino
- State: Italy
- Interactive map of Larino Cathedral; Basilica Concattedrale di Santa Maria Assunta e San Pardo
- Coordinates: 41.80094°N 14.91008°E

Architecture
- Type: Church
- Style: Gothic-Romanesque
- Groundbreaking: 13th - 14th century

Larino Cathedral (Italian: Duomo di Larino; Basilica concattedrale di Santa Maria Assunta e San Pardo) is a Roman Catholic cathedral located in Larino in the Province of Campobasso, Molise, Italy. The dedication is to the Assumption of the Virgin Mary and Saint Pardus. Formerly the episcopal seat of the Diocese of Larino, it has been since 1986 a co-cathedral in the Diocese of Termoli-Larino.

In June 1928, Pope Pius XI granted it the status of a minor basilica.

== History ==
The foundation of the church dates to the 13th century. An inscription in the entrance records its consecration on 30 July 1319. The cathedral may have been built on the site of a pre-existing church, but if so, its dates (and existence) are entirely unknown.

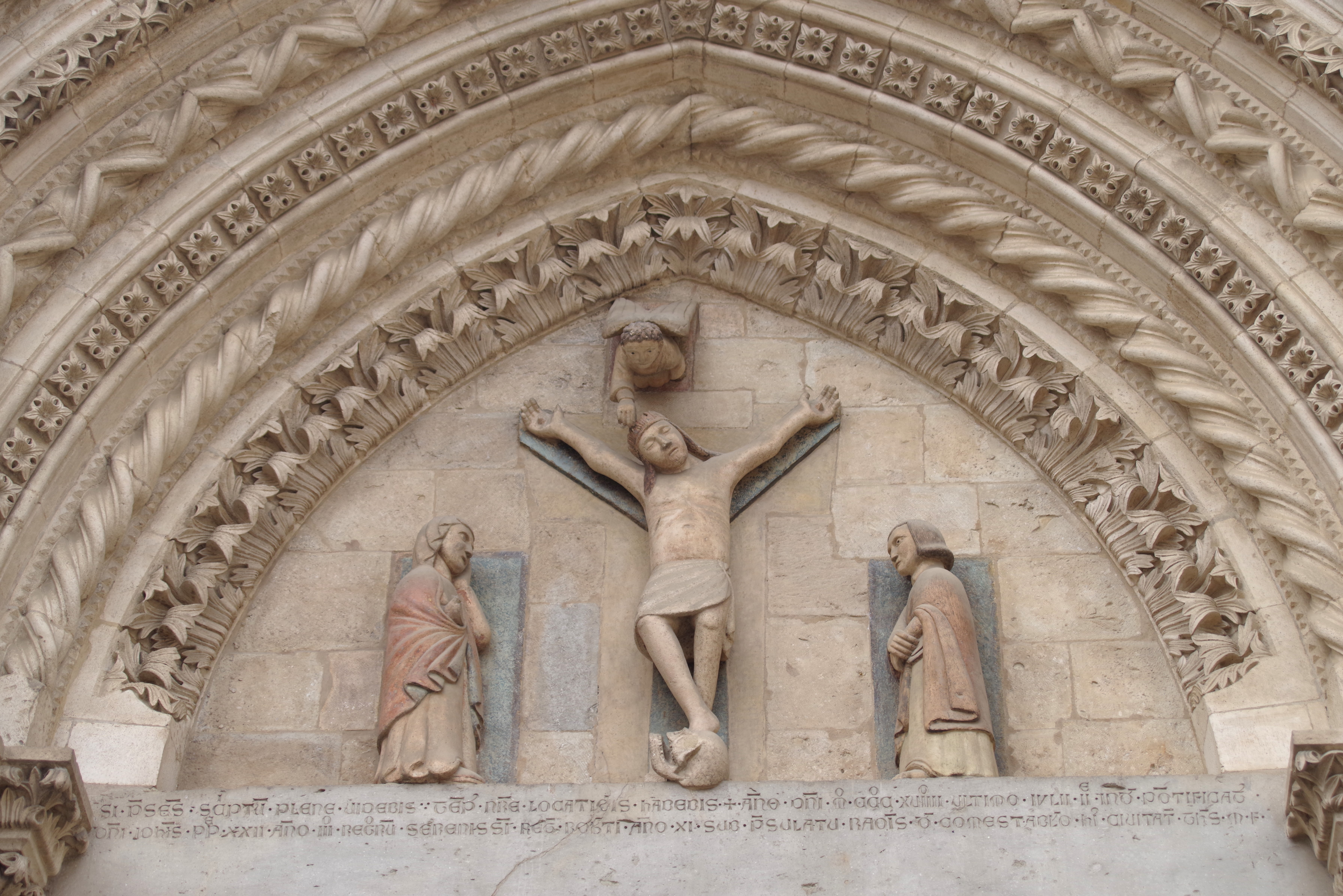
Larino Cathedral, detail of the facade.

The decorative styles and construction techniques indicate that construction continued from the end of the 13th century into the first quarter of the 14th century, with work directed by several successive architects.

In the 14th century, frescos depicting the saints were painted on the pilasters. Paintings were produced to decorate the trussed ceiling. No notable changes were made to the church in the 14th century, except for the installation of the relics of Saint Pardus in an altar in the south aisle. In the 16th century, the campanile was completed. Its basement had been built by Giovanni di Casalbore of Avellino in 1451. In 1537, a fresco of the Annunciation was added to the left of the main entrance. A number of private individuals commissioned works in the cathedral in the same century. Many of these are still extant, including numerous altars.

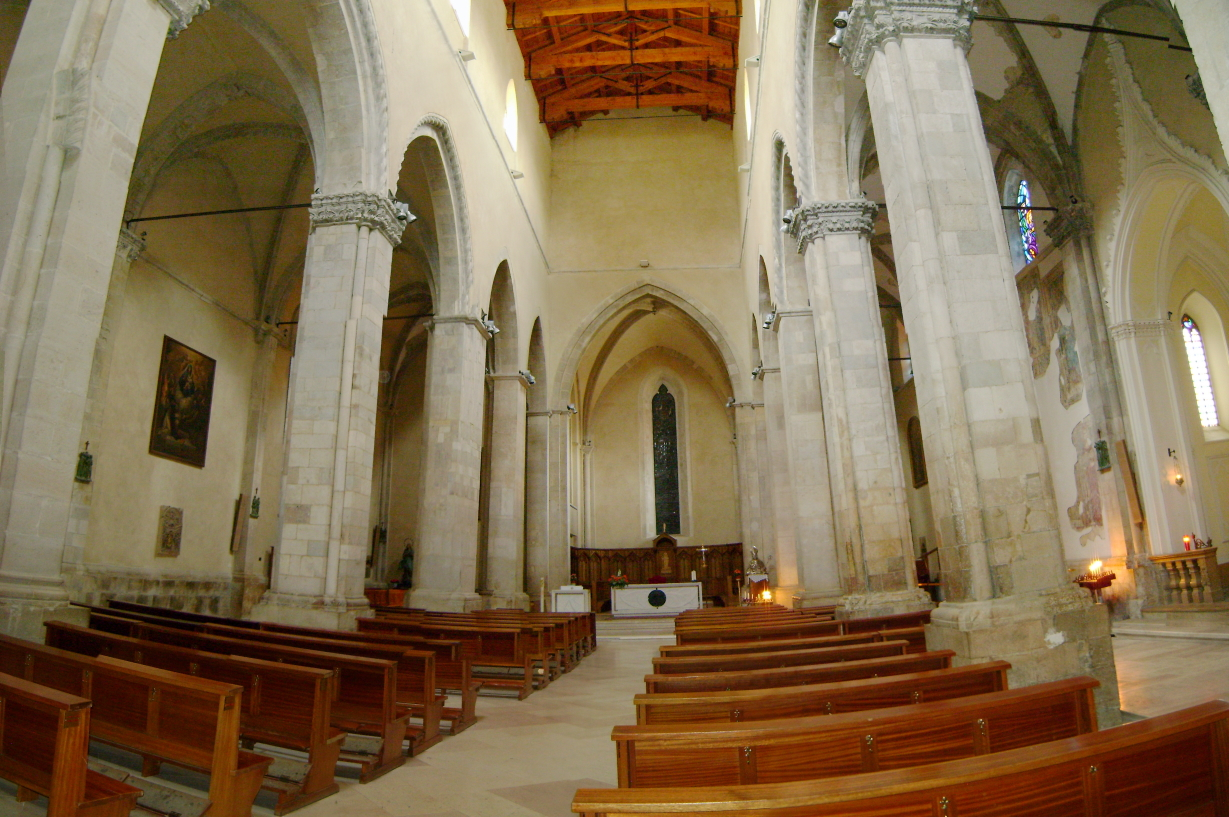
The interior

For the artistic vitality of the basilica, the 17th century was a time of crisis. In 1656, the plague struck the community, leaving many victims. The survivors were reduced to poverty. To restore the economic and religious standing of the city, Mons. Catalani decorated the church with precious objects, including a statue of San Pardo, which has since been stolen.

In the Baroque period, the floor level was raised, two windows were installed flanking the entrance, and the nave of the church was lengthened. Some private altars were removed, since their number was considered excessive.

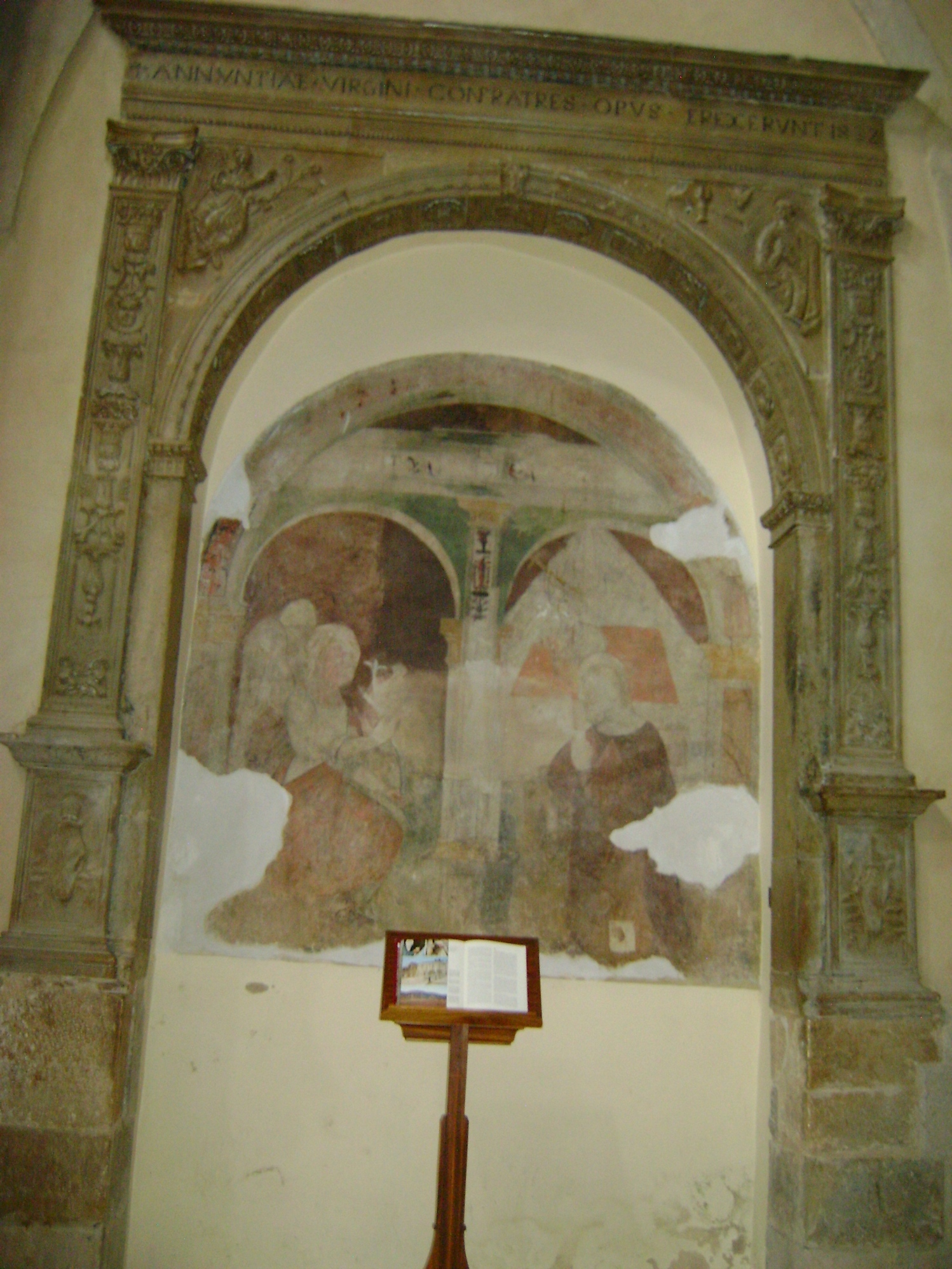
16th-century fresco of the Annunciation

The transformation of the architectural character of the cathedral, from medieval to Baroque, was carried out under Bishop Giovanni Andrea Tria. The trussed ceiling was replaced with coffers and stucco ornaments were added to the Gothic vaults in the nave. He built the chancel, installing a new altar and cathedra in it, both made of polychrome marble by Neapolitan artists. The church was reconsecrated in 1729, while the construction work was still in progress.

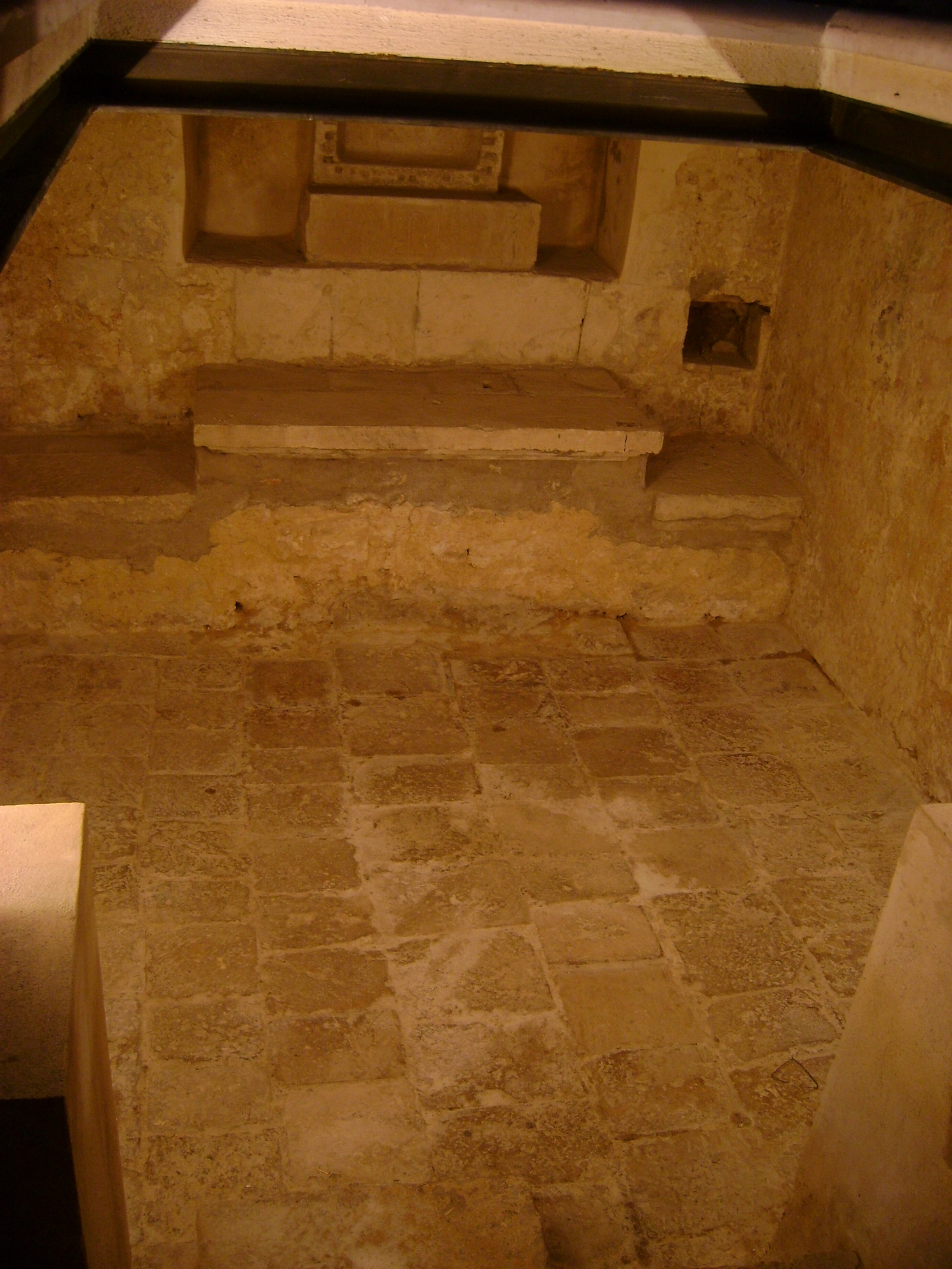
A room under the modern floor level of the basilica

The 19th century was characterised by the rediscovery of the medieval architecture and a renewed appreciation of Romanesque and Gothic architecture. This also occurred in this cathedral, whose original character was rediscovered and praised. The leader of this movement was Bishop Francesco Giampaolo. He gave the windows pointed arches, decorated the coffers with Gothic Revival paintings by Ludovico Palladino and added an arch with Gothic features to the chancel. The arcade and capitals of the central nave were decorated in a 13th-century style. The same bishop made some structural modifications to the basilica, extending the two side aisles towards the chancel and moving the altar back. Later, further changes were made to the furnishings of the chancel.

Restoration work was undertaken to consolidate the structure from 1931, including the campanile, which was destroyed by a lightning strike in 1943.

== Internet Sources ==
*A Virtual Tour of Larino's Cathedral
