= Roger Williams (soldier) =

Welsh mercenary (1539–1595)

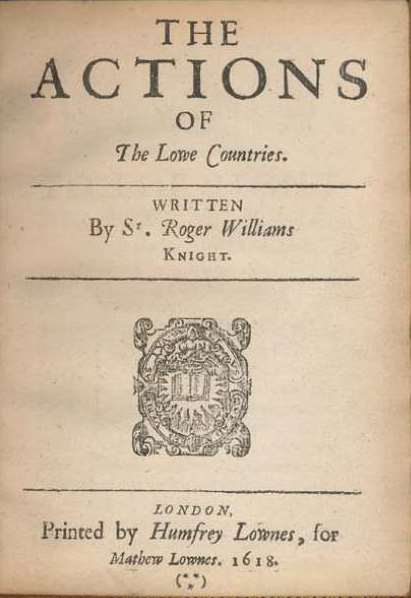
- The title page of Williams' book The Actions of the Lowe Countries.
- Born: c. 1539–1540
- Died: 12 December 1595 (aged 55–56); London, England
- Burial place: St. Paul's Cathedral, London
- Military career
- Allegiance: Dutch Republic; Kingdom of Navarre; Kingdom of England
- Conflicts: Dutch Revolt Eighty Years' War: Battle of Zutphen; War of the Catholic League

Sir Roger Williams (1539/1540 – 12 December 1595) was a Welsh soldier, mercenary and military theorist, who served the Protestant cause, fighting against the Spanish in several theatres of war. Robert Dudley, 1st Earl of Leicester said that as a soldier he was "worth his weight in gold". He was later a close associate of Robert Devereux, 2nd Earl of Essex, and became a national hero because of his exploits fighting the Catholic League. He has been described as "an obstreperous, opinionated Welsh soldier" who was "Essex's devoted confederate and agent".

In his writings on the art of war, Williams was a strong advocate of the modernisation of armies and the exploitation of new military technologies. Some Shakespeare scholars have suggested that he was the basis for the pugnacious Welsh captain Fluellen in William Shakespeare's Henry V, a character who is also both argumentative and unflinchingly loyal.

== Life ==
Born in Penrhos, Monmouthshire, Williams was the son of Thomas Williams and his wife, Eleanor, daughter of Sir William Vaughan. He was said by Anthony Wood to have attended Brasenose College, Oxford. He spent most of his life soldiering, mainly on the continent. In his own writings he says that his first experience of war was as a page under William Herbert, 1st Earl of Pembroke, participating in the storming of St. Quentin in 1557. Williams may have pursued his career in the service of Spain, before becoming associated with its enemies, though Sidney Lee thinks this is "doubtful". He is said to have risen to the rank of Colonel in the Spanish forces.

Whether or not he ever served Spain, in 1572 Williams took part in a raid during the siege of Goes, South Beveland, an outpost of the main Spanish base at Middelburg which was also under siege. The garrison was far larger than they had expected and the attack failed, with many of the raiding party being killed. Williams and Rowland Yorke escaped by crawling out through ditches on their stomachs. In 1577 he joined John Norreys' expedition of English volunteers to the Low Countries, serving as Norreys' military adviser.

In the 1580s he was in the Netherlands fighting on behalf of William the Silent, Prince of Orange, against Spain. He was present when the Prince was assassinated in 1584, and helped capture the assassin, Balthasar Gérard. In 1585 he joined Earl of Leicester's command in the Netherlands, to confront the Spanish forces under the Duke of Parma. Though the campaign was not a success, Leicester wrote: "Roger Williams is worth his weight in gold, for he is noe more valiant than he is wise and of judgement to govern his doings". He was duly knighted after the Battle of Zutphen in 1586 by Leicester.

He also fought for the Protestant Elector of Cologne, Gebhard Truchsess von Waldburg, and fought with the Dutch soldier of fortune, Martin Schenck von Nydeggen in Westphalia. During the Siege of Venlo in 1586 Schenck and Williams came very close to killing the Duke of Parma.

In 1587, Williams and his regiment were in Sluys (Sluis) when the Duke of Parma laid siege to the town. After a heroic defence, the English and Dutch defenders were forced to surrender on 4 August. Parma gave generous terms; the garrison marched out with all their banners and baggage and all the honours of war. Parma sought Williams out and offered him a command where he would not have to fight either his fellow-countrymen or his co-religionists. Williams replied politely that if he ever fought in the service of any other than his queen, Elizabeth, it would be in the service "of that hero of the Protestant cause, King Henry of Navarre."

Williams was in England to assist in the fight against the Spanish Armada in 1588. Williams accompanied Sir Francis Drake in the expedition to Spain and Portugal 1589, and later fought on behalf of the French Huguenots. He met the Earl of Essex in 1589, and the two became close when they were sent by Queen Elizabeth to lead an army as allies of Henry of Navarre against the Catholic League during the Spanish occupation of Brittany in 1592. He went on to serve Henry against the League during the late 1580s and 1590s, scored a major victory at the Battle of Arques. After Essex returned to England Williams became overall commander of the English forces supporting Henry and de facto envoy of the Queen. Shortly afterwards he captured Aumerle with only 600 men. During the Siege of Rouen in 1592, he almost killed Albanian-Italian leader Giorgio Basta in personal combat, slicing his neck and driving him and his men from the field. These actions made Williams a famous hero in England, and pamphlets of his exploits were published. Sir Henry Umton stated that King Henry was full of praise for Williams and his men, "I never heard him give more honour to any service nor to any man than he doth to Sir Roger Williams and the rest".

He returned to England permanently in 1594, but broken in health he died the following year and his death elicited a great show of public mourning. He left his property to the Earl of Essex. He was buried in St Paul's Cathedral with "full military honours" in an expensive funeral funded by the Earl.

== Writings and assessments ==
Williams was recognised as an expert on military matters by his contemporaries, and wrote A Brief Discourse of War, with his opinions concerning some part of Martial Discipline (1590). He also wrote Newes from Sir Roger Williams (1591). After his death his account of his experiences in the Netherlands was published as Actions of the Low Countries in 1618. Williams gave detailed analyses of the different methods and effectiveness of the Dutch and Spanish forces in the Netherlands, commending the discipline of Parma's troops. He also examined methods of creating effective fortifications. Williams was a strong advocate of new weaponry, emphasising that the English army had to adapt to the new technology, as the traditional English longbow would soon be made obsolete by improved firearms. He argued that a combination of fireams and close-quarter deployment of pikes represented the future of warfare.

Williams has been called a "fiery Welshman", who was "rough around the edges, bloody minded, often lacking in self-control and, at times, slightly mad", but he was widely regarded as "a soldier of the highest integrity". Amos Miller considered his A Brief Discourse of War to be one of the most important contributions to military theory of its day. Sidney Lee says that "His letters and literary work prove him to have possessed command of a blunt and forcible vocabulary as well as much sagacity as a student of the art of war."

== Petition anecdote ==
According to an anecdote recorded by the Camden Society, Williams once appeared before the queen with a petition she wished to avoid. When he pressed the matter, she dismissed him with the excuse that his new boots smelled too strongly of tanning.

Sir Roger Williams (who was a Welchman, and but a taylour at the first, though afterwards a very brave souldier) being gracious with Queen Elizabeth, prefer’d a suite to her, which she thought not fit to grant; but he, impatient of a repulse, resolv’d to give another assault; so coming one day to court, makes his address to the Queen, and watching his time, when she was free and pleasaunt, began to move again; she perceived it at the instant, and observing a new pair of boots on his legs, claps her hand to her nose and cryes, "Fah, Williams, I prythee, begone, thy boots stink". "Tut, Tut, madame", says he, “'tis my suite that stinks".

The story includes the implausible assertion that Williams was a tailor before he was a soldier, which may result from a confusion about the pun on "suit[e]", but Lee notes that his family, though members of the gentry, were relatively poor.

== Fluellen ==
The similarity between the character of Williams and Shakespeare's Fluellen (the pedantic Welsh officer obsessed by military "disciplines" in Henry V) was noted by the Victorian military historian Julian S. Corbett, who wrote that Williams, "with his professional pedantry, his quaint and forcible turns of speech, his vanity and cool valour, was another 'Fluellen'.". Likewise, Lee says that "Like Shakespeare's Fluellen, he was constitutionally of a choleric temper and blunt of speech".

Shakespeare scholar J. Dover Wilson made the leap from this to suggest that the character of Fluellen was in fact based on Williams. Wilson insisted that Fluellen was "a careful and unmistakable portrait—a real portrait—of Sir Roger Williams, the Welsh soldier who had accompanied Essex during the French campaign of 1592 and had died, tended by Essex to the last, in 1595." He went on to claim that this was evidence that the play promoted the Earl of Essex's 1599 expedition to Ireland: "That this old friend [of Essex] should reappear in a stage-representation of Agincourt four years later is strong evidence that the play was intended to be associated with the hope of England." Wilson also argued that Williams was the author of the Martin Marprelate tracts.

E. K. Chambers accepted that "Wilson has made a fair case for finding, traits of the Welsh soldier Sir Roger Williams in Fluellen". The connection has been supported by some other commentators. Several critics have noted that, while the characterisation of Fluellen may have been influenced by Williams, there is a major problem with equating the two, because Fluellen is a strong advocate of military tradition, unlike Williams, who was a moderniser. Fluellen's debates with his colleagues appear to parody the war of words between Williams and his critics, but Fluellen supports the position of Williams' main opponent Sir John Smythe.
