= Teodoro Crescia =

Albanian mercenary captain (died 1593)

Teodoro Crescia Teodoro Kresha
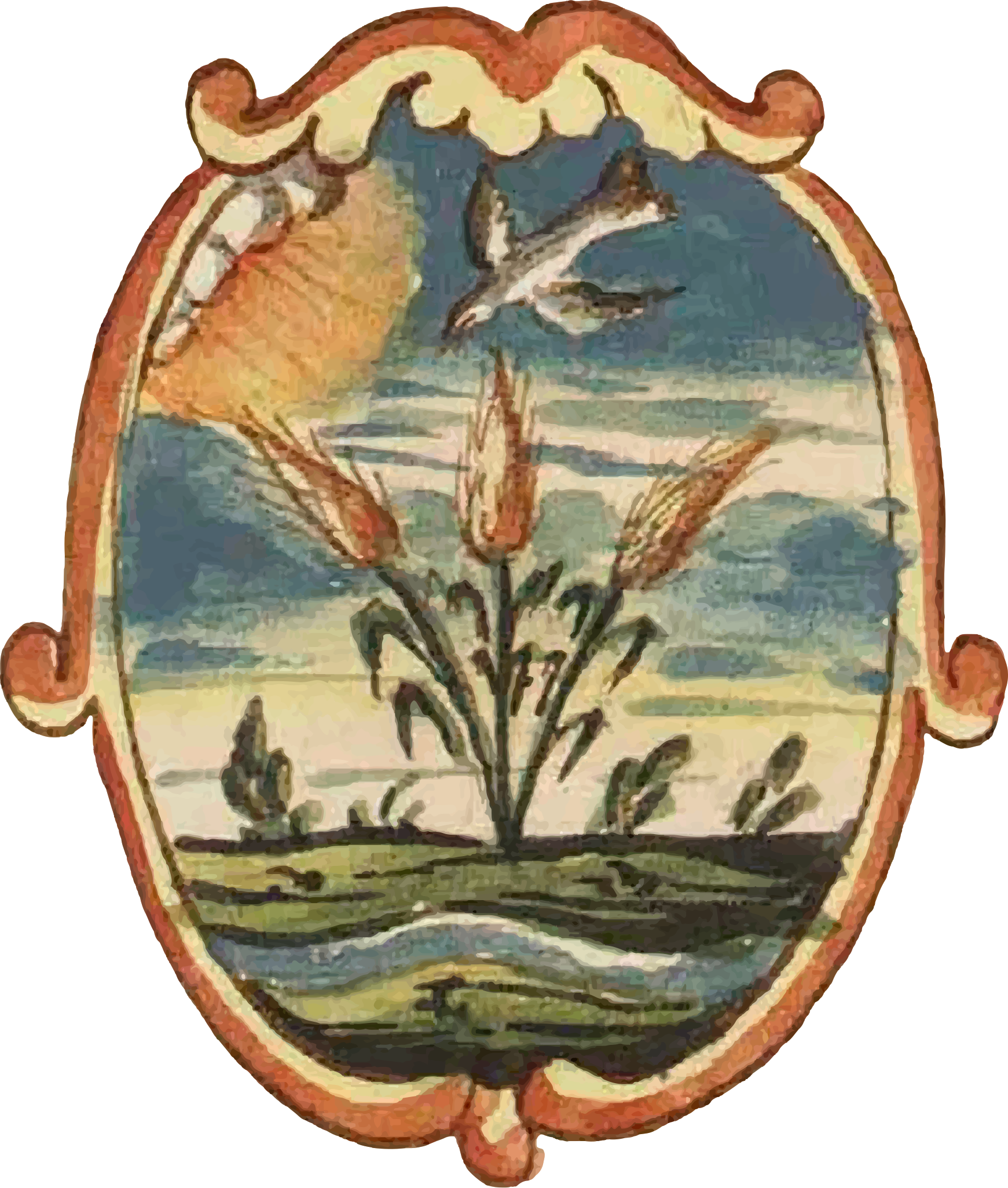
- Coat of arms of the Crescia family
- Died: 1593
- Relatives: Georgio Crescia (Son); Paulo Crescia (Son); Nicola Crescia (Son)
- Military career
- Allegiance: Holy Roman Empire; Kingdom of Naples
- Rank: (stratioti captain)

Teodoro Crescia (Albanian: Teodoro Kresha) (d. 1593) was an Albanian stradioti captain in the Habsburg armies of the Holy Roman Empire and the Crown of Spain (Kingdom of Naples) in the reign of Emperor Charles V and Philip II.

== Military ==
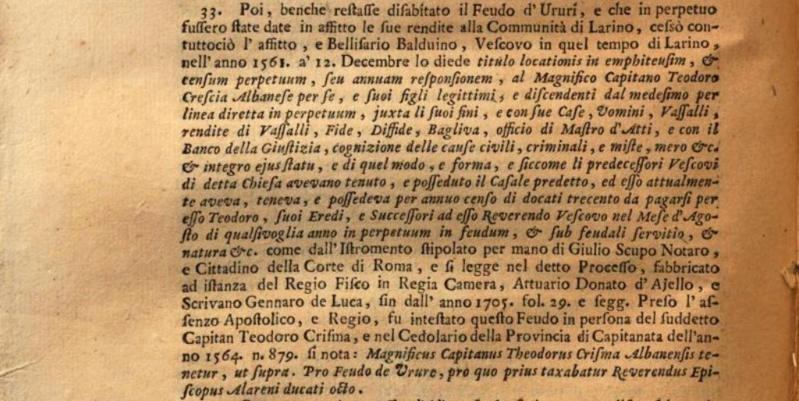
Copy of the contract of feudal rights of magnifico capitano Teodoro Crescia Albanese in Molise

The Crescia family had a long tradition as captains of stradioti units in the Habsburg armies. In 1561, Teodoro Crescia gained for an annual sum of 300 ducats to the bishop of Larino a hereditary feud in the region of Molise. His family preserved the feudal rights until the 18th century. The area was depopulated and many Albanians settled there to repopulate it. The settlement near the feud evolved in the modern Arbëreshë village of Ururi. His sons Giorgio, Paolo and Nicola were stradioti captains. In the reign of Charles V, he fought in Piedmont, Flanders and Germany. In 1567, he was again leading a company of 80 Albanians in Flanders in the campaign of the Duke of Alba. After his return to Italy, the company was commanded by one of his sons. Crescia was for many more years active in the Habsburg armies. Archival material shows that in 1583 he was negotiating for the extension of his final pension to his sons. He died in 1593. The command of his company was passed to two other Albanian captains, his brother-in-law Elia Capoisio and after his death to Michele Papada.

== Bibliography ==
- Passarelli, Pasquale, ed. (1998). Molise; appendice: Testimonianze sui Sanniti. Istituto enciclopedico italiano.
- Floristán, José M. (2019). "Stradioti albanesi al servizio degli Asburgo di Spagna (I): le famiglie albanesi Bua, Crescia e Renesi". Shêjzat – Pleiades (1–2).
