= Siege of Grave =

Siege of Grave may refer to:

- Siege of Grave (1586)
- Siege of Grave (1602)
- Siege of Grave (1674)
