= Siege of Venlo (1586) =

1586 Capture of Venlo

- Part of the Eighty Years' War and the Anglo-Spanish War (1585–1604)
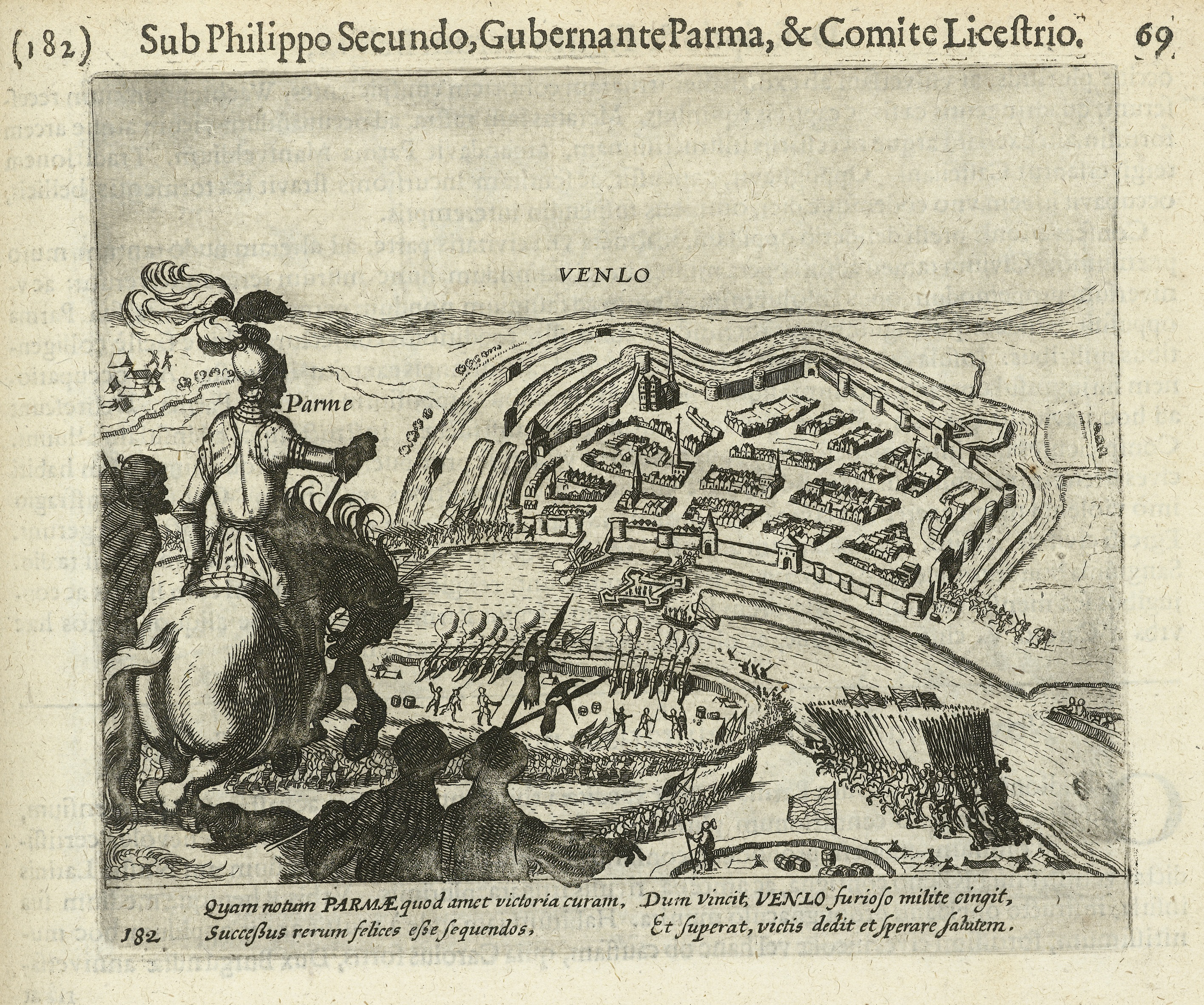
- Engraving Siege of Venlo of 1586 by Simon Frisius. Collection Rijksmuseum Amsterdam.
Date	June 28, 1586
Location	Venlo, Limburg, Low Countries (present-day the Netherlands)
Result	Spanish victory

Belligerents
(Dutch Republic) States-General; England	Spain

Commanders and leaders
(Dutch Republic) Maarten Schenck (Kingdom of England) Roger Williams	(Spain) Alexander Farnese

The siege of Venlo of 1586, also known as the Capture of Venlo, was a Spanish victory that took place on June 28, 1586, at the city of Venlo, in the southeastern of Low Countries, near the German border (present-day Province of Limburg, the Netherlands), between the Spanish forces commanded by Governor-General Don Alexander Farnese, Prince of Parma (Spanish: Alejandro Farnesio), and the Dutch garrison of Venlo, supported by relief troops under Maarten Schenck van Nydeggen and Sir Roger Williams, during the Eighty Years' War and the Anglo-Spanish War (1585–1604). After two failed attempts to relieve the city, the siege ended on June 28, 1586, with the capitulation and the withdrawal of the Dutch garrison.

According to John Lothrop Motley, during the siege, there was an important event when the troops of Maarten Schenck and Roger Williams arrived near Venlo to relieve the Dutch garrison. At that night (about 170 Dutch and English soldiers led by Schenck and Williams) they passed through enemy lines with stealth, killed several Spanish soldiers, and even reached the door of the Prince of Parma's tent, where they killed Parma's secretary and his personal guard. Then, with the Spanish camp alerted, Schenck's troops fled to Wachtendonk, being pursued by 2,000 Spanish soldiers. In this pursuit, nearly half of Maarten Schenck's troops were killed or captured.

After the capture of Venlo, in mid-July 1586, the Spanish army led by Don Alexander, surrounded the city of Neuss (or Nuys), an important Protestant stronghold in the Electorate of Cologne, as part of Spanish support to Ernest of Bavaria in the Cologne War. The city refused to capitulate, and consequently Neuss was virtually destroyed by Parma's army. The whole garrison commanded by Hermann Friedrich Cloedt was killed or captured, including himself.

On May 21, 1597, Maurice of Nassau tried to capture Venlo by surprise, but the operation was a failure due to the great defense of the Spanish garrison, supported by the population of the city. In 1606 another attempt led by Frederick Henry resulted in another failure.

== See also ==
- Siege of Grave (1586)
- Destruction of Neuss
- Siege of Sluis (1587)
- Battle of Zutphen
- List of governors of the Spanish Netherlands
