= Georgio Crescia =

Albanian mercenary captain

Georgio Crescia Gjergj Kresha
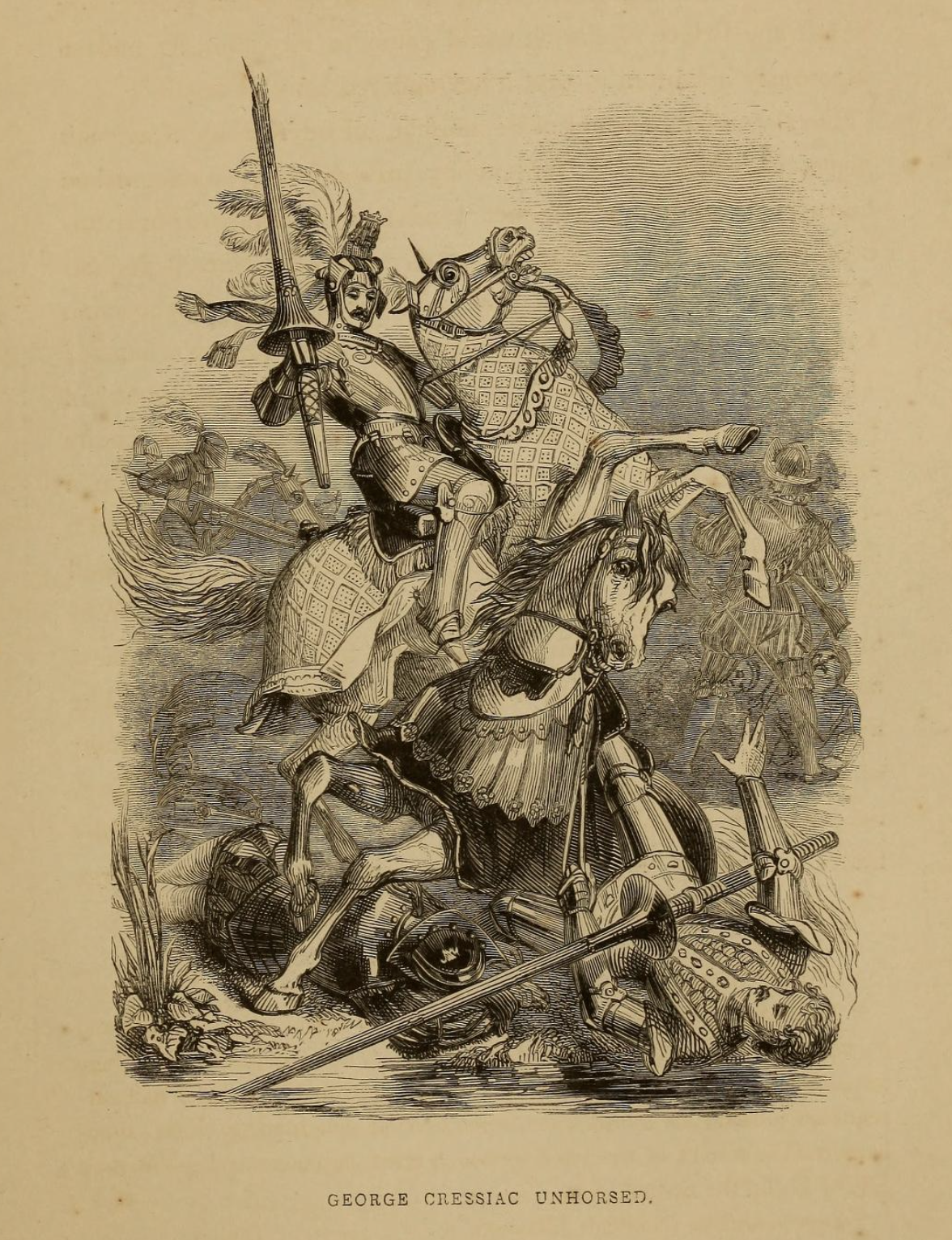
- 1845 depiction of Cresia unhorsed
- Relatives: Teodoro Crescia (father)
- Military career
- Allegiance: Duke of Parma
- Branch: Imperial Army
- Service years: 1580s
- Rank: General
- Nickname: Crescia
- Conflicts: Anglo-Spanish War (1585–1604), Battle of Zutphen

Georgio Crescia (Albanian: Gjergj Kresha; Spanish: Georgio Cressier; Italian: Cressiaco Albano) (fl. 1580s) was an Albanian chief and commander in service of the Duke of Parma of Spain during the Anglo-Spanish War. In September 1586, Peregrine Bertie, the 13th Baron Willoughby de Eresby, under Queen Elizabeth, commanding an English army, captured Crescia after a duel. Crescia then said in French: "I yield myself to you".

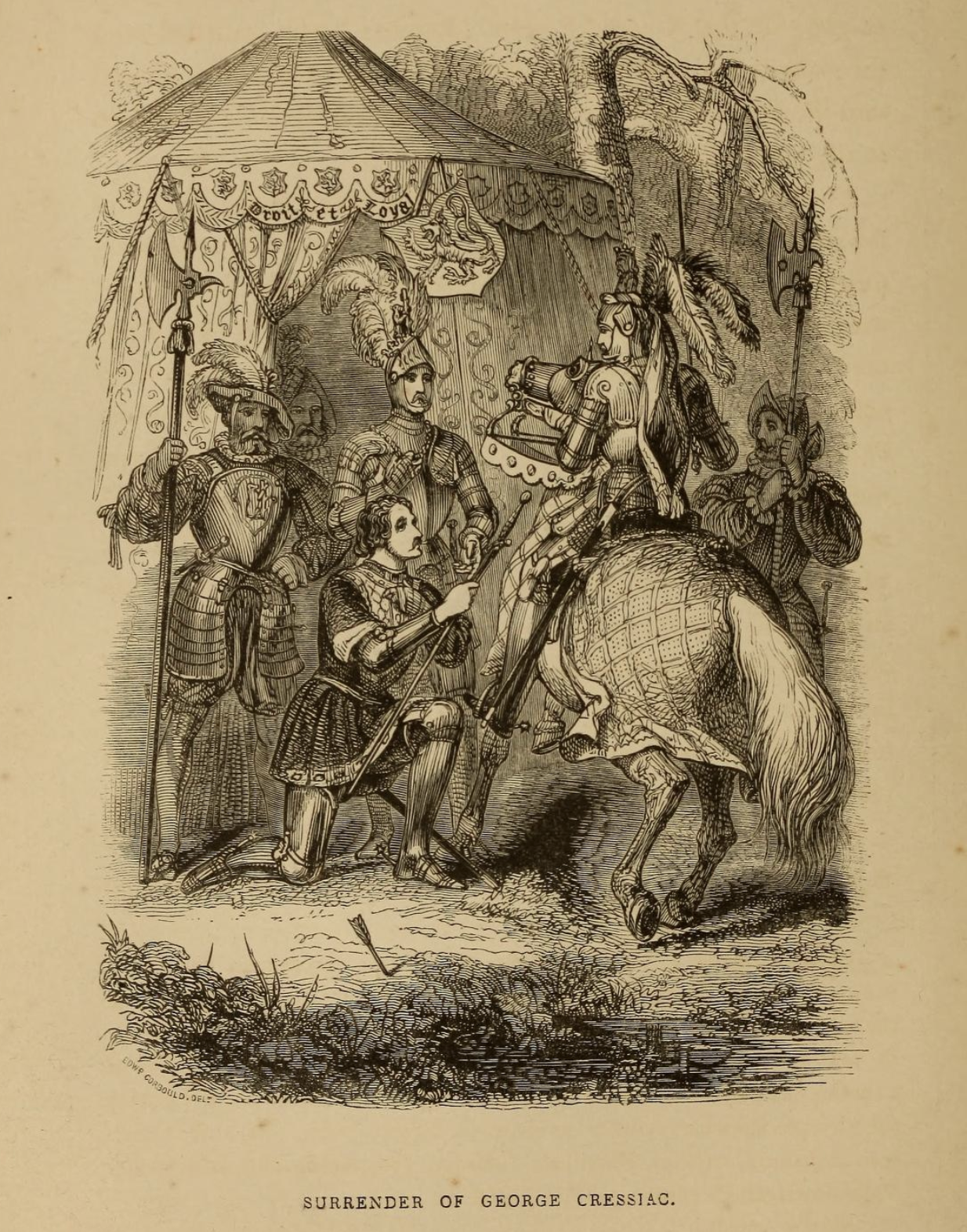
Depiction of Georgio Crescia Surrendering.

== Background ==
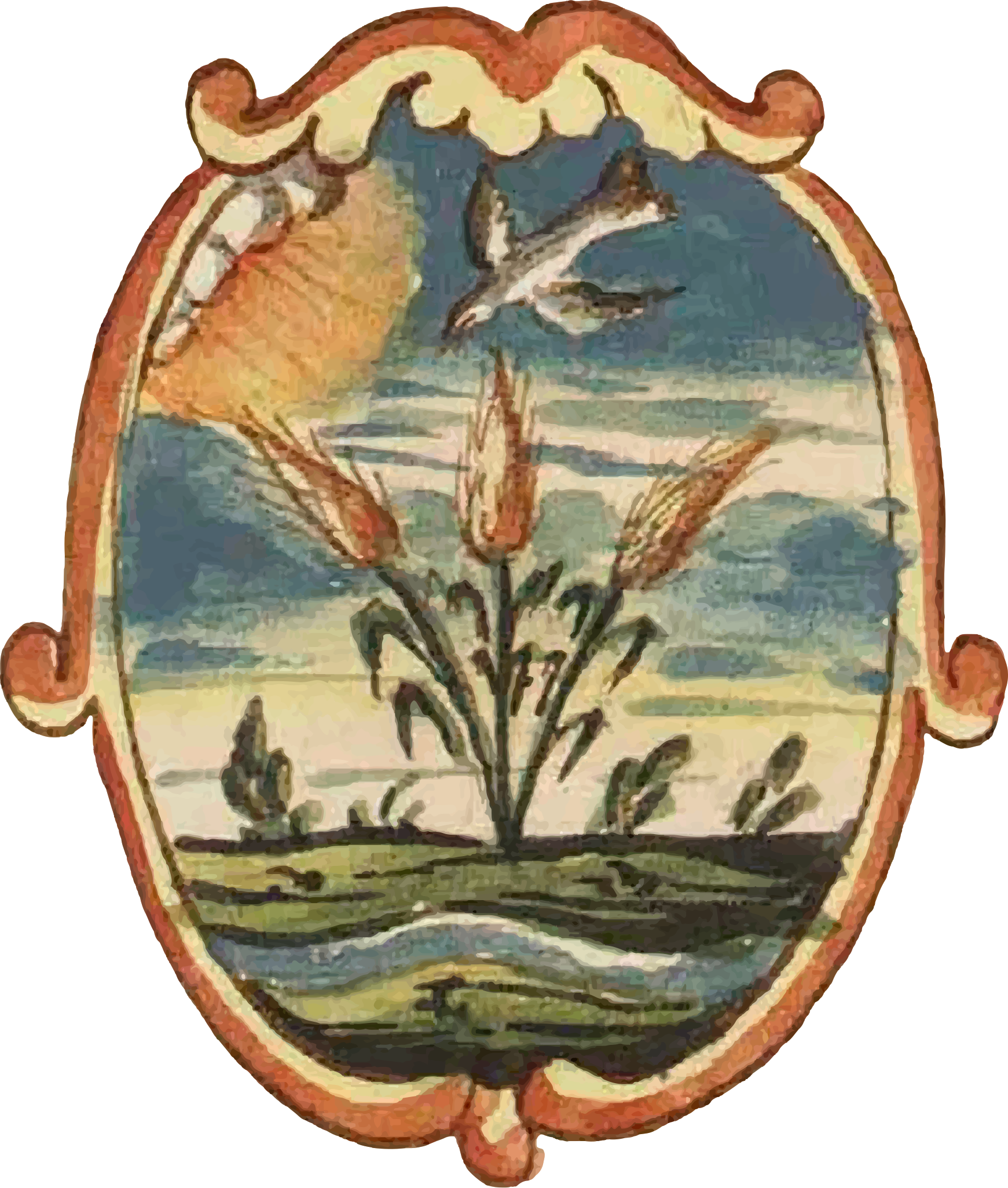
Coat of arms of the Crescia family.

In 1585, Queen Elizabeth sent forces led by Lord Willoughby to aid the Protestant Netherlanders against their Spanish masters. On the 22nd of September 1586, Lord Willoughby distinguished himself in the Battle of Zutphen. A convoy, commanded by George Crescia under the orders of the Duke of Parma, was passing by. Fighting began and Lord Willoughby, alongside Lord Audley, Sir John Norreis, and Sir Philip Sidney, attacked. The Spaniards had the higher ground and charged upon the English who helped their position. Lord Willoughby engaged Georgio Crescia, and defeated him. He fell into a ditch and said: "I yield myself to you, for that you be a seemly knight".
