= Council of Luxembourg =

- Conseil de Luxembourg
- Established: 1444
- Dissolved: 1795
- Jurisdiction: Duchy of Luxembourg
- Location: Luxembourg

The Council of Luxembourg was the central institution in the government of the Duchy of Luxembourg from 1444 to 1795, in direct descent from the medieval council of the dukes. It was a body that had both administrative and judicial authority. The council was reorganized by Charles V in 1531–1532. Until 1782, legal decisions of the council could be appealed to the Great Council of Mechelen. On 1 August 1782 the council was made "sovereign", that is, the highest court in its jurisdiction.

The council was abolished on 7 June 1795.

== Notable members ==
- Gilles du Faing (c. 1560–1633)
