= Battle of Arques =

Battle in the French Wars of Religion

- Part of the French War of Religion (1587–1594) and the Anglo–Spanish War
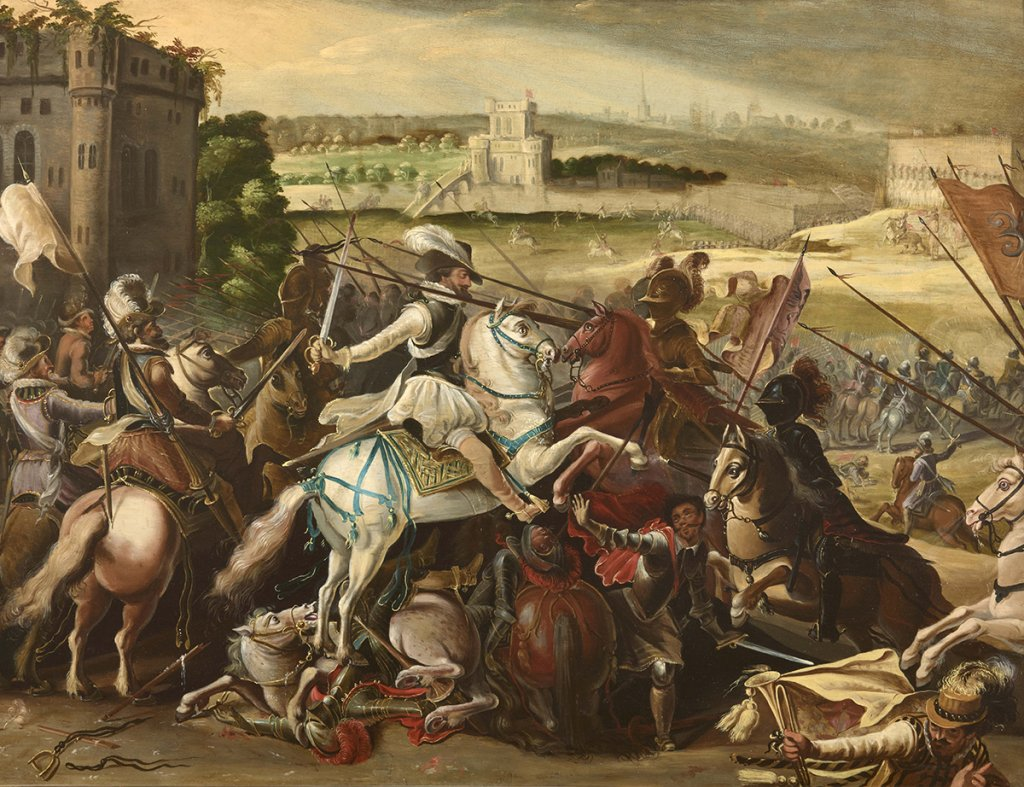
- Henri IV at Arques
Date	15–29 September 1589
Location	Arques-la-Bataille (Seine-Maritime), France 49.882°N 1.127°E
Result	Anglo-French victory

Belligerents
France; England	Catholic League

Commanders and leaders
(Kingdom of France) Henry IV (Kingdom of England) Roger Williams	Charles of Lorraine

Strength
(Kingdom of France) 8,000 men (Kingdom of England) 5,250 men	35,000

Casualties and losses
Heavy	Heavy

The Battle of Arques occurred on 15–29 September 1589 between the French royal forces of King Henry IV of France and troops of the Catholic League commanded by Charles of Lorraine, Duke of Mayenne, during the eighth and final war (1585–1598) of the French Wars of Religion. It was a victory for Henry IV.

== Background ==
At the death of Henry III of France, the Huguenot Henry of Navarre became by birthright the successor to the French throne (as Henry IV). Although he quickly declared his intention to "maintain and preserve the Catholic, apostolic and roman religion" of the country (French: "maintenir et conserver la religion catholique, apostolique et romaine"), the major French cities sided with the Catholic League and its leader, the Charles of Lorraine, Duke of Mayenne (younger brother to the deceased Henry I, Duke of Guise).

At that time, the royal army was in a shambles and Henry IV could only count on barely 20,000 men to conquer a rebellious country. In order to accomplish this task, he divided his troops into three commands: Henri I d'Orléans, Duke of Longueville (1568–1595) for Picardy, Jean VI d'Aumont for Champagne, and Henry IV for Normandy (where he awaited reinforcements from Elizabeth I). On 6 August 1589, Henry set up camp with 8,000 men at the port of Dieppe.

The Duke of Mayenne sought to take back this key strategic port from Henry's forces and to drive him from Normandy. He drew together 35,000 troops, plus Cambrésis militias, Lorraine troops led by the Marquis de Pont-à-Mousson and a contingent of Spanish troops to attack the city.

Knowing that an attack against an army of this size would be pointless, and that staying in the city of Dieppe would be suicidal, Henry (after consulting with the Duke of Longueville and the Duke d'Aumont) decided to go to the city of Arques (today "Arques-la-Bataille") and to construct important military defenses (raising of areas, rebuilding fortifications).

== Battle ==
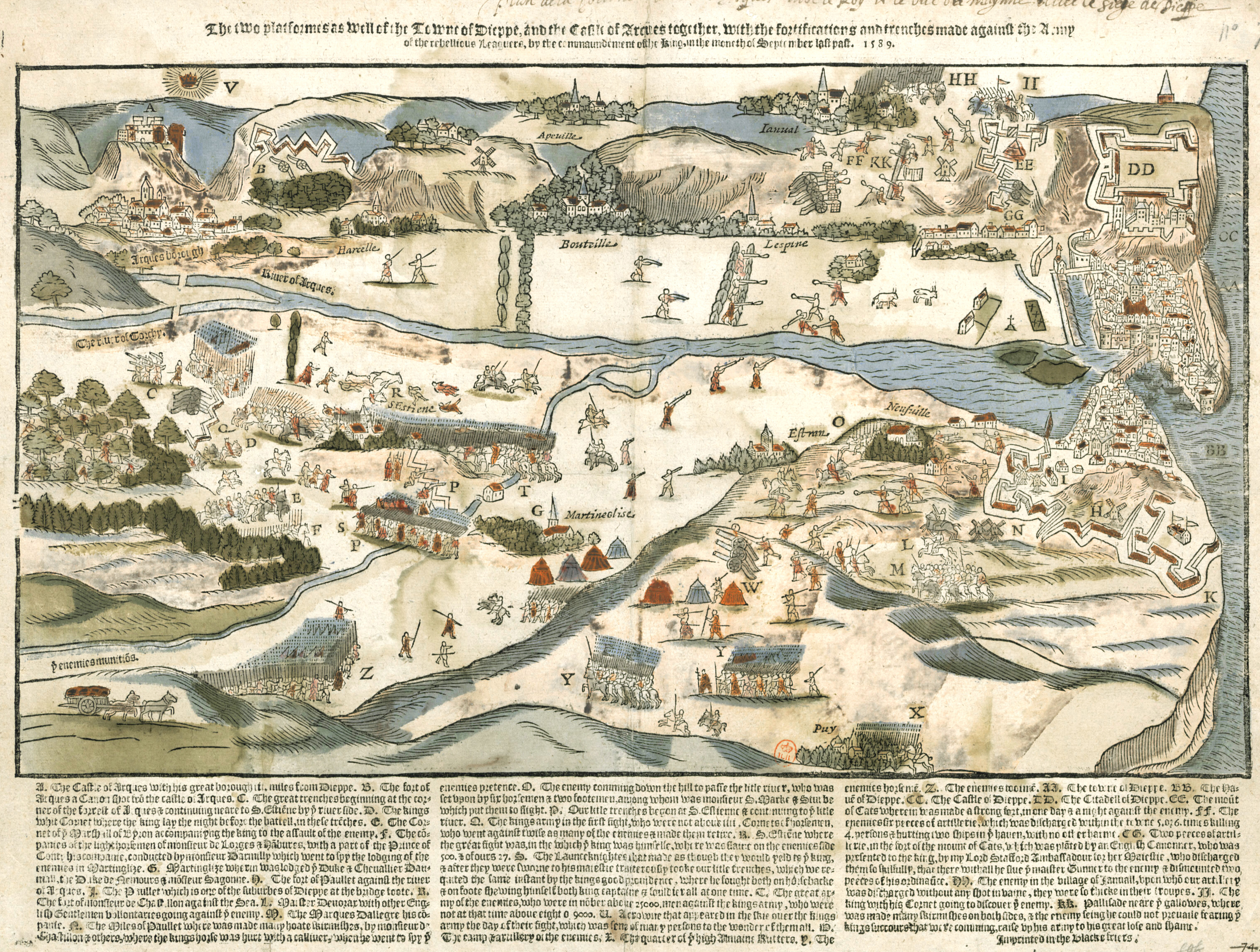
English plan showing manoeuvres between Dieppe and Arques

Between 15 and 29 September 1589, the troops of the Catholic League launched several attacks on Arques and the surrounding areas, but the Duke of Mayenne's forces were countered by royal artillery. The attacks were extremely deadly for both sides, and soon Henry IV's side found itself undermanned.

Henry's rescue came from the sea on 23 September: 4,000 English soldiers under Roger Williams sent by Queen Elizabeth had left England in several waves over three days. Seeing these reinforcements, the Duke of Mayenne decided to retreat, leaving Henry IV victorious.

After the battle of Arques, Henri IV snatched a short rest in a neighbouring chateau, and before riding away he scratched with his diamond the following aspiration on one of the windows: "Dieu garde ma mie. Ce 22 de septembre 1589 - HENRI.

== Bibliography ==
- Jouanna, Arlette and Jacqueline Boucher, Dominique Biloghi, Guy Thiec. Histoire et dictionnaire des Guerres de religion. Collection: Bouquins. Paris: Laffont, 1998. ISBN 2-221-07425-4
- Kinard, Jeff. Artillery: An Illustrated History of Its Impact ABC-Clio, (2007). ISBN 978-1851095568
