= Saint Pardus =

Saint Pardus (Italian: San Pardo; 6th century - 7th century) is a Roman Catholic saint associated with Larino in Italy. Larino Cathedral is dedicated to him.

== Life ==
There is some disagreement about the life of Saint Pardus. He is often described as the first bishop of Larino, but also as a bishop somewhere in the Peloponnese (or possibly Myra) who after being driven from his see took refuge in Rome. There is also some uncertainty in Pardus's chronology: he is usually connected with the 7th century, and the conventional year of his death is 650, but there is a strong tradition linking him to Pope Gregory II (715-731).

After Pardus had sought refuge in Rome, the pope (whether Gregory II or another) offered him many possible bishoprics. Pardus however chose to retire to the region around Lucera in Foggia, where he intended to spend the rest of his life in prayer. This was not a random choice, as Lucera had formed part of the ancient Magna Grecia and many communities of Greek descent were established there.

On his way to Lucera however Pardus spent three years in Larino, the ancient Larinum, where he preached the Gospel. The legend is that he was a little old man with a white beard, and was missing a thumb.

Once in Lucera, he helped build two churches, and then spent his last years in penitence and prayer until his death.

His feast day is 26 May, but in Larino the feast of San Pardo is celebrated over 3 days, 25–27 May.

== Sources ==
- Lanzoni, Francesco (1927). Le diocesi d'Italia dalle origini al principio del secolo VII (an. 604). Faenza: F. Lega. (in Italian), pp. 273-276.

=== External links ===
- Santiebeati.it: San Pardo (in Italian)
- Sito sulla festività del Patrono di Larino (in Italian)
- La Storia di San Pardo (in Italian)
