= Gregorio Compagni =

18th-century Catholic bishop

Most Reverend Gregorio Compagni
- Bishop of Larino
- Church: Catholic Church
- Diocese: Diocese of Larino
- In office: 1703–1705
- Predecessor: Giuseppe Catalini
- Successor: Carlo Maria Pianetti

Orders
- Consecration: 29 January 1696 by Pier Matteo Petrucci

Personal details
- Born: 3 September 1640 Rome, Italy
- Died: 17 September 1705 (age 65) Larino, Italy

Gregorio Compagni, O.P. (1640–1705) was a Roman Catholic prelate who served as Bishop of Larino (1703–1705) and Bishop of Sansepolcro (1696–1705).

== Biography ==
Gregorio Compagni was born in Rome, Italy on 3 September 1640 and ordained a priest in the Order of Preachers. On 2 January 1696, he was appointed Bishop of Borgo San Sepolcro by Pope Innocent XII. On 29 January 1696, he was consecrated bishop by Pier Matteo Petrucci, Cardinal-Priest of San Marcello, with Prospero Bottini, Titular Archbishop of Myra, and Giovanni Battista Visconti Aicardi, Bishop of Novara, serving as co-consecrators. On 25 June 1703, he was transferred by Pope Clement XI to the diocese of Larino. He served as Bishop of Larino until his death on 17 September 1705.

Catholic Church titles
Preceded by Lodovico Malaspina	Bishop of Sansepolcro; 1696–1705	Succeeded by Giovanni Lorenzo Tilli
Preceded by Giuseppe Catalini	Bishop of Larino; 1703–1705	Succeeded by Carlo Maria Pianetti
