= William Stanley (born 1548) =

English nobleman and officer

Sir William Stanley (1548 – 3 March 1630), son of Sir Rowland Stanley of Hooton (died 1612) and Margaret Aldersy, was a member of the Stanley family, Earls of Derby. He was an officer and a recusant, who served under Elizabeth I of England and is most noted for his surrender of Deventer to the Spanish in 1587.

== Early career ==
Stanley was educated with Dr. Standish at Lathom and was brought up in the Catholic faith. After school, he entered the service of his kinsman, Edward Stanley, 3rd Earl of Derby (c.1508–1572), and then served in the Netherlands as a volunteer under the Duke of Alba from 1567 to 1570. In 1570 he was sent on service to Ireland.

== Ireland ==
On the outbreak of the Second Desmond Rebellion in 1579, Stanley was promoted to captain under Sir William Drury, lord justice of Ireland, who knighted him at Waterford for his service in penetrating Limerick in pursuit of the followers of Gerald FitzGerald, 14th Earl of Desmond. He fought in the battle of Monasternenagh and defended the town of Adare. In 1580, he enlisted troops in England and led them to the rebellious province of Munster; but the new lord deputy, Lord Grey, quickly recalled him to the Pale to help put down the rebellion that had broken out in the vicinity of Dublin.

In 1581, he campaigned against the clans of Kavanagh and O'Toole, and on 30 August 1581 was commissioned to follow the lord deputy in the government's campaign against Fiach McHugh O'Byrne, a rebel leader whose fastness lay in the Wicklow mountains. During that campaign, he was engaged at the Battle of Glenmalure in charge of the rear guard, and covered the retreat of Grey's forces after they had been routed from the glens. At the end of the year, his troops were discharged, and he went to England to seek further employment from the queen's principal secretary, Lord Burghley.

At the beginning of 1583, Stanley was sent back to Ireland to deal with the rebel Geraldines of Desmond, and was appointed by the Earl of Ormond as commander of the garrison at Lismore; he was also Constable of Castle Maine, which he intended to "make a town of English", and granted the lands of the former Killagha Abbey. During this tour of duty he assisted in the pursuit of the earl of Desmond and James Fitzedmund Fitzgerald, the seneschal of Imokilly, and in the final subjugation of Munster at the end of the rebellion.

The defeat of the rebels presented many opportunities for advancement to the New English, those adventurers and administrators who had taken advantage of crown policy in Ireland to establish fortunes for themselves outside of their restricted circumstances at home. Stanley became ambitious and sought the presidency of the province of Connacht by petitioning Sir Francis Walsingham and Burghley, but this was denied. Instead, he was made sheriff of Cork in August 1583, and then assumed the government of Munster in the absence of Sir John Norris. He boasted of having hanged 300 rebels and of leaving the rest so terrified that, "a man might now travel the whole country and none molest him".

At the end of 1584, the new lord deputy, Sir John Perrot, sent Stanley north in the company of Sir Henry Bagenal to act against the Ulster chieftains and the Scots led by Sorley Boy MacDonnell. During this campaign, he received severe wounds and was laid up for several months. He had marched with two companies to Ballycastle to join up with a troop of cavalry stationed in Bunamargey Abbey (the burial place of the MacDonnells), after Bagenal was forced to take refuge in Carrickfergus. On 1 January 1585, the enemy took him completely by surprise in camp beside the abbey, when half a dozen horsemen at the head of the Scots foot set the thatched roof of the church on fire. Stanley was forced to fight in his shirt, having had no time to don armour, and was wounded in the thigh, the arm and side, and in the back (he claimed he had turned to his men to urge them on). Some of the horse were burned in the abbey, and the enemy fell away without pursuit, and soon after twenty-four oared galleys of the Scots rowed across Ballycastle Bay while Stanley's ships remained at anchor in flat calm conditions. Although he subsequently almost defeated Sorley Boy's nephew, reinforcements arrived from Scotland and there was little more to be achieved. Stanley returned to England in October, where his service in Ireland was considered to have been brilliant.

== Leicester's expedition ==
At the start of the Anglo-Spanish War, Stanley accompanied Robert Dudley, 1st Earl of Leicester in the 1585 expedition to the Netherlands, and was then sent to Ireland for the recruitment of troops. He expressed his enthusiasm for Irish soldiers, considering those who had fought under the Geraldine John of Desmond as resolute as any in Europe; in 1579 he had commented that the only difference between English and Irish soldiers lay in the superior discipline of the former.

Having raised 1,400 troops – most of them Irish – Stanley set out for the continent. En route he stayed in London, where it was reported that he had been in the confidence of Jesuits and privy to part of the Babington Plot, and that he had corresponded with the Spanish ambassador, Mendoza, and with the Tower-bound Earl of Arundel. When ordered to carry on to the Netherlands, he tarried in England, supposedly in the expectation of an attempt on Elizabeth's life or the arrival of a Spanish fleet. Eventually, he was obliged to sail, but anticipated joining with the Duke of Parma.

In August 1586, Stanley joined Leicester and, with John Norris, took Doesborg in a violent assault. Following his service at Zutphen, where Sir Philip Sidney was fatally wounded, Leicester deemed him "worth his weight in pearl"; in October, with Sir William Pelham he took Deventer, where he was appointed governor of the city in command of a garrison of his own – mostly Irish – troops, numbering 1,200.

The quarrel between Leicester and Norris resulted in a commission for Stanley to act independently of the latter, who had taken over command of the English forces on Leicester's departure, an arrangement that prompted dissent from the States General of the Netherlands. Stanley promptly communicated with the Spanish governor of Zutphen, and Deventer was surrendered by him to the Spanish in January 1587, whereupon he and 600 of his men entered the service of King Philip II. 300 remained loyal to Elizabeth. This occurred the day after the fort of Zutphen had similarly been betrayed by the English commander Rowland York (28 January).

Cardinal William Allen published a letter at Antwerp justifying Stanley's actions and setting out the case for the assassination of Elizabeth I as an act of tyrannicide, citing Pope Pius V's 1570 papal bull Regnans in Excelsis. At the time, the queen had been considering Stanley for honours and titles, including his appointment as viceroy of Ireland; but he was almost certainly in complete sympathy with the Jesuits, which order his brother had joined and whose members sang his praises. Thereafter he plotted an invasion of England – the troops to disembark at Milford-Haven and in Ireland, where bases for the larger operation might be established – but he was disappointed at the countenance he received from the Spanish authorities, although they did award him a crown pension, in the 1580s amounting to 300 escudos per month (the arrears of which he had to pursue in later years).

== Later career ==
In 1588, the year of the Spanish Armada, Stanley was at the head of 700 men in the Netherlands, ready to embark with the invasion fleet. After the failure of the Armada, Sir William Fitzwilliam, lord deputy of Ireland, speculated that Stanley might be chosen to lead the Spanish army in any further attempt to invade England. In any event, he maintained his regiment in the Netherlands while travelling often to Spain to urge action against Elizabeth. Stanley drew up plans for the conquest of Alderney in the late 1580s, but these too were cast aside by the Duke of Parma. Philip II remained obstinate in his refusal to deploy the English regiment outside the Low Countries.

In the early 1590s, he fostered numerous attempts to assassinate the Queen, but all of them were poorly planned and easily detected. Patrick O'Collun, an Irish fencing master, and his accomplice John Annias, who had both served under Stanley, were executed at Tyburn in 1594 for having agreed at Stanley's instigation to murder the Queen, as were Richard Williams and Edmund York the following year. Stanley is said to have been greatly under the influence of his former army lieutenant Jacques de Francisco (Captain Jacques), a somewhat shadowy individual, and the Jesuit William Holt, both of whom believed sincerely that the killing of Elizabeth would be a meritorious act.

By 1595 Stanley was desperate and suffered a reproof from the Spanish governor of the Netherlands for his violent language against Elizabeth. In December 1596 he helped deliver a renegade Scottish courtier John Wemyss of Logie to the Count of Fuentes. He continued in military service for the Spanish and was opposed to King James I on his accession in 1603, but he soon sued for a pardon and seemed desirous of returning to England. Sir Robert Cecil exonerated him from complicity in the Gunpowder Plot, but he never gained permission to visit England and spent the rest of his life in relative obscurity. He maintained a close association with the Jesuits, and when he had fallen out with them, with the English Carthusians.

Stanley died at Ghent on 3 March 1630, aged eighty years old.

== Legacy ==
In 1560, he married Anne Dutton, a bride of ten, but the marriage was dissolved in 1565. His second marriage was to Elizabeth Egerton (d. 1614), sister of Sir John Egerton ("black Sir John"), who married William's sister Margaret. He had two sons and three daughters; one of his sons, James Stanley, was an associate of the Earl of Arundel in the 17th century, as they plotted to overthrow the Jamestown Colony.
