= Giovanni Andrea Tria =

Italian bishop, diplomat and historian (1676–1761)

Giovanni Andrea Tria (22 July 1676 – 16 January 1761), was an Italian bishop, diplomat and historian.

== Life ==
He was born in Laterza to Francesco Tria and Margherita Geminale. He completed his studies in Philosophy, Theology, and Civil and Ecclesiastical Law at Naples and Rome.

In 1704, he was an "auditor" of ecclesiastical law at the Benedictine Monastery of Cava and he remained in the service of this Abbey even when he was transferred to Rome. On 26 August 1709 he was nominated Vicar General to Monsignor Lorenzo Gherardi, the Bishop of Loreto e Recanati, and he continued in this position until 1714. Later he served with Monsignor Giuseppe Firrao, the "Nunzio Straordinario" to the Court of Portugal. When Monsignor Firrao, for reasons of health, was reassigned to Switzerland, Tria traveled with him to Lucerne. During Tria's stay in Switzerland he undertook important missions in Sweden and Germany.

Tria was elected the Bishop of Cariati and Gerenza and he assumed his position on 17 March 1720 in time to preside over a Synod (16 – 18 March 1726). He was transferred to the diocese of Larino, in the Molise, on 23 February 1727. He participated in a provincial council in Benevento from 1 to 12 May in 1729. In 1740, he was nominated a "consultant of the Holy Office" and in December of the same year he was nominated Archbishop of Tyre. He became the "Examiner of Bishops" and he was decorated with the insignia of the Cavalier of the Order of Saint Jacob for his meritorious service to the Court of Lisbon.

He died of apoplexy in Rome and was buried at the church of Trinita della Missione in Montecitorio.

== Works ==
His scholarly works include "The Memorable Stories, Civil and Ecclesiastical of the City and Diocese of Larino" (published in Rome, 1744), "Notes of the accommodation between the Papacy and the Royal Court of Naples" (published in Rome, 1743), and "Life of Pope Benedetto XIII".

His major work, however, is the history of the community he came to love. He wrote of Larino's earliest days prior to its conquest by Rome, the onslaught of the barbarians, the Saracens, and the Normans. Tria's scholarly writings have become an invaluable resource to the life of Molise, not only in the dim past, but during the prelate's lifetime. Since the essential physical structure of the Cathedral in Larino (1312) is unaltered, his description on the monumental entrance way of this minor basilica can be followed by the present day observer.
