= Rowland York =

English soldier of fortune and defector to Spain

Rowland York or Yorke (died 1588) was an English soldier of fortune and defector to Spain.

== Early life ==
Rowland York was the ninth of eleven sons of Sir John York. He volunteered for the Netherlands under Thomas Morgan of Llantarnam in 1572. He embarked at Gravesend on 19 March that year with his two companions, the poet George Gascoigne and William Herle, but the ship in which they sailed was nearly lost on the coast of Holland owing to the incompetence of the Dutch pilot. Reaching the English camp in safety, he took part in August that year in the attack on Goes under Captain (afterwards Sir) Humphrey Gilbert and the Prince of Orange's agent Jerome Tseraerts.

== Plots and equivocal reputation ==
Opinions differed about York. By some, he was held "bolde of courage, provident in direction, industrious in labour, and quick in execution". But his profligacy and the fact that he was a Roman Catholic caused him from the first to be distrusted by the states. In October 1580 he was reported by William Herle to Francis Walsingham to have been arrested on a charge of felony.

Four years later York was detected in a plot with John Van Imbyss to betray Ghent to the Duke of Parma. Against the advice of the Prince of Orange, who would have preferred a more summary punishment, he was clapped in prison in Brussels, whence he was released when the city fell into Parma's hands in 1585. He served at the siege of Antwerp, but by the intercession of his friends, he was allowed to return to England.

Joining the expedition under the Earl of Leicester that year, he succeeded in ingratiating himself with Sir Philip Sidney. Appointed by Leicester to the command of the Zutphen sconce, he, according to William Camden, took the opportunity thus offered him of paying back a grudge he had against the earl by surrendering the sconce to the Spaniards and inducing Sir William Stanley to do the same for Deventer.

He was appointed captain of a troop of lancers in the Spanish service; but was not, as he thought, sufficiently rewarded. Since he was known to be a bold and determined villain, it is said the Spaniards took precautions to prevent any double treachery by causing him to be poisoned.

== Death ==
He died in Zutphen on a Sunday in February 1588, having first 'received sacraments, unction, and all'. Three years later his body was exhumed and gibbeted in Zutphen by order of the states.

His heir was Edmund Yorke, who was executed at Tyburn in 1595 for attempting to assassinate Queen Elizabeth. Edmund had been persuaded by his uncle's associate Sir William Stanley, and Stanley's rather mysterious lieutenant Jacques de Francesci (Captain Jacques), that the assassination would be a meritorious act. On returning to England he quickly fell under suspicion, due perhaps to his association with the Irish fencing master Patrick O'Collun. They were both arrested, along with Richard Williams, and all three were convicted of treason and executed.
