= Siege of Grave (1586) =

1586 siege during the Eighty Years' War

- Part of the Eighty Years' War and the Anglo-Spanish War (1585–1604)
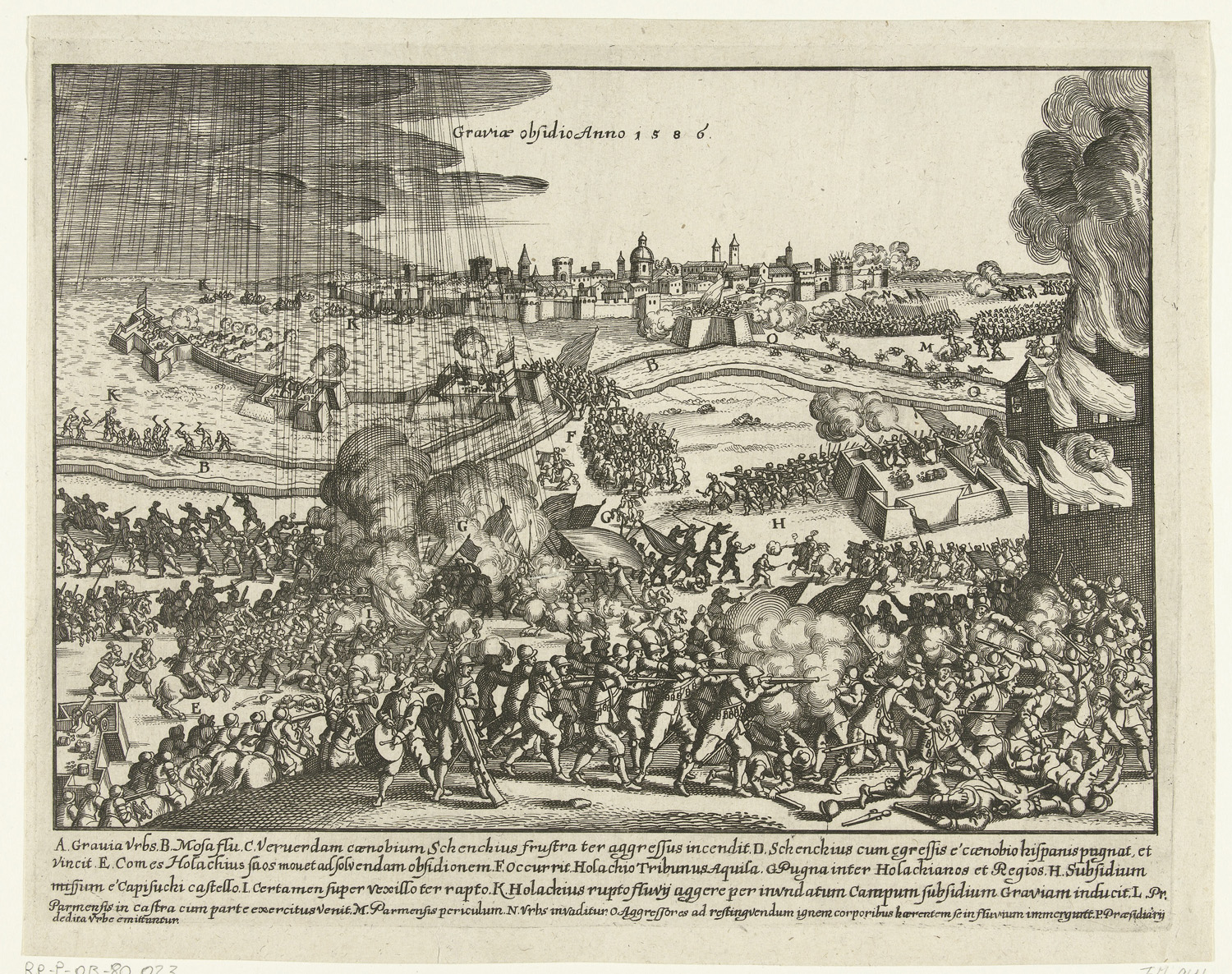
- The Siege of Grave in 1586 by Don Alejandro Farnesio – engraving by Michelangelo Cerquozzi
Date	Early April – 7 June 1586
Location	Grave, North Brabant, Low Countries (present-day the Netherlands) 51°45′33″N 5°44′18″E
Result	Spanish victory

Belligerents
(Dutch Republic) States-General; England	Spain

Commanders and leaders
(Kingdom of England) Robert Dudley (Dutch Republic) Philip of Hohenlohe (Dutch Republic) Maarten Schenck	(Spain) Alexander Farnese (Spain) Peter of Mansfeld (Spain) Juan del Águila
- Location within Netherlands Siege of Grave (1586) (North Sea)

The siege of Grave, also known as the capture of Grave of 1586, took place from mid-February to 7 June 1586 at Grave, Duchy of Brabant, Low Countries (present-day the Netherlands), between the Spanish army led by Governor-General Don Alexander Farnese, Prince of Parma, and the Dutch-States and English forces under Baron Peter van Hemart, Governor of Grave, during the Eighty Years' War and the Anglo-Spanish War (1585–1604).

== Events ==
In February 1586, the Count Peter Ernst of Mansfeld, by order of Alexander Farnese, laid siege to the town of Grave. After three months, and faced with the failure of the English and Dutch forces to relieve the city, Grave surrendered to the Spaniards on 7 June. The capture of the strategically important town of Grave by Parma, and the impotence of the English commander Sir Robert Dudley, Earl of Leicester, to relieve the town, in a time when England had raised hopes to the Dutch rebels thanks to the Treaty of Nonsuch, was a complete military and political success for the Spanish authorities, and a severe blow for the Protestant cause, provoking the start of the disagreements of the States-General of the Netherlands with the Earl of Leicester.

A few days later, the Spanish army, commanded by the Prince of Parma, laid siege to Venlo, garrisoned and supported by Dutch and English troops led by Maarten Schenck and Sir Roger Williams. On 28 June 1586 the garrison was forced to capitulate to the Spaniards.

== See also ==
- Battle of Empel
- Battle of Boksum
- Siege of Venlo (1586)
- Destruction of Neuss
- Treaty of Nonsuch
