= William Holt (Jesuit) =

English Jesuit and conspirator

William Holt (1545–1599) was an English Jesuit and conspirator, who organised several unsuccessful plots to assassinate Elizabeth I.

== Life ==
Holt was born at Ashworth in Lancashire. He was educated at home, and entered Brasenose College, Oxford, in 1563, took the degree B.A. in 1566, was elected fellow of Oriel College on 29 February 1568, and then a degree of M.A. in 1572. In 1573, he was incorporated M.A. at Cambridge.

His studies led him to dissatisfaction with religious affairs in England. In 1574 he left Oxford and was admitted into the English College, Douai where he continued his theological studies till 1576, when he was ordained and sent to Rome to help in the establishment of the English College, Rome. He entered the Society of Jesus on 10 November 1578. In 1581 he was sent to England to help in carrying out the work which had been begun by Robert Parsons and Edmund Campion. He was sent by Parsons on a mission to Scotland, together with William Crichton at the end of 1581. Their object was to open up communications with Esmé Stewart, 1st Duke of Lennox, procure the conversion or deposition of the young James VI, and send information to Mary and Philip II of Spain through the Spanish ambassador Mendoza. Holt further communicated with Henri I, Duke of Guise and in May 1582 had an interview with him in Paris.

Elizabeth meanwhile had sent to Scotland Robert Bowes to counteract the influence of Lennox, and guard against the intrigues of the Jesuits in the Scottish court. In March 1583, Bowes prevailed on the king to authorise the arrest of Holt at Leith as he was on the point of setting out for France. Holt, who passed under the name of Peter Brereton, was kept for a time in Bowes's custody, and the letters found on him were forwarded to Francis Walsingham. But James VI soon took him into his own hands, and ordered him to be imprisoned in Edinburgh Castle, while Elizabeth demanded his surrender as an English subject, and asked that he should be put to torture and compelled to confess. William Allen thought that Holt was tortured and withstood the ordeal with constancy; but Bowes's letters lead to the conclusion that torture was only threatened. James VI was himself concerned about some of Holt's intrigues. At the end of June, the king recovered his liberty from Gowrie, took matters into his own hands, and negotiated for French and Spanish help in an invasion of England. To rid himself of Bowes's importunity about Holt, James allowed him to escape from Edinburgh Castle on 16 July, and took credit with the Duke of Guise for doing so. Holt sought refuge for a time in Flanders, and visited the college at Rheims. In 1585 he returned to Scotland to work on behalf of Mary, and was harboured by George Gordon, 6th Earl of Huntly in the north,

In 1586 Holt was summoned to Rome and made rector of the English College, a post which he held for a year and a half, when in 1588 he was transferred to Brussels, to act as agent for Philip II, and direct the political activity of the English exiles. There were two factions among the exiles; one, which was headed by Parsons and supported by Allen, looked to the help of Spain for the restoration of the Roman church in England; and the other party, which represented the wishes of the Romanists in England, was opposed by the Spanish succession, and hoped to make terms with James VI of Scotland. Holt was a partisan of the Spanish faction and made no endeavour to conciliate his opponents. So long as Allen lived he managed to exert a moderating influence, but after his death in 1594 Holt's arbitrary character was left without a check. Elizabeth was afraid of the plots which were formed against her in the Low Countries, and wished to negotiate with the Archduke Ernest the surrender of Holt among others, but the ambassador was never sent. Edmund York, who was executed for high treason in 1595, is said to have confessed that Holt promised him forty thousand ducats if he would murder the queen, and the statement was repeated at Robert Southwell's trial; likewise Patrick O'Collun, executed for treason in 1594, said that Holt had promised him a generous pension and granted him absolution for killing the Queen.

Representations against Holt were made to Pope Clement VIII, who said to Barret, "Accepi nuper litteras ex Belgio de quodam patre qui ibi dominator et tyrannizat". The question was referred to the Cardinal Archduke Albert, and by him committed to the father provincial for Germany, Oliver Manareus and Don Juan Battista de Tassis. Holt's friends procured signatures to two memorials in his favour. He was not removed from his office, but was admonished to be more conciliatory, and then was replaced in 1598. He went to Rome, and thence was sent to Spain where he died early in 1599, immediately after landing at Barcelona.

== Works ==
The only writing of Holt which is preserved is a memoir Quibus modis ac mediis religio Catholica continuata est in Anglia, published by Knox, Douay Diaries, pp. 376–384. Letters from him are in the State Papers. A letter to him from Mary Queen of Scots is in Labanoff's Lettres de Marie Stuart, vi. 333, &c.
