= Siege of Sluis (1587) =

1587 siege

- Part of the Eighty Years' War and the Anglo-Spanish War (1585–1604)
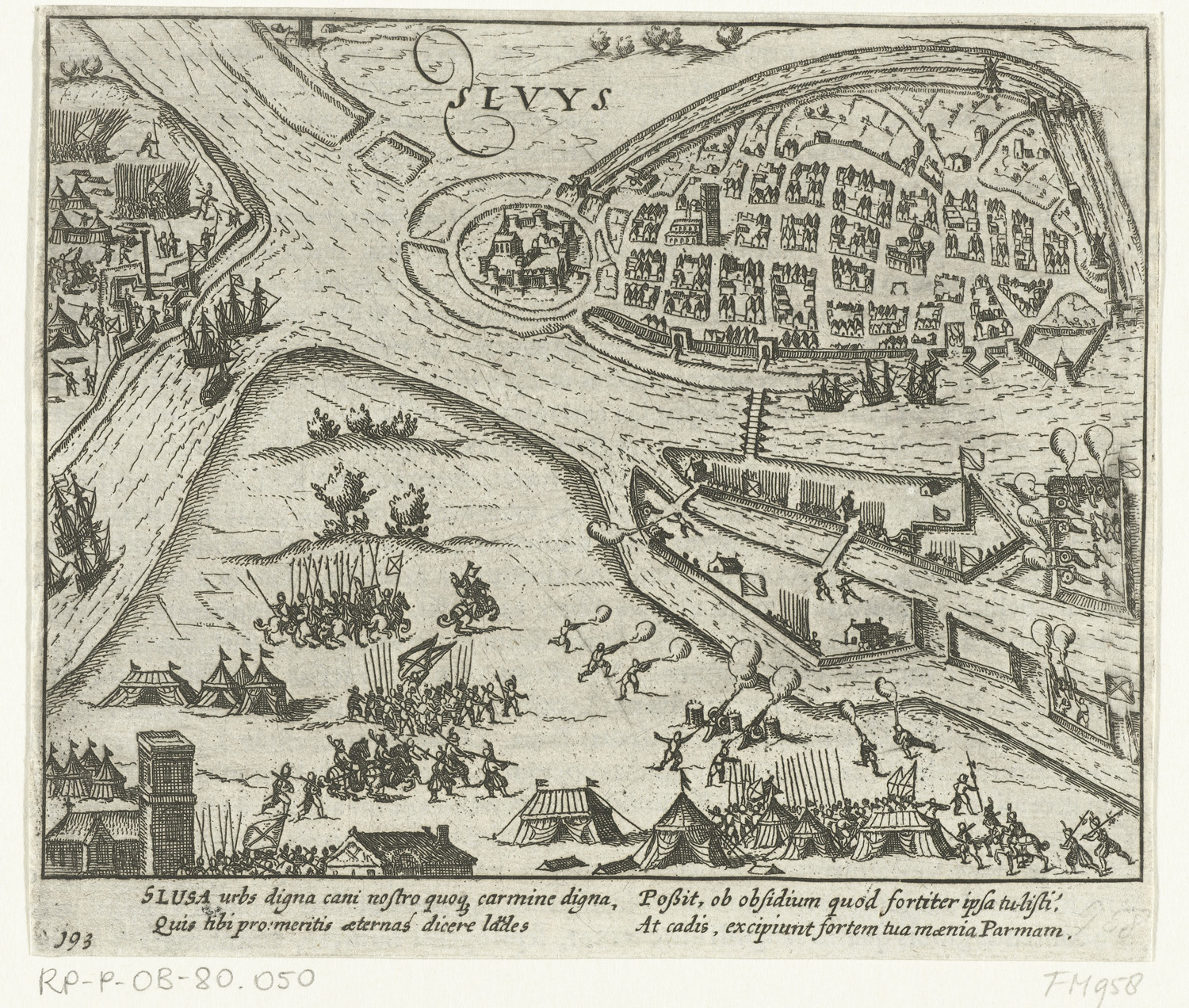
- Engraving Siege of Sluis of 1587 by Frans Hogenberg. Collection Rijksmuseum Amsterdam.
Date	12 June – 4 August 1587
Location	Sluis, Zeeland, Low Countries (present-day the Netherlands) 51°21′N 3°30′E
Result	Spanish victory

Belligerents
(Dutch Republic) States-General; England	Spain

Commanders and leaders
(Kingdom of England) Robert Dudley (Kingdom of England) Roger Williams	(Spain) Alexander Farnese

Casualties and losses
700 killed and 400 wounded	92 killed and 243 wounded

The siege of Sluis of 1587 took place between 12 June and 4 August 1587, as part of the Eighty Years' War and the Anglo-Spanish War (1585–1604). Its capture by the Spanish formed a significant advance towards the Enterprise of England.

== Objectives and investment ==
June 1587 saw Don Alexander Farnese, Duke of Parma (Spanish: Alejandro Farnesio), Governor-General of the Spanish Netherlands, and commander-in-chief of the Army of Flanders, set his sights on the two remaining rebel ports in Flanders, Ostend and Sluis. The latter had once been a strategic deep-water port, and was still (despite silting) a key to the inland waterways of the Flanders coast, and thus to any potential invasion of Britain. After an initial sortie against Ostend, Parma invested Sluis on 12 June 1587, but not in time to prevent a body of four companies of English foot-soldiers reaching the town from Ostend under the command of Sir Roger Williams. On 24 June, the bombardment of the town began.

== Relief efforts and surrender ==
A relief effort was organised by a fleet of English and Dutch troops under Sir Robert Dudley, Earl of Leicester, Governor-General of the United Provinces. Leicester landed a force of 4000 foot, 400 horse at Ostend, to cut Parma’s communications, but called his men back to the fleet before coming to grips with any Spaniards; while a sea-borne attempt to force the channel and relieve the town was similarly aborted: Garrett Mattingly concluded that “The chief effect of this fortnight of imbecile manoeuvres was on the morale of the beleaguered garrison”. On 4 August, after of 13 days of constant fighting around the walls, the garrison surrendered with full honours of war.

== Aftermath ==
The loss of the English-held port of Sluis revealed the inability of Leicester to assert his authority over the Dutch allies, who failed to cooperate successfully in relieving the town, and led to recriminations between the governor-general and the States of Holland.

In the following months, the Earl of Leicester launched a series of unsuccessful attacks against the Spaniards. In September 1587, Leicester attempted to capture Leiden, but failed, and his plans to capture Enkhuizen and Hoorn, two important ports of West Friesland, also failed. Notable English soldiers under Leicester's command were Sir Thomas Baskerville and Sir Francis Vere. On 16 December 1587, Leicester returned to England, where the privy council tried in vain to hold him to account for his failures, protected as he was by the favour of the Queen.

By contrast, Parma had gained a strategic prize that enabled him to move barges by inland waterways from the Scheldt to Dunkirk, preparatory to the coming of the Spanish Armada.

== See also ==
- Battle of Zutphen
- Siege of Bergen-op-Zoom (1588)
- Dutch Revolt
- List of governors of the Spanish Netherlands
