= Patrick O'Collun =

Irish soldier and fencing master

Patrick O'Collun, also known as Patrick Cullen or Patrick Collen, (died 1594) was an Irish soldier and fencing master who was executed at Tyburn in 1594 for treason, in that he had conspired to murder Queen Elizabeth I.

== Background ==
Little is known of his early life, other than the fact that he was Irish and a Roman Catholic. He first appeared in London in the late 1580s, as a fencing teacher in the entourage of Sir Florence MacCarthy, chief of the MacCarthy clan, (the MacCarthy Mór), whose own loyalty to the Crown was deeply suspect, and who was later accused by his enemies of being a party to O'Collun's plot.

== Conspiracy ==
About 1590, O'Collun went to the Spanish Netherlands, where he entered the service of the renegade English Roman Catholic soldier Sir William Stanley: Stanley and his associate, the Jesuit William Holt, instigated numerous plots to assassinate Elizabeth. According to the indictment at O'Collun's trial, the prime mover in the plot was Stanley's lieutenant Jacques de Francesci (also called Jacques Fraunces or "Captain Jacques"), a rather shadowy individual who was regarded by the English Crown throughout the 1590s as one of the Queen's most determined enemies. It was Francesci who obtained money to bribe O'Collun to kill Elizabeth and promised him a pension from the King of Spain as a reward for the assassination.

O'Collun later claimed that he had qualms of conscience about the plot, which led him to ask Fr. Holt whether the assassination was morally justified; according to his account Holt told him that it was an act of tyrannicide, and gave him absolution in advance for the sin of murder. This claim may well be true: Holt sincerely believed that Elizabeth deserved to die, as did "Captain Jacques", who is known to have said that "no action could be more glorious" (although Jacques himself had once worked as a spy for Elizabeth). Other would-be assassins, like Edmund York, said that Holt had given them absolution for the same act. Holt's plotting attracted so much notoriety that he was eventually ordered by his superiors to show more discretion, though they did not suggest that he should cease his activities.

== Arrest and confession ==
O'Collun, with his accomplices John Annias and William Polwhele (who were both soldiers in Stanley's regiment), returned to England in November 1593, where his behaviour soon attracted suspicion- in particular, he was found to possess a copy of the Jesuit pamphlet Philopater, which justified tyrannicide. He, Annias, and Polwhele were arrested and interrogated. O'Collun and Annias confessed "after a fashion", which presumably meant under torture: Polwhele turned informer.

Apart from the probability that it was obtained under torture, there is some doubt about the reliability of O'Collun's confession, since the Crown's interrogators, as was usual in treason cases, put pressure on the suspect to confess to what they wished to hear. It seems that at first O'Collun and Annias would confess only to a plot to kill "The Spaniard". This was undoubtedly Antonio Pérez, former Secretary of State to the King of Spain. Pérez, imprisoned in Spain for treason against his former master, had escaped and fled to England, where he became the target of assassination plots financed by the Spanish authorities: he was, therefore, a plausible target for O'Collun. The Crown put intense pressure on O'Collun to admit that his real target was the Queen, and he eventually confessed to this, thus allowing the Crown to bring a charge of regicide, rather than attempted murder.

Whether the Queen or Pérez was the real target of the plot is now impossible to determine. O'Collun's claim that he received absolution from Holt for killing a heretical tyrant would seem to point to the Queen as the intended victim since it is less likely that Holt would have absolved him for the murder of Pérez, who could not reasonably be described as either a tyrant or a heretic.

The Crown's motive in extracting a confession of regicide from O'Collun is not entirely clear: possibly they were hoping to bolster their parallel case against Dr Rodrigo Lopez, Court physician to Elizabeth and an accomplished double agent, who was tried and convicted on an almost identical charge the day before O'Collun's trial.

== Trial and execution ==
He was tried before a commission of oyer and terminer at Westminster on 1 March 1594; despite his alleged confession, he pleaded not guilty. The principal witness against him was his accomplice William Polwhele, who testified that Stanley and Jacques Fraunces had hired O'Collun, Annias and himself to kill the Queen. O'Collun was found guilty and sentenced to be hanged at Tyburn. He was executed, with Annias, the following July, by which time he was so ill with gaol fever that it was said to be hardly worth the trouble of hanging him at all. By coincidence Pérez, whom he admitted to having planned to kill, passed by just as O'Collun's head was being put on a spike.

Richard Williams and Edmund York, arrested at the same time on suspicion of a separate plot to kill Elizabeth, were executed the following year. The allegation made by other Irishmen, John Danyell and Hugh Cahill (also of the Stanley regiment), from 1592 of a plot to blow up the Tower of London was brought to light, as if the plot were freshly hatched, although neither man was held in custody. So in a brief period around 1594, there was an unusual concentration of investigations into continental conspiracies to this end - a "panic over Irishmen in London" - and the suggestion is that Lord Burghley and the Earl of Essex manipulated their information and intelligence to convince the Queen of an immediate and credible threat to her life, as they vied for her favour.

== Aftermath ==
Elizabeth was sufficiently concerned by the plot, however ineffective it had been, to write to the Spanish authorities in Brussels protesting at their willingness to let the Spanish Netherlands become a safe haven for English conspirators, and demanding, without success, the extradition of Holt and other conspirators.

=== Doctor Lopez ===
See main article: Rodrigo Lopez

The Crown explicitly linked "the O'Collun plot" with "the Lopez plot": the arrests, interrogations, trials and executions closely coincided in time, and there was some common evidence at the trials. There is however no evidence of a link between the two men, although Lopez probably knew, at least in general terms, of a plot to kill Antonio Pérez. Unlike O'Collun, he denied to the very end that he had planned to kill the Queen. While there is little doubt that O'Collun was a paid assassin, some historians believe that Lopez's guilt or innocence is now impossible to determine.
