= Battle of Zutphen =

16th-century European battle

- Part of the Eighty Years' War and the Anglo-Spanish War (1585–1604)
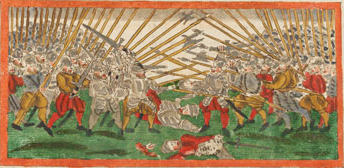
- Picture by Johann Jakob Wick illustrating his report about the Battle of Zutphen, published on 12 October 1586
Date	22 September 1586
Location	Zutphen, Guelders (present-day the Netherlands) 52°08′51″N 6°12′18″E
Result	Spanish victory

Belligerents
England (Dutch Republic) States-General	(Habsburg Spain) Spain

Commanders and leaders
(Kingdom of England) Robert Dudley (Kingdom of England) Philip Sidney †	(Habsburg Spain) Duke of Parma (Habsburg Spain) Marquis of Vasto (Habsburg Spain) Francisco Verdugo

Strength
17,000	25,500

Casualties and losses
6,000 killed and wounded	4,500 killed and wounded
- Location within Netherlands Battle of Zutphen (North Sea)

The Battle of Zutphen was fought on 22 September 1586, near the village of Warnsveld and the town of Zutphen, the Netherlands, during the Eighty Years' War and the Anglo-Spanish War (1585–1604). It was fought between the forces of the United Provinces of the Netherlands, aided by the English, against the Spanish. In 1585, England signed the Treaty of Nonsuch with the States-General of the Netherlands and formally entered the war against Spain. Robert Dudley, Earl of Leicester, was appointed as the Governor-General of the Netherlands and sent there in command of an English army to support the Dutch rebels. When Alessandro Farnese, Duke of Parma and commander of the Spanish Army of Flanders, besieged the town of Rheinberg during the Cologne War, Leicester, in turn, besieged the town of Zutphen, in the province of Gelderland and on the eastern bank of the river IJssel.

Zutphen was strategically important to Farnese, as it allowed his troops to levy war contributions in the rich Veluwe region. Therefore, he left some troops blockading Rheinberg and marched to relieve the town. He personally supplied Zutphen at first, but as the Anglo-Dutch siege continued, he assembled a large convoy whose delivery to the town he entrusted to Alfonso Félix de Ávalos Aquino y Gonzaga, Marquis del Vasto/Guasto. Leicester learned of this when a courier dispatched by Farnese to Francisco Verdugo, the man in charge of Zutphen, was intercepted. The English and Dutch prepared an ambush, in which many English knights and noblemen were involved. In the end, the Spanish succeeded in delivering the convoy safely to Zutphen after a hard-fought battle. The Spanish cavalry, composed mainly of Italians and Albanians, was defeated by the English cavalry under the Earl of Essex. The Spanish infantry, however, held its ground and delivered the convoy to Zutphen. From there, reinforced by Verdugo, the Spanish troops forced the English to retreat.

Zutphen was secured for the Spanish, though in the following weeks the English managed to capture a major Spanish fort, Zutphen's sconce, on the bank of the IJssel river opposite the town. Most of the English gains were negated when, months later, the English governors of Deventer and Zutphen's sconce defected to the Spanish ranks and handed over their places to Farnese.

== Background ==
In 1585, Queen Elizabeth I of England took the United Provinces of the Netherlands under her protection and signed the Treaty of Nonsuch with the States-General. England dispatched 5,000 infantry and 1,000 cavalry soldiers to the Low Countries, and Robert Dudley, Earl of Leicester, was proclaimed Governor-General of the Netherlands. Commanding untrained and badly paid levies, Leicester was unable to prevent the Army of Flanders under Alessandro Farnese, from seizing the towns of Grave, Venlo and Neuss, though he managed to take Axel.

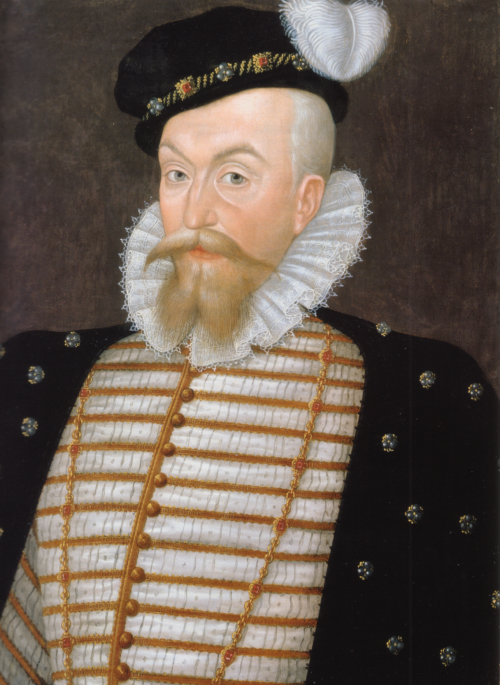
Robert Dudley, Earl of Leicester (ca. 1580–1585). Circle of William Segar

When Farnese besieged Rheinberg in September 1586, Leicester's army marched towards Zutphen and took a Spanish sconce on the left bank of the IJssel river. On 18 September Leicester laid a pontoon bridge over the IJssel and took positions on the right bank of the river, thus encircling Zutphen. Leicester's Anglo-Dutch army consisted of 8,000 infantry—mainly English and Scottish, but also 1,400 Irish—and 3,000 cavalry. Robert Devereux, Earl of Essex, led the cavalry, John Norreys the infantry, and William Pelham the camp, in which Gebhard Truchsess von Waldburg, the deposed Archbishop of Cologne, and Manuel, son of the Prior of Crato, claimant to the Portuguese crown, all resided.

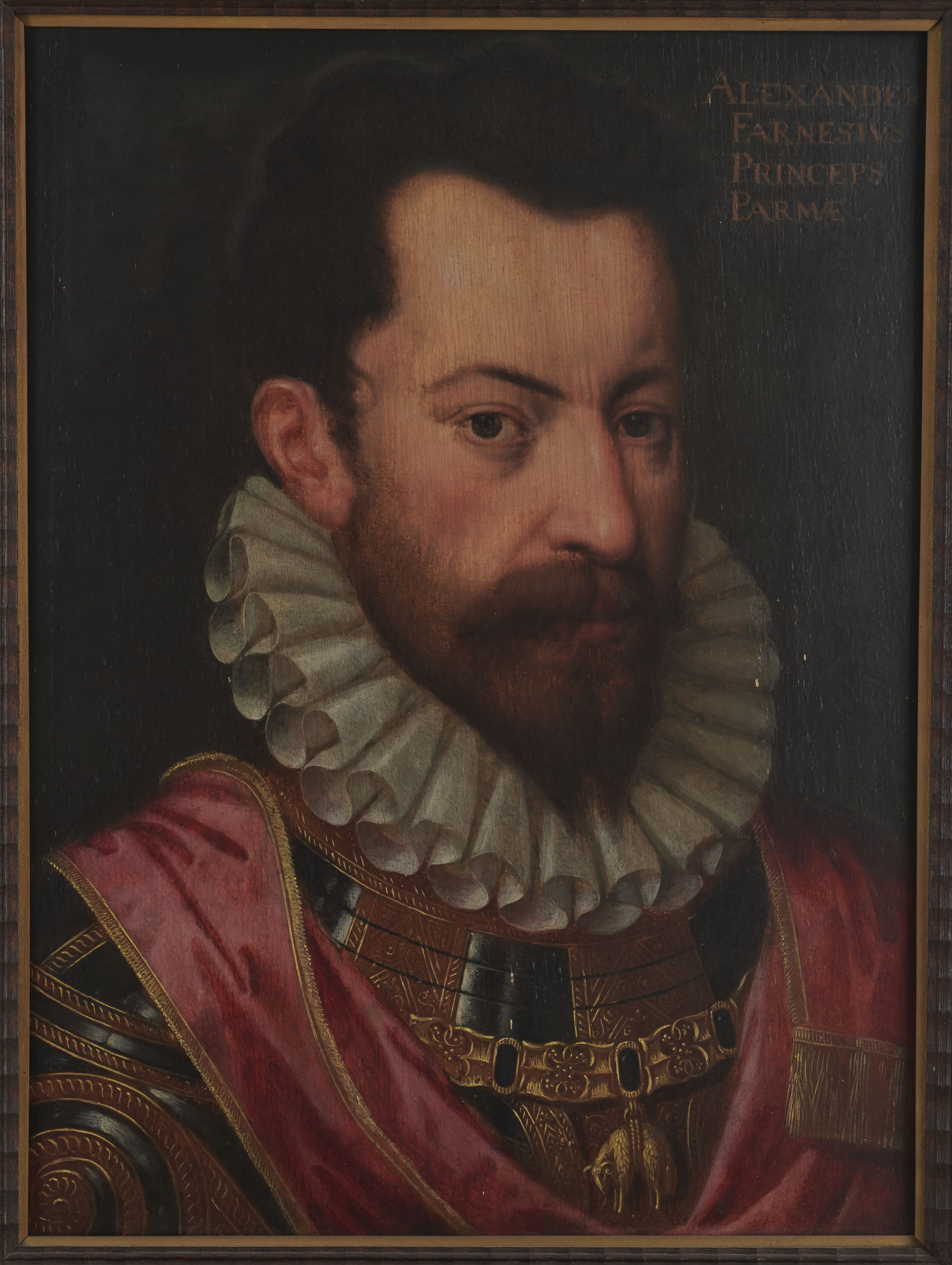
Alessandro Farnese (ca. 1590). Antoon Claeissens

On receiving news of the siege, Farnese dispatched the governor of Friesland, Francisco Verdugo, to Borculo with 400 infantry and two cavalry companies, and Verdugo's lieutenant Johann Baptista von Taxis to Zutphen with 600 infantry and two cavalry companies. As the siege continued, Farnese left some troops to blockade Rheinberg and supplied Zutphen in person with 600 cavalry and a convoy of 300 wagons of wheat. Leicester was in Deventer then, but on receiving news of Farnese's approach, he returned to Zutphen's camp. He found, on his arrival, that Counts Philip of Hohenlohe-Neuenstein and William Louis of Nassau-Dillenburg had entrenched the army on a hillock along the right bank of the IJssel. Leicester was informed of the possible ways through which the Spanish army might attempt to supply the town, but because of a misunderstanding no troops were deployed to guard the roads.

Led by Farnese himself and Francisco Verdugo, the Spanish troops left Borculo at night, passed next to the Dutch town of Lochem and reached Zutphen through a narrow way flanked by deep woods. Farnese prayed in the St. Walburgis church and later on walked up its tower to watch the English army. The following morning a war council was held after a captured Scottish officer was interrogated and revealed Leicester's plans and strength. Farnese considered the possibility of defending the town himself, but Verdugo dissuaded him to avoid "giving the Queen of England the fame that Prince of Parma was like a prisoner inside Zutphen". Farnese returned to Borculo, entrusted the command of the town to Verdugo, and sent Taxis to guard a fort nearby. While the siege continued, he marched to Lingen with his army to intercept a corps of reiters who were being recruited in Germany under Elizabeth I's orders. When he arrived, however, the reiters had dissolved for lack of pay.

== Battle ==
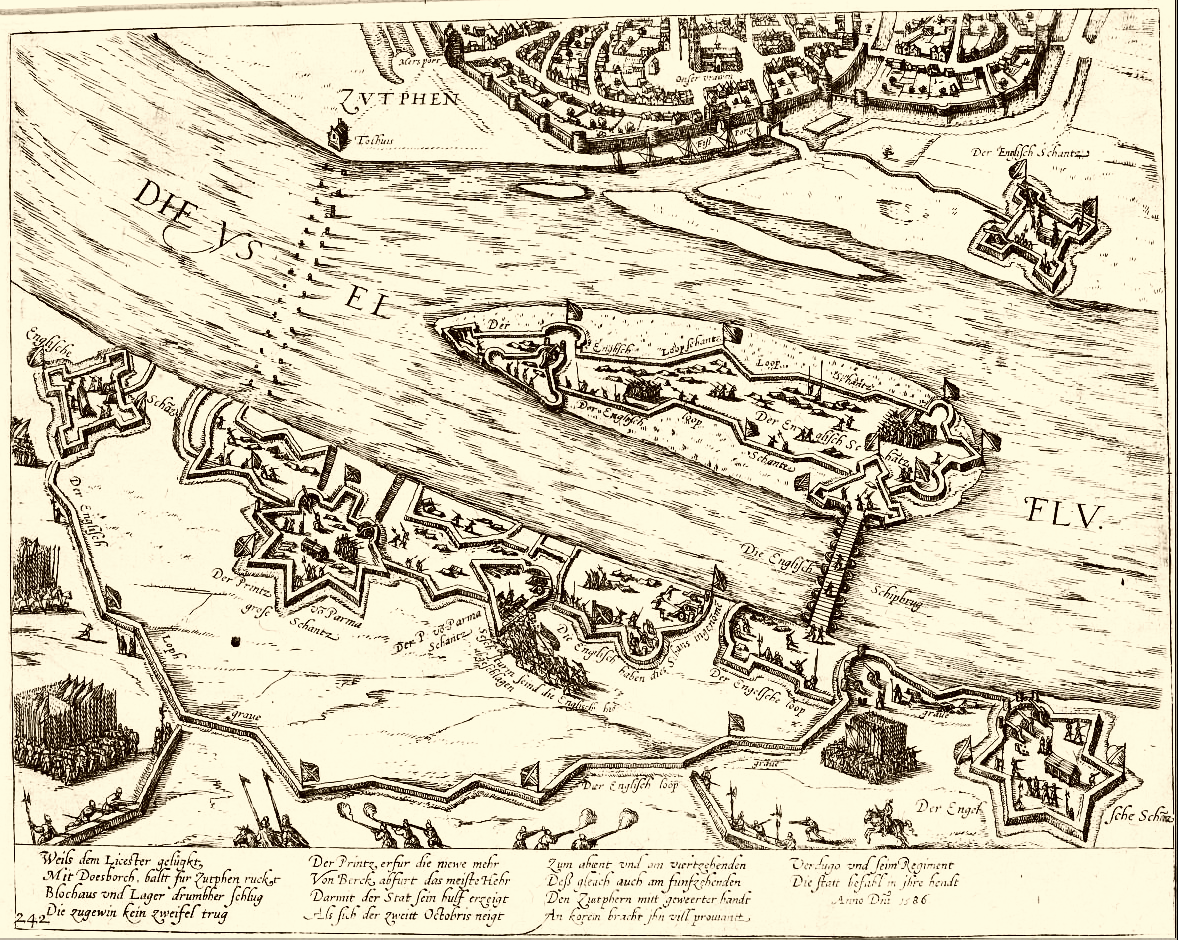
Leicester's siege of Zutphen and Zutphen's sconce in 1586. Anonymous

=== Preparations ===
To preserve Zutphen's garrison, Farnese gathered enough food to feed 4,000 men for three months in the towns of Groenlo, Oldenzaal, Lingen and Münster. As this food was carried to Borculo, a large convoy was formed to resupply Zutphen. Farnese gave command of the mission to Alfonso Félix de Ávalos Aquino y Gonzaga, Marquis del Vasto, under whom he put an escort of 2,500 infantry—1,000 of them Spanish—and 600 Italian and Albanian cavalry, according to the Jesuit historian Famiano Strada, or just 600 infantry and 300 cavalry as claimed by the Spanish chronicler and soldier Alonso Vázquez, who was an eyewitness. On 21 September Farnese sent a letter to Verdugo commanding him to leave Zutphen with 1,000 men, meet the convoy, and deliver it to the town. Farnese's courier, however, was intercepted near Lochem and Leicester learned of the convoy. Persuaded by one of his confidants, Captain Rowland York, he prepared an ambush. York had served for some years in the Dutch States Army before being imprisoned on charges of pretending to surrender Dendermonde to the Spanish. When Brussels fell to Farnese, he was freed and went to serve Leicester, whose confidence he earned.

Leicester waited for the Spanish convoy near the small village of Warnsveld, half a mile from Zutphen. Supported by the Earl of Essex, Sir John Norreys, Sir William Stanley, Lord Willoughby, his nephew the poet and courtier Sir Philip Sidney, and William Russell, Leicester commanded 1,500 infantry and 200 cavalry, according to the coeval English scholar Edward Grimeston. Famiano Strada increases these numbers to 3,000 infantry and 400 cavalry, and Alonso Vázquez to about 8,000, many of them veteran Frisians under Count William Louis of Nassau-Dillenburg. The 19th-century American historian John Lothrop Motley, on the other hand, reduces the strength of the English force to 200 cavalry and 300 pikemen, though adding that "a much stronger force of infantry was held in reserve and readiness". The English soldiers, unlike the Dutch, were anxious to engage the Spanish troops. Rowland York told Leicester that he understood Spanish tactics, and that Spaniards were incomparable to English soldiers.

Leicester formed his army over a deep, narrow way, with the elevation where the Dutch were entrenched behind. He deployed his cavalry in two squadrons, formed a large infantry battalion, put 300 or 350 advanced pikemen under Sir William Stanley and Lord Audley next to the way, and flanked the road with manchas (mancha, a Spanish term for a company of firearm-armed infantry) of musketeers and arquebusiers. As the morning on 22 September was very misty, the English met the convoy before they expected. The Spanish cavalry opened the way followed by a battalion of foot, two manchas of musketeers flanking the wagons, and some cavalry closing the way. Del Vasto left part of his cavalry near Lochem to guard the rear of the convoy. At 8:00 am, when the Spanish, led by the Marquis del Vasto himself, had passed Warnsveld, Stanley and Lord Audley began to skirmish with the Spanish vanguard. After the first clashes, the Earl of Essex charged upon the Spanish with the English cavalry, crying "Follow me, good fellows, for the honour of England and of England's Queen!"

=== Ambush ===
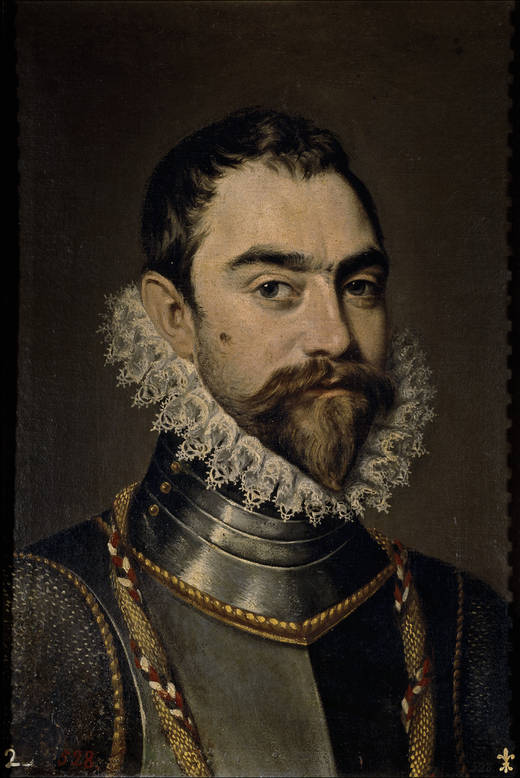
Colonel Francisco Verdugo (ca. 1590–1600). Anonymous, Italian school

The Spanish vanguard was driven off by the English at the first charge, but the Spanish pikemen under captains Pedro Manrique and Manuel de Vega, from Francisco Arias de Bobadilla's and Juan del Águila's tercios, formed the defenders into squadron formation and kept the way open for the wagons. As the carters fled at the beginning of the fight, the Spanish arquebusiers had to take their places and brought the wagons towards Zutphen. Stanley's pikemen charged upon the Spanish squadron, but they were repelled at the push of pike. As the fight approached Zutphen and Francisco Verdugo noticed the musketry fire, he ordered a wagon to be loaded with powder and bullets and sent it to the Spanish arquebusiers. The English cavalry, in the meantime, charged over the Spanish pikes on one of its flanks. Though they succeeded in breaking the two or three foremost ranks, Essex's men could not penetrate further. Twice more the English charged upon the squadron, but they were again repelled.

To reduce the pressure on the Spanish infantry, the Marquis del Vasto collected his cavalry and charged against Stanley's infantry, being in turn repelled. He was nearly killed when an English soldier attacked him with a battleaxe, but a Spanish light horseman surnamed Arenas saved him by transfixing the English with his lance. Del Vasto retired from the fight and met Verdugo and Johann Baptista von Taxis, who sallied from Zutphen with several units of troops to join the battle. At the same time they were conversing, English troops unsuccessfully attacked Zutphen's sconce on the other side of the IJssel, which was defended by Count Herman van den Bergh with some men. For a moment, Verdugo thought that the skirmish was inside Zutphen and the town burghers had risen in arms against the few Spanish troops he had left behind the walls. Leicester committed the same mistake, believing that the Frisians under Count William Louis of Nassau-Dillenburg were fighting against the Spanish inside Zutphen.

During the confusion, the cavalry left behind by Del Vasto, which included the Italian and Epirote companies under Appio Conti, Hannibal Gonzaga, George Crescia, the Marquis of Bentivoglio and Nicolo Cefis, reached Zutphen. Count Hannibal Gonzaga and the Albanian captain George Crescia attacked the English on their own, without Del Vasto's orders. Crescia was dismounted and taken prisoner by Lord Willoughby, while Gonzaga, not wearing his close helmet, received a serious slash in the neck and fell from his horse. On the English side, Philip Sidney, governor of Vlissingen, was fatally wounded by a musket ball in the leg during the final charge. The Spanish cavalry then sought protection behind the infantry, which kept the English cavalry at bay. Verdugo, supported by the Albanian captain Nicolao Basta and the Spanish Evangelista de las Cuevas, Commissar General of the cavalry, managed to restore order in the Spanish ranks. Seeing the good order of Verdugo and Del Vasto's men, the English and Dutch commanders did not renew the action and began to retire back to their camp. A handful of Spanish pikemen, including some low ranking officers, disobeyed their orders and began to pursue the English.

== Aftermath ==
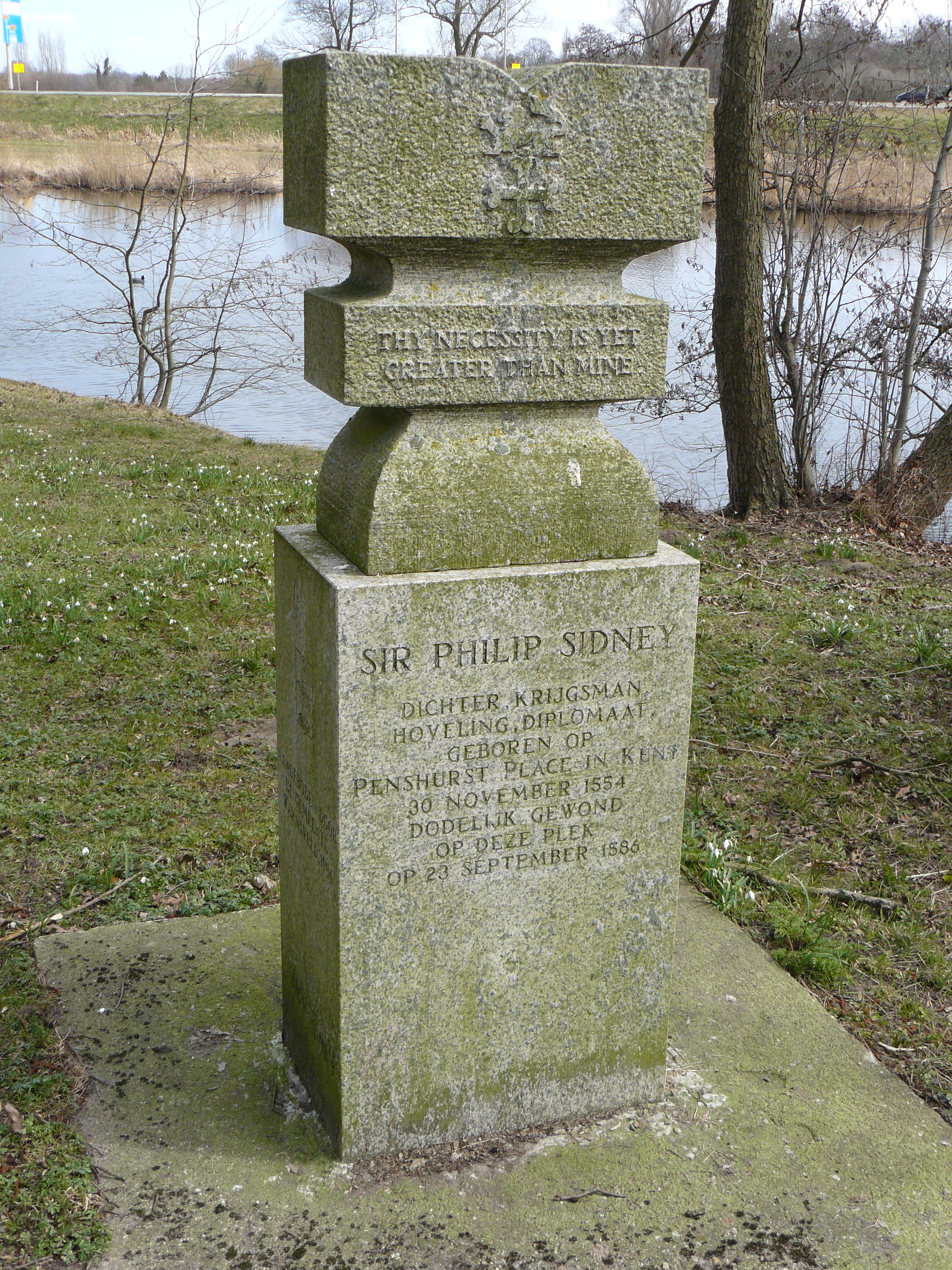
Memorial for Sir Philip Sidney at the spot where he was fatally injured

The Spanish soldier Alonso Vázquez labelled the Battle of Zutphen as "one of the best factions that until that time was ever seen in Flanders". For many years it was common among Spaniards and Netherlanders to call a hard-fought action "as warm as the fight of Zutphen". According to John Lothrop Motley, "it is probable that the encounter would have been forgotten by posterity but by the melancholy close up upon that field to Sidney's bright career". Sidney allegedly had removed his cuisses when he saw that William Pelham was not wearing any. However, by the 1590s cavalry soldiers wore less armour than in the past, and this, instead of Sidney's solidarity toward his companion, cost his life. Sidney was carried to the town of Arnhem to recover, but he died three weeks later of gangrene, as surgeons were unable to extract the bullet. Historians are uncertain about the number of casualties both sides suffered during the battle. Motley claims 13 horse and 22 foot killed on the English side, against 'perhaps' 200 men on the Spanish side. On the other hand, Vázquez claimed that the Spanish "were winners with very little loss, having wounded and slaughtered many people to the rebels".

On 12 October, for the third time, Farnese supplied the garrison of Zutphen, personally, as he had done the first time. Later on, he sent Verdugo back to Friesland and left Johann Baptista von Taxis in charge of Zutphen. After that, the Spanish army took its winter quarters. When Farnese moved to Brussels to spend the winter there, the Earl of Leicester continued the siege of Zutphen. He was not able to take the town, but succeeded in occupying several forts beyond the IJssel, including Zutphen's sconce, which was carried by surprise by Edward Stanley, brother of William Stanley, and 12 other soldiers. Shortly after the English and Dutch also took their winter quarters. Sir William Stanley was given the command of Deventer, Sir John Burroughs of Doesburg, and Rowland York of Zutphen's sconce. Stanley's and York's appointments were met with suspicion by the Dutch States, because Stanley was openly Catholic and York a man of dissolute character. Leicester expressed his full confidence in both soldiers, but in 1587 Stanley and York shifted sides to the Spanish party and handed Deventer and Zutphen's sconce over to Taxis.

Stanley and York's acts not only negated the gains of the 1586 campaign, but also undermined Leicester's reputation and the Dutch States confidence in the English troops. The Dutch States decided to appoint Count Maurice of Nassau as Governor-General of the Netherlands and Philip of Hohenlohe as his lieutenant. With the loss of Deventer and Zutphen's sconce, the Spanish were able to levy war contributions in the provinces of Utrecht, Overijssel and Gelderland. Zutphen and Deventer remained in Spanish control until their capture in 1591 by Maurice of Nassau.
