= Roman Catholic Diocese of Larino =

Diocese located in the province of Campobasso, Southern Italy

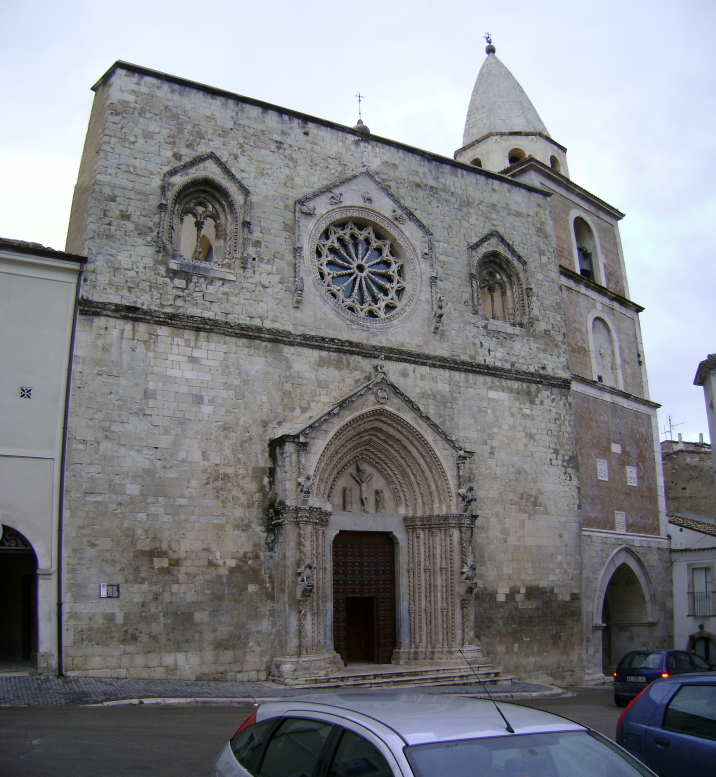
Cathedral of S. Pardo

The Catholic diocese of Larino is located in the province of Campobasso, Southern Italy, c. 18 mi. (29 km) south of Termoli. It existed from the 7th century until 1986. In that year it was united into the diocese of Termoli-Larino. It was a suffragan of the archdiocese of Benevento.

== History ==
The repopulated Larino is a mile from the site of the ancient Larinum (Larino Vecchio), destroyed by war and epidemic. The known bishops of Larinum were: Justus (attested 492 to 496), Aprile (his successor, c. 496–501) and Joannes (attested 555–560).

In 493/494, Pope Gelasius I granted Bishop Justus permission to consecrate a basilica in honor of the Archangel Michael, which had been built in his diocese by Priscillianus and Felicissima. They were to be warned, however, that, in donating the basilica to the church and having it consecrated, they surrendered all rights over it.

Among the bishops traditionally claimed were Saint Pardus, named as the first bishop and said to have died in 650. His alleged remains were not brought to Larino until the 9th or 10th century

On 11 November 943, Pope Marinus II granted a privilege to Bishop Joannes of Benevento, which included "whatever your predecessors were seen to possess legally and reasonably by ancient law," including: "Bivinem, Asculum, Larinum, Sipontum et ecclesiam s. Michaelis archangeli in Monte Gargano cum omnibus earum pertinentiis et omnia praedia." In 952, Larino was under the control of the Lombard princes, Landulf II and Pandulf I, who confirmed a number of grants to the monastery of Montecassino, including the church of S. Benedict, inside the walls of Larino, which had been built by the priest and monk Leo, who was afterwards made pseudoepiscopus.

On 26 May 969, Pope John XIII raised Benevento to the rank of archdiocese, granted its bishop Landolfus the title of archbishop with the pallium, and the right to consecrate bishops in his territory: "facultatemque consecrandi episcopos in locis, quibus olim fuerant, scilicet Sancta Agathe, Abellino, Quintodecimo, Ariano, Asculo, Bibinae, Vulturaria, Larino, Thelesia, Alifis."

In 1120 (or 1125), an earthquake struck Larino, causing considerable damage. The monastery of S. Felice was destroyed.

In 1166, Bishop Petrus of Larino held a diocesan synod.

In 1300, another severe earthquake caused great damage to Larino.

=== Politics and scandal ===
Perronius was already Bishop of Larino under Pope Martin IV (1281–1285), the former chancellor of Louis IX of France. The pope was a great supporter of his fellow countryman, Charles of Anjou, King Louis' brother, whom the papacy had recognized as King of Sicily. Bishop Perronius was no supporter of the French. He was denounced to Cardinal Gerardo Bianchi, Bishop of Sabina and papal legate in Sicily, for serious faults and gross excesses (ob culpas graves et enormes excessus), and was suspended from office by the legate. Perronius was ordered to present himself at the papal court, which was living in exile in Perugia, and explain his conduct to Martin IV face-to-face. He did so, but without giving satisfaction. He then left the court, without permission, and returned to Larino, where he continued his activities against the heirs of King Charles and the papacy, engaging in sedition and conspiracy. Pope Honorius IV (1285–1287) ordered the archbishop of Benevento, on 4 April 1285, to cite Bishop Perronius to the papal court within thirty days.

in a letter of 6 August 1289, Pope Nicholas IV had given Cardinal Berardus, his legate in Sicily, the mandate of finding a suitable place for Bishop Saba. Saba had been driven out of his own diocese, the see of Mileto. Cardinal Berardus appointed Bishop Saba as administrator of the diocese of Larino, which was regarded as a vacant see, on a temporary basis (usque ad suum beneplacitum). On 13 September 1291, following the death of Cardinal Berardus, Pope Nicholas IV renewed the appointment.

Bishop Joannes of Milevito was appointed administrator of Larino by Cardinal Landolfo Brancaccio, Cardinal Deacon of S. Angelo in Pescheria. After his death, Pope Boniface VIII granted the administratorship of the diocese of Larino to Archbishop Joannes d'Alatri of Benevento, on 8 May 1299. Archbishop Joannes was transferred to the diocese of Capua on 2 January 1301. His successor, Adenulf, was also named apostolic administrator of Larino.

On 11 April 1301, however, Pope Boniface decided to appoint the rehabilitated bishop of Fiesole, Angelo, his apostolic administrator of Larino, pastore vacantis. The appointment was temporary, usque ad beneplacitum Sedis Apostolice. Bishop Angelo was transferred to the diocese of Methone (Mothon, Modon) on 2 November 1303.

On 22 February (or 8 March) 1304, Pope Benedict XI appointed Pasquale, one time bishop of Cassano, apostolic administrator of the diocese of Larino, on a temporary basis (usque ad Apostolicae Sedis beneplacitum).

Bishop Perronius of Larino finally died in the first half of 1309, after a suspension lasting a quarter-century. The cathedral Chapter of Larino proceeded to conduct an election of his successor, under the leadership of the Archpriest Garinus. They chose to proceed by the way of compromise, and appointed a committee composed of Archpriest Garinus and the canons Hugo Roberti, and Luca Magni Petri. They chose Bishop Pasquale, who was serving as the apostolic administrator. and sent procurators to the papal court, with a postulatio in his favor. Pope Clement V appointed a committee of three cardinals to examine the proceedings. On 15 July 1309, the pope signed documents approving the selection of Bishop Pasquale as bishop of Larino.

=== Population and earthquakes ===
On 5 December 1456, a very strong earthquake devastated the entire northern part of the kingdom of Naples. Larino was completely ruined, and 1,313 persons died.

The city of Larino had a population of c. 200 persons in 1686. On 5 June 1688, the Sannio earthquake, centered on Benevento, caused widespread damage. Guadalfiera was destroyed.

By 1742, it is estimated that the population of the city had reached c. 2,300.

=== Synods ===
A diocesan synod was an irregularly held, but important, meeting of the bishop of a diocese and his clergy. Its purpose was (1) to proclaim generally the various decrees already issued by the bishop; (2) to discuss and ratify measures on which the bishop chose to consult with his clergy; (3) to publish statutes and decrees of the diocesan synod, of the provincial synod, and of the Holy See.

Bishop Belisario Balduino (1555–1591) presided over a diocesan synod on 26 March 1556; and a second on 28 May 1565. Bishop Gerolamo Vela (1591–1611) held two diocesan synods, one on 12 January 1594, and the other on 26 May 1606. On 27 May 1614, Bishop Giovanni Tommaso Eustachio (1612–1616) presided over a diocesan synod. Bishop Gregorio Pomodoro (1616–1626) held a diocesan synod in Larino on 5 June 1620. Diocesan synods were held by Bishop Persio Caracci (1631–1656) on 7 April 1633, 22 March 1637, 4 May 1642, 12 May 1647, 2 May 1649, 11 April 1653, and 11 April 1655. Bishop Giuseppe Catalini (1686–1703) held a diocesan synod in Larino in 1690).

Bishop Pianetti held a diocesan synod in 1711. Bishop Giovanni Andrea Tria (1726–1741) held a diocesan synod on 11–13 April 1728. In December 1785, Bishop Carlo d'Ambrosio (1775–1796) held a diocesan synod.

Bishop Raffaele Lupoli (1818–1827) held a diocesan synod on 24–26 April 1826. Bishop Pietro Bottazzi (1845–1858) presided over a diocesan synod from 15 to 17 April 1855.

On 14–15 October 1940, Bishop Oddo Bernacchia (1924–1960) held a diocesan synod.

=== New ecclesiastical province ===
Following the Second Vatican Council, and in accordance with the norms laid out in the council's decree, Christus Dominus chapter 40, Pope Paul VI ordered a reorganization of the ecclesiastical provinces in southern Italy. On 21 August 1976, he issued the decree "Ad apicem", creating the new ecclesiastical province entitled «Boianensis-Campobassensis», with its administrative center in Campobasso. The metropolitan archdiocese was assigned as suffragans the dioceses of Trivento (which had been immediately subject to the Holy See), Isernia e Venafro (which had been subject to the metropolitan archdiocese of Capua), and Termoli e Larino (which had been subject to the metropolitan archdiocese of Benevento.

=== Unification of dioceses of Termoli and Larino ===
On 18 February 1984, the Vatican and the Italian State signed a new and revised concordat. Based on the revisions, a set of Normae was issued on 15 November 1984, which was accompanied in the next year, on 3 June 1985, by enabling legislation. According to the agreement, the practice of having one bishop govern two separate dioceses at the same time, aeque personaliter, was abolished. The Vatican continued consultations which had begun under Pope John XXIII for the merging of small dioceses, especially those with personnel and financial problems, into one combined diocese.

On 30 September 1986, Pope John Paul II ordered that the dioceses of Termoli and Larino be merged into full union as one diocese with one bishop, with the Latin title Dioecesis Thermularum-Larinensis. The seat of the diocese was to be in Termoli, and the cathedral of Termoli was to serve as the cathedral of the merged diocese. The cathedral in Larino was to become a co-cathedral, and its cathedral Chapter was to be a Capitulum Concathedralis. There was to be only one diocesan Tribunal, in Termoli, and likewise one seminary, one College of Consultors, and one Priests' Council. The territory of the new diocese was to include the territory of the suppressed diocese of Larino.

In 1978, just before its suppression, the diocese of Larino claimed c. 53,400 Catholics, and 36 diocesan priests.

== Bishops ==
=== to 1500 ===
...

- Azo (attested 960)

...

- Joannes (attested 1061–1062)
- Guilelmus (attested 1070–1089)
- Rogerius (c. 1089)

...

- Joannes (attested 1100)

...

- Teodaldus (before 1166)
- Petrus (attested 1166–1182)

...

- Rainaldus (attested 1205)
- Matthaeus (attested c. 1218)
- Robertus (attested 1226–1227)
- Stephanus (attested 1240)
- Gualterius de Gualtieri (c. 1250–1254)
- Bartolommeo de Benevento, O.P. (1254–1264)
- ? Farulfus (c. 1267)
- Perronus (Perronius) (c. 1282–1309)
- Pasquale (1309– ? )
- Rao de Comestabulo (attested 1318)
- Joannes Andrea (attested 1338)
- Delfinus ( ? –1344)
- Andrea della Valleregia, O.Min. (1344–1365)
- Bertrand, O.P. (1365–1370)
- Sabinus (1370–1401)
- Petrus (1401–1410) Roman Obedience
- Rainaldus de Balinolo (1413–1418?)
- Joannes (attested 1418)
- Domenico de'Fontani (attested 1418)
- Filippo (attested 1427)
- Aurone (attested 1436)
- Joannes Leonis, O.P. (1440–1463)
- Antonio Giacobozzi de Misseri (1463– )

=== 1500 to 1800 ===
- Giacomo de' Petrucci, O.F.M. Obs. (1503–c. 1523?)
- Gian Francesco Cini
- Domenico Cini (1528–1530)
- Giacomo Sedati (1530–1535)
- Fernando de Mudarra (1535–1551)
- Gian Francesco Borengo (1551–1555 Resigned)
- Belisario Balduino (1555–1591)
- Gerolamo Vela (1591–1611)
- Giovanni Tommaso Eustachio, C.O. (9 Jan 1612–1616 Resigned)
- Gregorio Pomodoro (1616–1626 Died)
- Pietro Paolo Caputo (1628)

Sede vacante (1628 –1631)

- Persio Caracci (1631–1656 Resigned)
- Ferdinando Apicello (1656–1682 Died)
- Giambattista Quaranta (1683–1685 Died)
- Giuseppe Catalini (1686–1703 Died)
- Gregorio Compagni, O.P. (1703–1705 Died)
- Carlo Maria Pianetti (1706–1725 Died)
- Paolo Collia, O.M. (1725–1726)
- Giovanni Andrea Tria (1726–1741 Resigned)
- Giovanni Andrea Tria, (iuniore) (II) (1742–1747 Died)
- Scipione de' Lorenzi (1747–1772 Died)
- Giovanni Antonio Francisco de Nobili, Sch. P. (1772–1774 Died)
- Carlo d'Ambrosio (1775–1796 Died)

=== 1800 to 1986 ===
- Filippo Bandini (1798–1806?)

Sede vacante (1806?–1818)

- Raffaele Lupoli, C.SS.R. (1818–1827)
- Vincenzo Rocca (1829–1845 Died)
- Pietro Bottazzi (1845–1858)
- Francesco Giampaolo (1859–1888 Resigned)
- Vito Antonio Fioni (1888–1891 Resigned)
- Bernardino di Milia, O.F.M. Cap. (1891–1910 Died)
- Emidio Trenta (1910–1914 Appointed, Bishop of Viterbo e Tuscania)
- Antonio Lippolis (1915–1923 Appointed, Bishop of Ugento)
- Oddo Bernacchia (1924–1960 Retired)
- Costanzo Micci (1960–1966 Appointed, Apostolic Administrator of Fano)
- Pietro Santoro (1970–1979 Appointed, Archbishop of Boiano-Campobasso)
- Cosmo Francesco Ruppi (1980–1986 Appointed, Bishop of Termoli-Larino)

== Books ==
=== Reference works ===
- Gams, Pius Bonifatius (1873). Series episcoporum Ecclesiae catholicae (in Latin). Ratisbon: Typis et Sumptibus Georgii Josephi Manz. pp. 932–933.
- Eubel, Conradus, ed. (1913). Hierarchia catholica (in Latin). Vol. I (second ed.). Münster: Libreria Regensbergiana.
- Eubel, Conradus, ed. (1914). Hierarchia catholica (in Latin). Vol. II (second ed.). Münster: Libreria Regensbergiana.
- Eubel, Conradus; Gulik, Guilelmus (1923). Hierarchia catholica (in Latin). Vol. III (second ed.). Münster: Libreria Regensbergiana.
- Gauchat, Patritius (Patrice) (1935). Hierarchia catholica (in Latin). Vol. IV (1592-1667). Münster: Libraria Regensbergiana.
- Ritzler, Remigius; Sefrin, Pirminus (1952). Hierarchia catholica medii et recentis aevi (in Latin). Vol. V (1667-1730). Patavii: Messagero di S. Antonio.
- Ritzler, Remigius; Sefrin, Pirminus (1958). Hierarchia catholica medii et recentis aevi (in Latin). Vol. VI (1730-1799). Patavii: Messagero di S. Antonio.
- Ritzler, Remigius; Sefrin, Pirminus (1968). Hierarchia Catholica medii et recentioris aevi... (in Latin). Vol. VII (1800–1846). Monasterii: Libr. Regensburgiana.
- Remigius Ritzler; Pirminus Sefrin (1978). Hierarchia catholica Medii et recentioris aevi (in Latin). Vol. VIII (1846–1903). Il Messaggero di S. Antonio.
- Pięta, Zenon (2002). Hierarchia catholica medii et recentioris aevi... (in Latin). Vol. IX (1903-1922). Padua: Messagero di San Antonio. ISBN 978-88-250-1000-8.

=== Studies ===
- Cappelletti, Giuseppe (1864). Le chiese d'Italia: dalla loro origine sino ai nostri giorni (in Italian). Vol. XIX. Venezia: G. Antonelli. pp. 223–253.
- D'Avino, Vincenzo (1848). Cenni storici sulle chiese arcivescovili, vescovili, e prelatizie (nulluis) del Regno delle Due Sicilie (in Italian). Napoli: Ranucci. pp. 292–295. [article by Ottavio Sozio]
- A. De Francesco, A. (1909), "Origini e sviluppo del feudalismo nel Molise fino alia caduta della dominazione normanna: La contea longobarda di Larino," (in Italian) in: Archivio storico per le province napoletane, Volume 34 (1909) 656-671.
- Kehr, Paulus Fridolin (1962). Italia pontificia. Regesta pontificum Romanorum. Vol. IX: Samnia – Apulia – Lucania. Berlin: Weidmann. (in Latin). pp. 173–177.
- Klewitz, Hans-Walter (1933), Zur geschichte der bistums organization Campaniens und Apuliens im 10. und 11. Jahrhundert, (in German), in: Quellen und Forschungen aus italienischen Archiven und Bibliotheken, XXIV (1932–33), pp. 48–49.
- Lanzoni, Francesco (1927). Le diocesi d'Italia dalle origini al principio del secolo VII (an. 604). Faenza: F. Lega. (in Italian)
- Magliano, Alberto (1895). Larino: considerazioni storiche sulla città di Larino Volume 1. Campobasso: Colitti 1895.
- Tria, Giovanni Andrea (1744). Memorie storiche civili ed ecclesiastiche della città e diocesi di Larino, metropoli degli antichi Frentani. (in Italian). Romae: G. Zempel, 1744. [Gams, p. 889, remarks, "invenies series ep(iscoporum) minus accuratam."]
- Ughelli, Ferdinando; Coleti, Nicolaus (1721). Italia sacra, sive de episcopis Italiae, et insularum adjacentium (in Latin). Vol. Tomus octavus (8). Venezia: Apud Sebastianum Coleti. pp. 302–309.
