= Battle of Borgerhout =

1579 battle of the Eighty Years' War

- Part of the Eighty Years' War
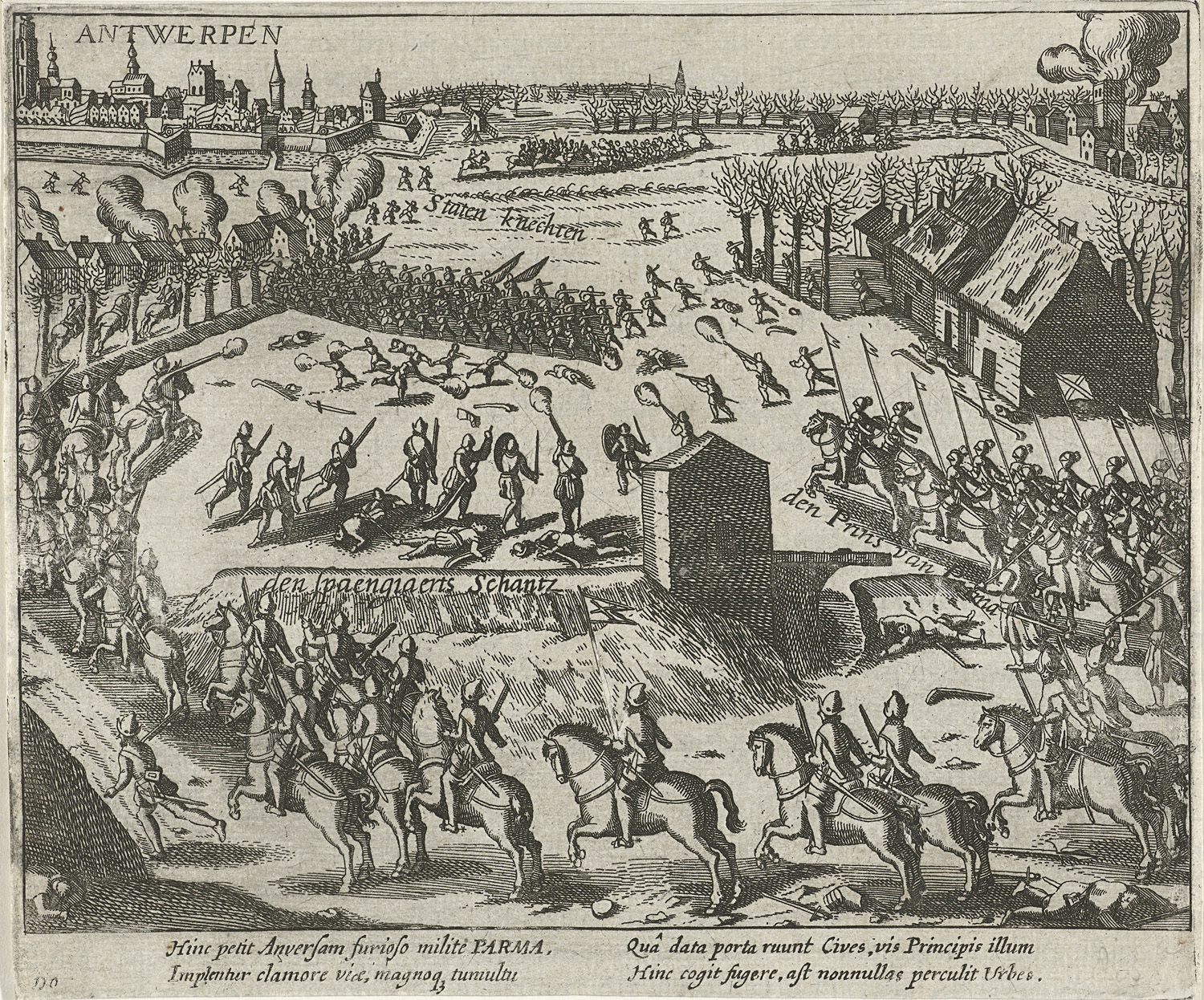
- Engraving of the Battle of Borgerhout by Frans Hogenberg, 1579–81.
Date	2 March 1579
Location	Borgerhout, Brabant (present day Antwerp, Belgium) 51.2133°N 4.4331°E
Result	Spanish victory

Belligerents
Spain	(Dutch Republic) States-General

Commanders and leaders
Alexander Farnese, Prince of Parma	François de la Noue; John Norreys

Strength
5,000 infantry and cavalry, 2 or 3 cannons	3,000–4,000 infantry, 100 cavalry, unknown artillery

Casualties and losses
Max. 500 killed	Max. 1,000 killed

The Battle of Borgerhout was a battle during the Eighty Years' War, of the Spanish Army of Flanders led by Alexander Farnese, Prince of Parma, upon a fortified camp at the village of Borgerhout, near Antwerp, where several thousand French, English, Scottish, and Walloon soldiers in service of the recently created Union of Utrecht were stationed. It took place during the reconquest by the armies of Philip II of Spain of the Burgundian Netherlands, whose different provinces had united in 1576 under the Pacification of Ghent to drive out the foreign troops and to grant religious liberty to Protestants.

Despite the rebel victory at the Battle of Rijmenam in July 1578, much of the Southern Netherlands were lost to the Spanish Army during the autumn; Brussels was menaced, and the States General were moved to the safer Antwerp. Taking advantage of the Dutch rebel army's indiscipline, Farnese decided at the beginning of 1579 to besiege Maastricht. As a feint to distract the Dutch rebels from his goal, but also aiming to scare Antwerp's inhabitants, Farnese moved with his troops to surprise the village of Borgerhout, very close to Antwerp, where a part of the Dutch States Army had its quarters, namely 3,000 or 4,000 infantry which were the backbone of the rebel army and consisted of French Calvinists under François de la Noue, and English and Scottish troops under John Norrey's orders.

On 2 March Farnese deployed elements of his army in a plain stretching between his position at the village of Ranst and the Dutch camp at Borgerhout, which Norreys and De la Noue had fortified with moats, palisades, and earthworks. The assault was divided into three columns, each one provided with a mobile bridge to pass over the camp's moat. After one of the attacks, undertaken by Walloon troops, succeeded in securing a bridge, the Spanish forces were able to attack the States-General's soldiers inside their camp. Norreys and De la Noue's men opposed a strong defence, but Farnese, throwing his light cavalry into the battle, forced the Dutch troops to abandon Borgerhout and look for shelter under the artillery of Antwerp's walls. William of Orange, leader of the Dutch revolt, and Archduke Matthias of Habsburg, Governor-General of the Netherlands appointed by the States General, witnessed the fight from Antwerp's walls.

The battle meant the destruction of the villages of Borgerhout and Deurne and saw up to 1,500 men killed between both armies. Farnese then proceeded to besiege Maastricht, which the Spanish Army invested less than a week after the battle and was taken by assault on 29 June of the same year. Farnese's successful campaign opened the way to a nine-year period of Spanish reconquest of much of the Netherlands.

== Background ==
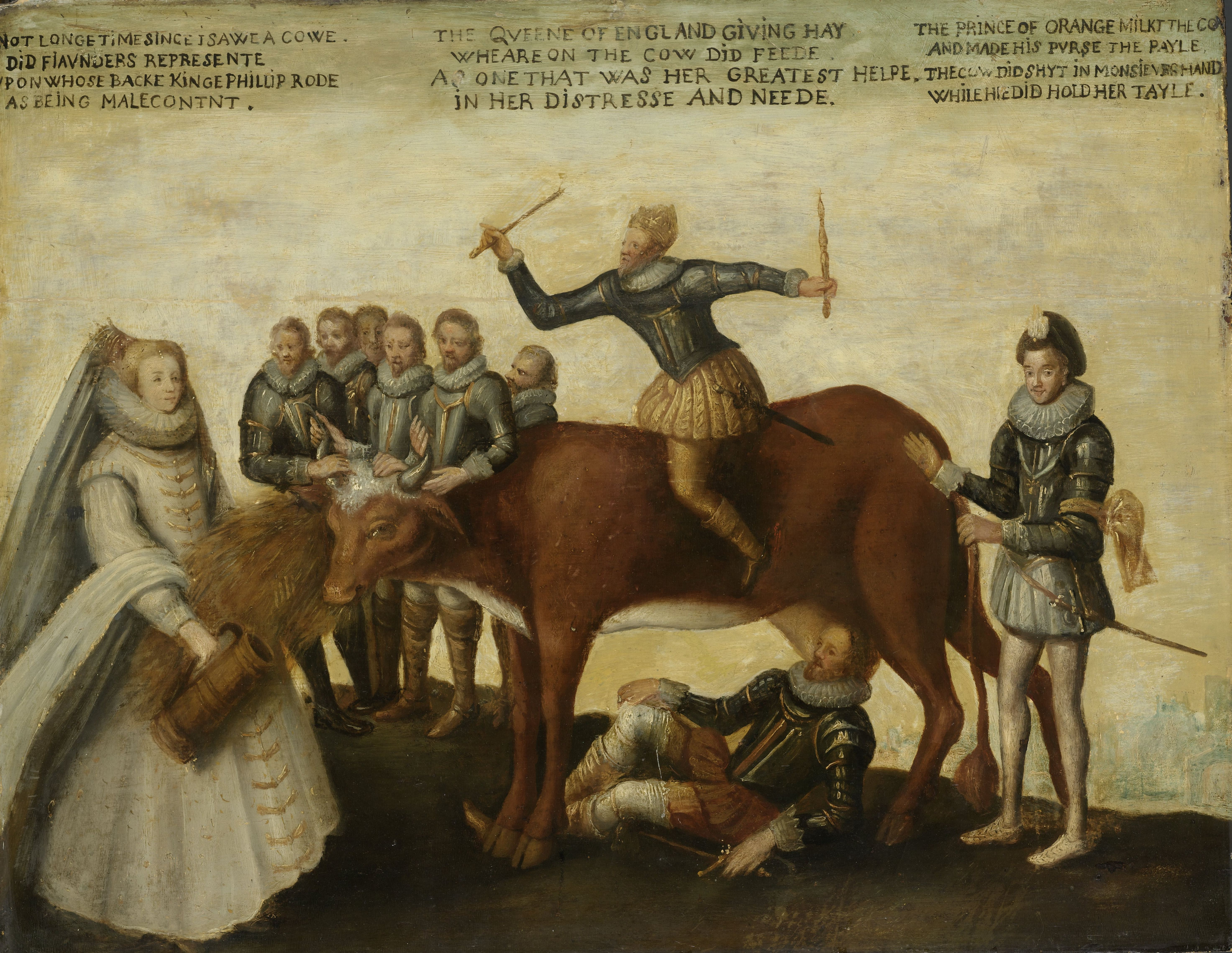
The Dairy Cow, an English anonymous painting that depicts Philip II, William of Orange, Elizabeth I, and the Duke of Anjou fighting over the Netherlands, which are embodied in a cow (c. 1585). Rijksmuseum Amsterdam.

In 1566 the Burgundian Netherlands, Charles V of Habsburg's original realm, which had passed to his son Philip II of Spain on his abdication in 1556, were in disarray due to religious tensions between Protestants and Catholics and the nobility and cities' unwillingness of funding Philip's wars and ceding its powers to the Royal administration. In 1567, Philip sent an army to the Netherlands under Fernando Álvarez de Toledo, Duke of Alba, to restore his authority, but Alba's persecution of the religious and political dissenters led William of Orange, the leader of the nobility, to exile into Germany and prepare an invasion of the Netherlands to expel Alba.

Orange invaded the Netherlands twice, in 1568 and 1572, but in both occasions Alba defeated him. The second time, however, the revolt spread into the provinces of Holland and Zealand, and Alba was unable to quell it. In 1576, the lack of an authority due to the death of Alba's successor Luis de Requesens, together with a Spanish general bankruptcy, led the Spanish mutinous soldiers to sack several towns, including Antwerp. In reaction, the loyal and rebel provinces united to expel the foreign troops under the Pacification of Ghent.

John of Austria, the victor of Lepanto and replacement to Requesens, had no choice but to sign the Perpetual Edict in 1577, accepting the Pacification of Ghent, but later, frustrated by the intransigence of Orange and his supporters, he seized the citadel of Namur and recalled his troops. John's striking victory at the Battle of Gembloux in January 1578, was followed by a tactical defeat at Rijmenam in July, and John himself died of plague in October. However, despite the Spanish failure to exploit militarily the victory of Gembloux, it rendered important political benefits to the royal cause in the Netherlands, as it shattered the unity of the Dutch rebels. As a consequence of the battle's outcome, the leaders of the main families of the Southern provinces lost faith in Orange's cause and the promises of aid made by the English queen Elizabeth I, which meant an important setback to Orange. Aiming to restore the military capability of the Dutch rebels, Elizabeth arranged with John Casimir, son of the Calvinist Elector Palatine, the raising of a German Army under English pay to assist the Dutch troops. John Casimir brought to the Netherlands 11,000 men, but instead of fighting the Spanish, he sided with the Calvinist extremists at Ghent and widened the gap between the Catholic and Protestant rebels. The States General also called for help from Francis, Duke of Anjou, brother and heir to the King of France, who entered Mons in July 1578, but was back in France in a short time.

The Catholic nobility and southern provinces' defections, already started in the autumn 1578, expanded further when the provinces of Hainaut and Artois on 6 January 1579 concluded the Union of Arras, which Walloon Flanders would soon join. The Catholic provinces of Namur, Luxembourg, and Limburg were already controlled by the Spanish. The Union of Arras opened talks in February with Alexander Farnese, who succeeded his uncle John of Austria as the Royal-appointed Governor-General of the Netherlands, to reconcile with Philip II. In response, a meeting took place in Utrecht shortly thereafter between deputies from the northern provinces of Holland, Zealand, Utrecht, Friesland, Gelderland, and Ommelanden, which signed an alliance and union on 23 January. In the south, meanwhile, Farnese was planning the capture of Maastricht to use the city with its stone bridge over the Meuse as a base to conquer Brussels and Antwerp in the following campaigns. In November 1578, the Spanish Army left Namur and crossed the Ardennes and Limburg. However, Farnese deemed too risky starting the siege of Maastrich at midwinter and with John Casimir's numerous cavalry in the countryside.

== Campaign ==
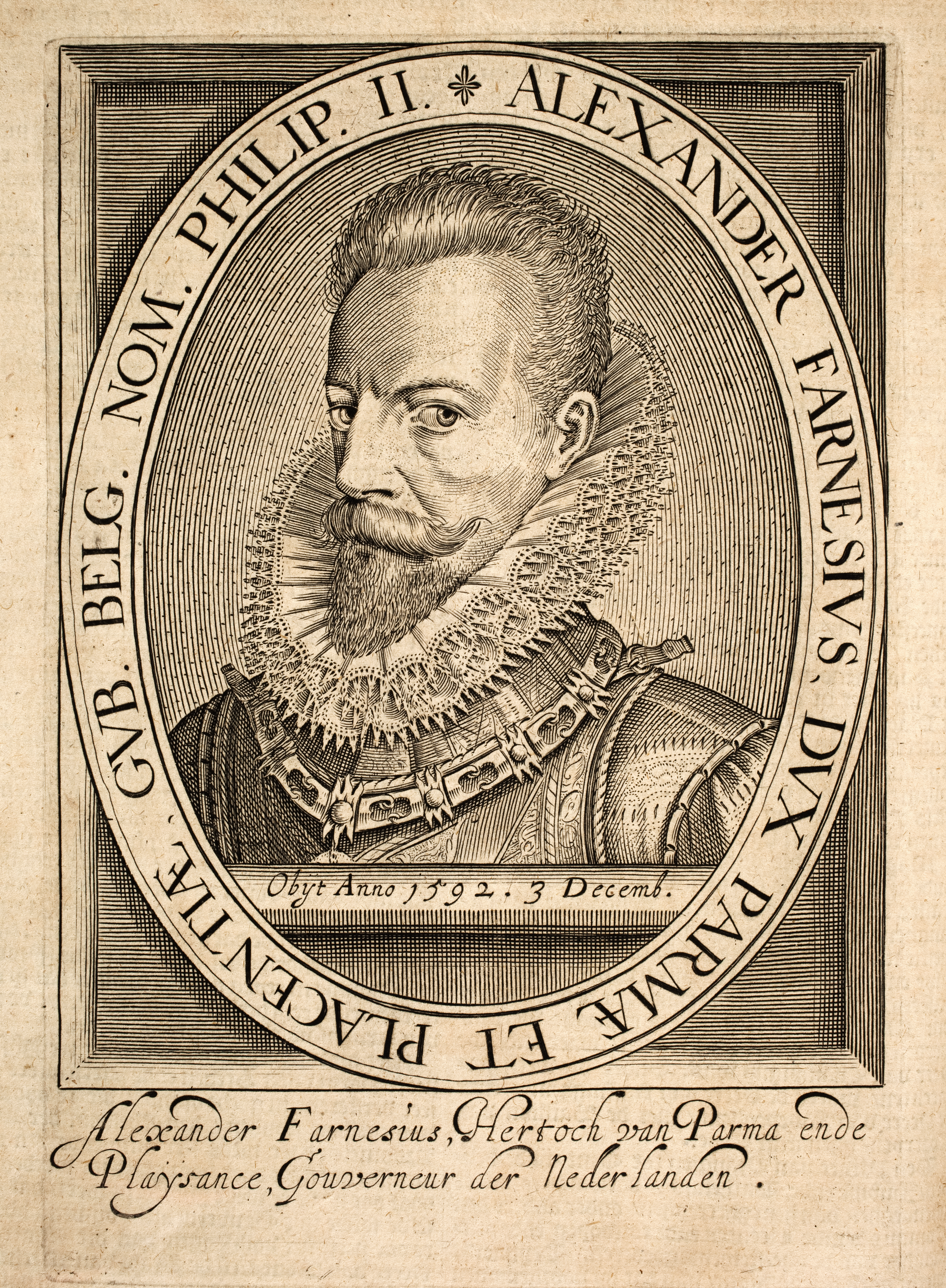
Engraving of Alexander Farnese by Emanuel van Meteren. Peace Palace Library.

For the 1579 campaign, Farnese planned two different movements. A portion of his army, under Cristóbal de Mondragón, was to clear the area between Maastricht and the German border of Dutch garrisons, while Farnese himself, ahead of the main army, decided to move against Antwerp with two objectives: to neutralize the Dutch field army, or primarily its German cavalry, before laying siege to Maastricht and to distract the Dutch from the campaign's real objective. The first part of the plan was accomplished when Mondragón took the towns of Kerpen, Erkelenz, and Straelen between 7 and 15 January. On 24 January, Farnese moved to attack the States General army, which was at Weert, east of Antwerp. Outnumbered, François de la Noue, who had taken the role of field commander of the States' army after the Count of Bossu's death, left some States' troops in the Castle of Weert and withdrew to Antwerp with his unpaid men. They asked the city council to allow them to enter the city, but it was refused, and De la Noue had no choice but to entrench his army outside the walls, in the village of Borgerhout. This was a residential area for the wealthy inhabitants of Antwerp where they had country houses and gardens, among them Peeter van Coudenberghe's botanical garden, which had more than 600 exotic plants.

In the meantime, Farnese entrusted to Count Hannibal d'Altemps the capture of Weert and continued his advance upon the Dutch Army. D'Altemps encircled Weert with 6,000 men and breached its walls with a two-cannon battery. The defenders of the castle surrendered at discretion but, on Farnese orders, were hanged from the windows, which the Count willingly did because his steward had lost an eye during the siege. Farnese, instead of following the Dutch Army to its quarters, lodged in Turnhout with his troops and his court to forage. Before moving to Antwerp he dealt with John Casimir's German army. Spanish troops attacked and defeated part of the German reiters near Eindhoven on 10 February. Moreover, while John Casimir himself was in England dealing with Elizabeth I, Farnese agreed with his lieutenant, Maurice of Saxe-Lauenburg, the withdrawal of the Calvinist army, which the Spaniards allowed to leave the Netherlands freely. Once this matter was finished, Farnese advanced upon Borgerhout.

== Order of battle ==
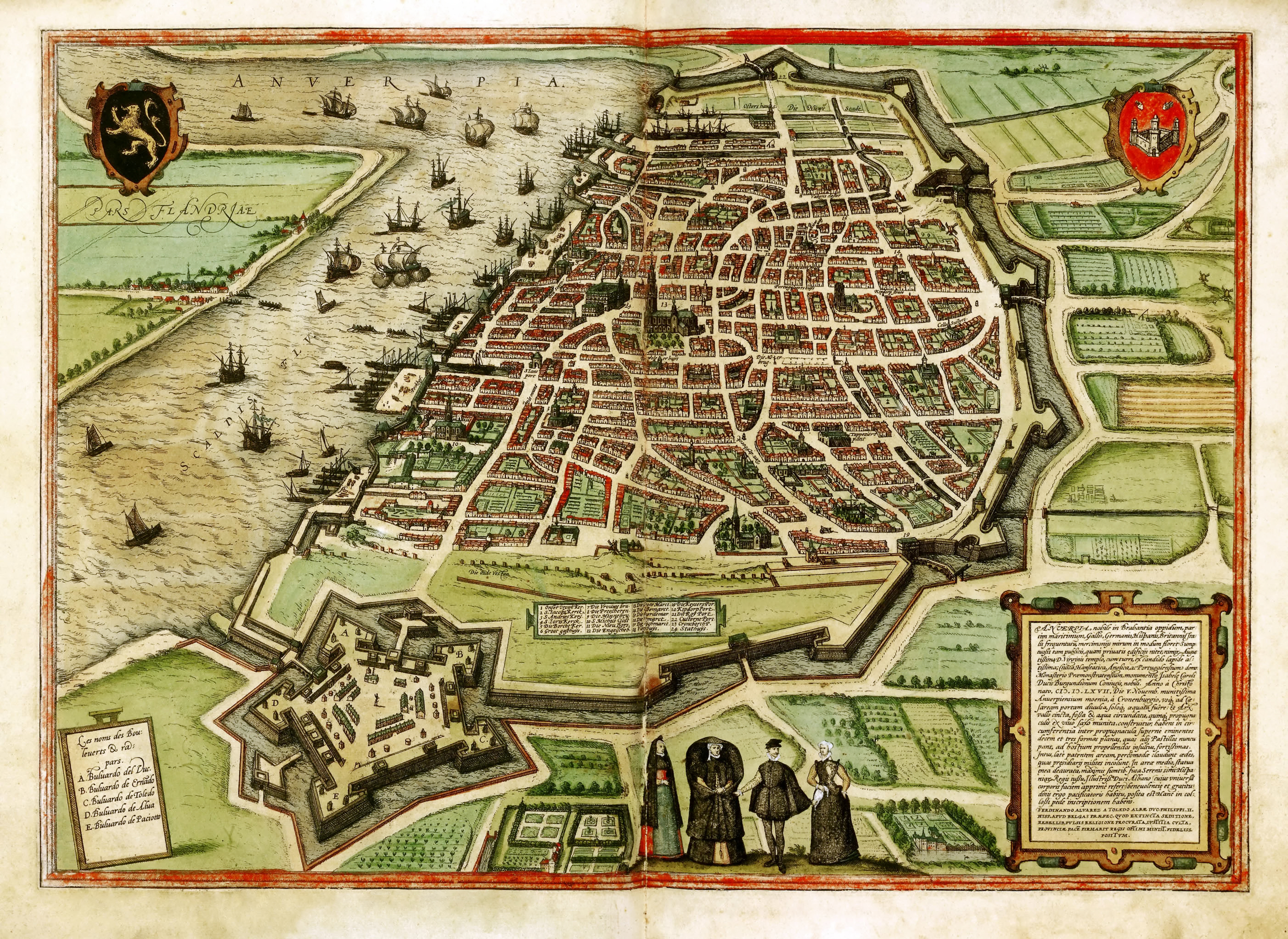
Map of Antwerp with its defenses by Georg Braun and Frans Hogenberg, c. 1572–79

The Dutch States' troops quartered in the village of Borgerhout numbered 25 or 40 infantry companies which comprised from 3,000 to 4,000 soldiers, plus 100 additional mounted troops. They were the backbone of the rebel army and William of Orange referred to them as "his braves". Moreover, they were led by officers of renown such as François de la Noue and John Norreys. To confront the Spanish Army, they were detached along the village of Borgerhout, which they had fortified by digging a moat and building an earth rampart around the village, from the bridge of Deurne over the Groot Schijn stream, which flowed into the Scheldt, to the road of Voetweg, which ran parallel to the canal of Herentals.

Orange deployed four additional French infantry regiments and Walloon troops from the nearby garrisons of Ath and Termonde behind Borgerhout and under the protection of Antwerp's citadel and moat. The city's civic guard, numbering 80 flags of armed and trained burghers, was ready to defend the city if necessary, but not willing to go out to join the battle nor to allow the regular troops to come within Antwerp. The Spanish soldier and chronicler Alonso Vázquez claimed that Orange's army had, in all, 25,000 men. Farnese deployed a 5,000-man vanguard, both infantry and cavalry, in the plain which separated his camp at Ranst from Borgerhout. Three small battalions, not surpassing 12 companies each, but made up of chosen men, went in advance; the right was taken by the Spanish tercio of Lope de Figueroa, the center by a Lower German regiment under Francisco de Valdés, and the right by a Walloon regiment under Claude de Berlaymont, known as Haultpenne.

Each formation was supported by a sleeve of 100 musketeers, a group of men armed with axes to cut the palisades and a wheeled bridge to cross the moat. A corps of light cavalry led by Antonio de Olivera followed the infantry at some distance with instructions to cover its withdrawal if the attack went bad, or to follow up the victory, if it took place. According to Alonso Vázquez, Farnese made the Walloon soldiers of the Spanish army wear white shirts over their armor, a practise common in night attacks known as camisades, to distinguish themselves from the Walloons who fought for the Union of Utrecht. Thus the Walloons looked, in his words, like "a very colorful procession of clerics and sacristans".

In reserve, Farnese deployed a large battalion made up by the German regiments of Hannibal d'Altemps and Georg von Frundsberg, flanked on its right by troops of reiters under Duke Francis of Saxe-Lauenburg, elder brother of Duke Maurice, John Casimir's former lieutenant, and on its left by lancers under Pierre de Taxis. The remaining Spanish cavalry, led by Ottavio Gonzaga, covered the rear. Farnese led his troops personally, and before the battle was started, he scouted the Dutch position, having ordered his troops not to move until his return. On the Dutch side, while De la Noue and Norreys directed the men standing in Borgerhout, William of Orange witnessed the battle from the walls of Antwerp in company of Archduke Matthias, brother of the Holy Roman Emperor Rudolf II, whom the States General had elected as Governor of the Netherlands in opposition to the deceased John of Austria.

== Battle ==
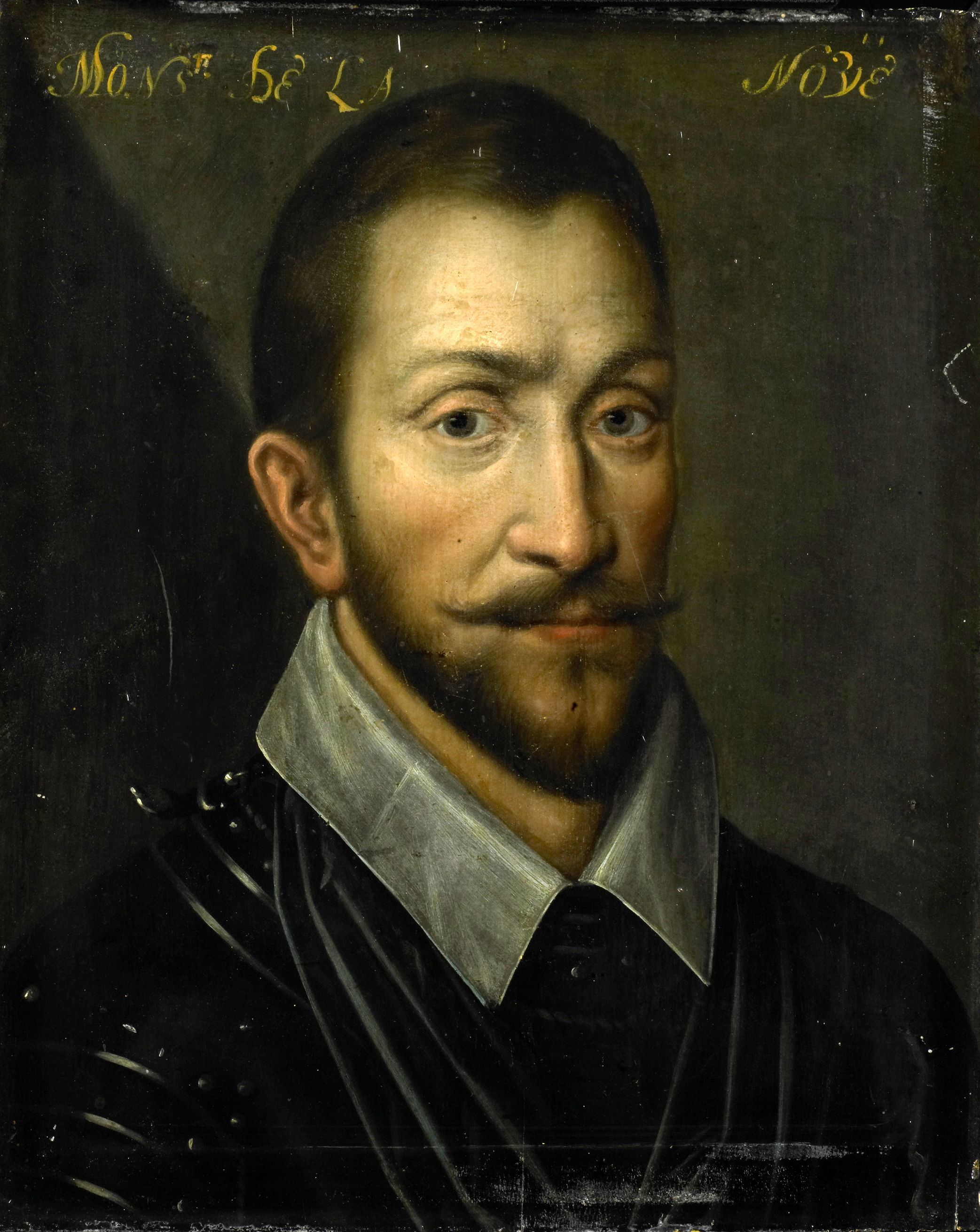
Anonymous portrait of François de la Noue, c. 1609–33. Rijksmuseum Amsterdam.

The fight started with the three battalions of the Spanish first line advancing upon the Dutch camp, each one trying to be the first to lay its bridge over the moat. Haultpenne's Walloons, headed by Sergeant-Major Camille Sacchino, moved up to Deurne, crossing the Schijn river at the small village of Immerseel. Valdés' Germans advanced frontally to Borgerhout across the Borsbeek road, and Figueroa's Spaniards took the Voetweg road to assault the Dutch camp from the south. While the sleeves of musketeers from the Spanish and German units exchanged fire with the Dutch troops covered by the rampart, Sacchino's Walloons drove the defenders of Deurne behind the Groot Schijn stream and took its bridge.

De la Noue sent reinforcements there to contest the assault, but they arrived too late to prevent the Walloons from laying their bridge over the moat and began to climb the rampart, starting a close combat with the Dutch troops. In the meantime, the Spanish and German troops, supported by two or three artillery pieces, breached the rampart, crossed the moat, and also started to come inside Borgerhout, where De la Noue and Norreys' men reorganized and stood on the barricaded streets. Farnese, seeing that his attack was going well, ordered Olivera to advance with his cavalry to support the infantry's push. While the light horsemen penetrated into Borgerhout across the breach opened by Figueroa's men, Farnese himself took the command of Taxis' lancers and did the same across Valdés' path. The French and English soldiers offered a strong resistance, but after two hours of battle inside the quarters, De la Noue began to withdraw his forces to Antwerp to avoid destruction.

The retreating troops set fire to their lodgements and looked for shelter under the coverage of Antwerp's artillery. Many of the Spanish soldiers went in pursuit, despite their officers’ orders for them to stay together, and chased the rebels until Antwerp's moat. At William of Orange's orders, the artillery of the city walls fired shrapnel over the Spanish troops with different results, depending on the sources. The Spanish soldier Alonso Vázquez claimed that the shots were ineffective because the battlefield was covered by the smoke produced by the fire of Borgerhout. On the other hand, the Flemish official Guillaume Baudart claimed that it was precise and made "arms and legs fly on the air".

By then, Farnese, unwilling of having for a longer time his troops close to Antwerp's cannons, made drums and trumpets to call for withdrawal and gathered his men at Borgerhout. Meanwhile, people from Antwerp sallied to carry the wounded French, British, and Walloon officers and soldiers into the city to receive treatment. The Spanish soldiery, once the fire of Borgerhout was finished, looted the basements of the burned buildings and had a meal before praying to thank God. After that, the Spanish army marched across the roads of Lier and Herentals to Turnhout, where Farnese wanted to arrive the next day. Fearing a new attack, Antwerp's civic guards spent the night at their posts.

== Aftermath ==
Political map of the Netherlands in 1579 with the Spanish campaign and the main actions signaled.

The number of casualties endured by both armies differs according to the authors. The Italian Jesuit Famiano Strada noted that Farnese, in a letter to his father Ottavio, Duke of Parma, put the Dutch loss as 600 men killed and gave eight men killed and 40 wounded amongst his troops. Strada also mentions that other estimations pointed to 1,040 men killed in the Dutch ranks. On the other hand, the Flemish author Guillaume Baudart set the Dutch loss as 200 men killed and claimed that the Spanish army lost 500 men. The villages of Deurne and Borgerhout were seriously damaged by the fire during the battle: in 1580 Deurne had 133 standing buildings, while 146 had been destroyed by the fire; in Borgerhout 206 buildings remained and 280 were ruined.

Farnese's attack achieved his goal of distracting the Dutch States forces from Maastricht. After the battle, the Spanish army moved quickly to Turnhout, taking the castle of Grobbendonk on its way and appearing before Maastricht on 8 March, just six days after the battle of Borgerhout. François de la Noue followed the Spanish till Herentals with some troops, but when he realized that Farnese was to lay siege to Maastricht, it was too late for him to reinforce the city's garrison. Moreover, mutinies and defections hampered the Dutch efforts to save the city. The English soldiers under John Norrey's orders, who remained out of Antwerp, kidnapped the abbot of St. Michael's Abbey in demand for back pays, and William of Orange's had to mediate to placate them. In political terms, the battle increased the Walloon defections from the States General to the Spanish party in the following months. Emanuel Philibert de Lalaing joined the Spanish Army with 5,000 Walloon troops of the Dutch States army and expelled from Menen a garrison loyal to the States General.

Farnese besieged Maastricht in command of 15,000 infantry, 4,000 cavalry, 20 cannons, and 4,000 sappers, joined later by 5,000 additional troops. In May, while the siege developed, peace talks were held at Cologne under the mediation of the Holy Roman Emperor Rudolf to preserve the unity of the Netherlands. However, divisions become more serious during the process. In Brussels, fight erupted in early June between Catholics headed by Philip of Egmont, son of Lamoral of Egmont, whom the Royalist authorities had executed in 1568 and Calvinists under Olivier van den Tympel, resulting in the expulsion of Egmont and his supporters. At Mechelen, the Catholic inhabitants forced the Dutch garrison to leave, while in 's-Hertogenbosch an armed struggle resulted in the magistrates declaring support to the Royalist side. The revolt took a character of civil war, and as a result of the religious problem, the peace conference at Cologne failed. Henceforth, Farnese reconquered Flanders and the Brabant town after town, even forcing Antwerp to surrender after a long and exhausting siege in 1585.
