= Weerts =

Weerts may refer to:

- Eva-Maria Weerts, German film producer
- Jean-Joseph Weerts (1 May 1846 – 28 September 1927), French painter of Belgian origin

== See also ==
- Wert
- Weert (disambiguation)
