= Siege of Caudebec =

1592 siege of the French Wars of Religion

- Part of the French Wars of Religion and the Anglo–Spanish War
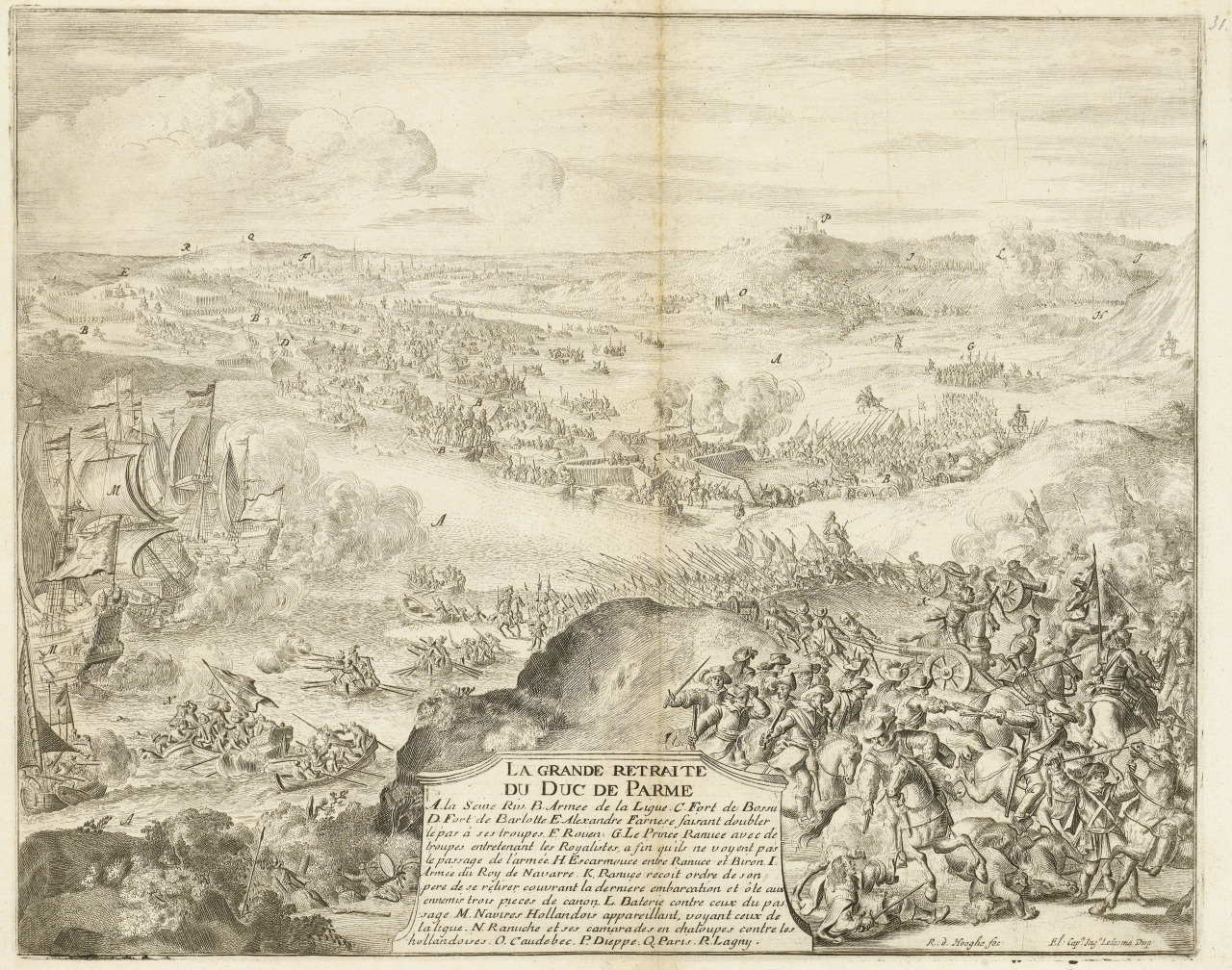
- Retreat of the army of the Duke of Parma into Flanders in May of 1592; Rijksmuseum
Date	Early May – 23 May 1592
Location	Caudebec-en-Caux (Seine-Maritime), France 49°31′38″N 0°43′37″E
Result	Royalist victory

Belligerents
(Kingdom of France) French Crown; England; Dutch Republic	(Spain) Spanish Empire; Catholic League

Commanders and leaders
(Kingdom of France) Henry IV of France	(Spain) Duke of Parma; Duke of Mayenne

Strength
25,000	15,000

Casualties and losses
Unknown	Heavy
- Location within France

The siege of Caudebec (French: Retraite du Duc de Parme) was a military event that took place between early May and 23 May 1592 as part of the French Wars of Religion and the Anglo-Spanish War (1585–1604). The Spanish and the French Catholic League forces of Duke of Parma had captured the town of Caudebec on the Seine, where they soon found themselves trapped by the reinforced Royalist Protestant army led by Henry of Navarre consisting of French, English, and Dutch troops. Seeing that Henry's force had now surrounded him, Parma seeing that defeat was inevitable, pulled his 15,000 men across the river in a single night to escape and retreat to the south.

== Background ==
The Catholic forces of the Duke of Parma had relieved Rouen in April 1592 and had skilfully avoided an engagement with Henry of Navarre's Protestant army. After having entered Rouen, Parma then marched west and towards Caudebec on the Seine in the Pays de Caux, a town blocking the road to the important route to the port of Le Havre. Henry's army at the same time had been weakened by disease and desertions to the Catholic League, and needed to halt for supplies. Once this had been done, Henry was reinforced by the Duke of Montpensier, who had just secured Western Normandy with the capture of Avranches, and with this both men were now ready to take to the field again. The army of Henry numbering in all 25,000 men included a large English contingent of 7,000 men, 3,000 Dutch, and included a large cavalry force, nearly all French. In addition, the sea lane towards the Seine was operated and controlled by several Dutch warships in support of Henry's forces.

Parma's force took Caudebec with ease and thus set about improving the town's defences.

== Siege ==
Parma desired to keep the Seine open for supplies and for the ferrying of his troops. Henry saw the opportunity in Parma's strategic blunder. This allowed the Spanish forces to be drawn into a narrow triangle between the sea and river where the Dutch ships were present. Henry had obtained control of the Seine both above and below Caudebec, holding Pont de l'Arche, the last bridge across the river between Rouen and Caudebec.

On Henry's approach to the town, the Catholic forces prepared for a siege, but within a few days and with overwhelming numbers, the League outerworks were easily overwhelmed, leaving the town exposed. During this time, Parma received a wound in the arm under the shoulder whilst visiting a gun emplacement; the Duke of Mayenne took control while Parma convalesced. Every passage was then occupied and strengthened by the King, fierce skirmishes took place everyday, but at length Henry saw all his operations successful, and the army of the League was shut in between the river and the sea.

Crucially, on the third day, Henry's force succeeded in cutting off and forcing the surrender of a leaguer division of light cavalry quartered nearby. A large quantity of baggage, food, plate, and money fell into the hands of the King's men, thus worsening a difficult situation for Parma's men, who were already in want of provisions.

Parma was in a hopeless situation - to cross the river was the only means of retreat; and although Mayenne and the most experienced officers in the army pronounced it impracticable, Parma resolved to attempt a retreat.

=== Parma's escape ===
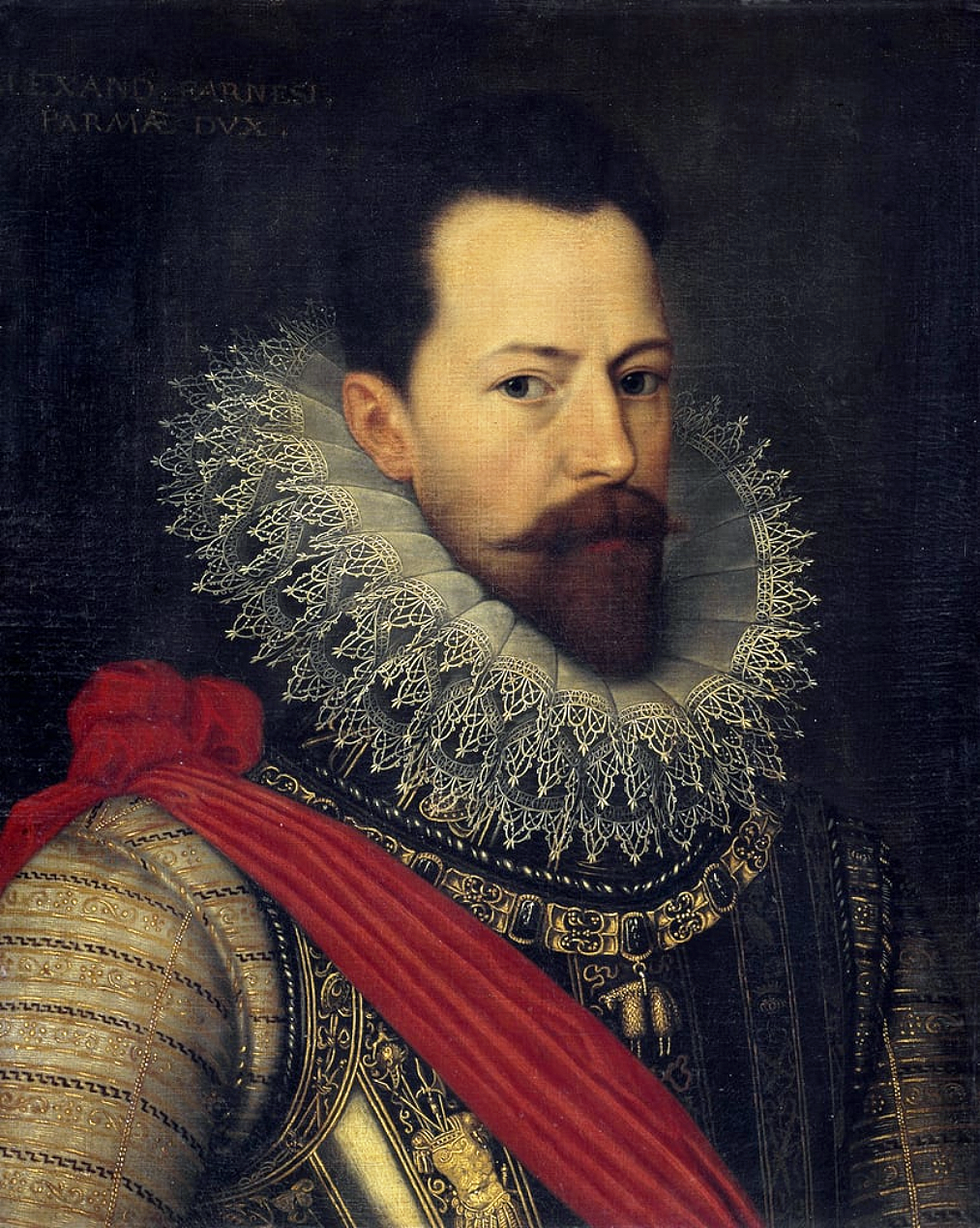
The Duke of Parma portrayed by Otto van Veen

Parma ordered a redoubt thrown up on the closest margin of the river. On the opposite bank, he constructed another, and planted artillery with a force of eight hundred Flemish soldiers under the Count of Bossu in the one and an equal number of Walloons in the other. He collected all the flatboats, ferries, and rafts that could be found there and at Rouen. Then, under the cover of his forts, he transported all the Flemish infantry and the Spanish, French, and Italian cavalry during the night of 21 May to the opposite bank of the Seine. At the same time, batteries were erected along the banks to keep off the Dutch fleet. The next morning, he sent up all the artillery together with the Flemish cavalry to Rouen, making use of what he could of the broken arches of the destroyed bridge in order to shorten the distance from shore to shore. With this he managed to convey his whole army with all its trains across the river. A force was left behind up to the last moment to engage in skirmishes and to display themselves as largely as possible for the purpose of distracting the King's force. The young Prince of Parma, Ranuccio I Farnese, Duke of Parma, had command of this rearguard and the escape was successful.

The news of this operation was not brought to Henry's attention until after it had been accomplished. When the king reached the shore of the Seine he saw that the rearguard of the army including the garrison of the fort on the right bank were just ferrying themselves across under command of Ranuccio. Shocked by this, Henry quickly ordered artillery to bear upon the withdrawing soldiers, but the bombardment was largely ineffective and the Catholic Spanish force took up their line of march to the south. Henry then constructed a bridge over the Pont de l'Arche and his first objective was to pursue with his cavalry, but it was too late; the infantry would not have been able to support them in time.

== Aftermath ==
Parma's withdrawal was complete, but he had to abandon his transport with the sick and wounded. Having escaped from Henry's army, Parma's force then marched eastward at speed, reaching Saint Cloud within five days. The Duke afterwards reinforced the garrison in Paris before returning to Flanders.

Even though Henry had been fooled by Parma, the victory did lay with him strategically since Parma had retreated before him and Caudebec was back in the hands of the King. At the same time, Henry's opportunity to destroy the Spanish and Catholic army had been missed. Parma had escaped to Flanders, but the Spanish court's view of his retreat meant that he had fallen foul of them and was removed from the position as governor. On 2 December, Parma died at Arras, the wound from the battle having proved fatal.

A League and Spanish force defeated an Anglo-Royal army at Craon on 21 May, but elsewhere they were less successful. By Winter of that year Henry gave up campaigning, but for him at least and the Protestant army Parma was no longer a serious threat. In December Henry disbanded his army but was no closer to recapturing his kingdom.

== Bibliography ==
- Alan, James (2004). The Navy and Government in Early Modern France, 1572–1661. Suffolk, UK: Woodbridge. ISBN 0-86193-270-6.
- Baumgartner, Frederic J. (1991). From Spear to Flintlock: A History of War in Europe and the Middle East to the French Revolution. Praeger. ISBN 9780275939557.
- Lovett, A. W. (1986). Early Habsburg Spain, 1517–1598. Oxford University Press. ISBN 9780198221395.
- Jaques, Tony (2006). Dictionary of Battles and Sieges: A Guide to 8500 Battles from Antiquity Through the Twenty-first Century. Greenwood Publishing Group. ISBN 978-0313335365.
- James, George Payne Rainsford (1999). The Life of Henry the Fourth, King of France and Navarre. Adegi Graphics. ISBN 9781402189463.
- Knecht, Robert J. (2014). The French Religious Wars 1562–1598. Osprey Publishing. ISBN 9781472810137.
- Sutherland, Nicola Mary (2002). Henry IV of France and the Politics of Religion: The path to Rome. Intellect Books. ISBN 9781841507026.
- Keegan, John (2014). Wheatcroft, Andrew (ed.). Who's Who in Military History: From 1453 to the Present Day. Routledge. ISBN 9781136414169.
