= Weert, Belgium =

Weert, Belgium may refer to:

- Weert, Antwerp, Belgium
- Weert, Limburg, Belgium
