= Siege of Rouen (1591–1592) =

Siege in Rouen, France in 1591

- Part of the French War of Religion (1587–1594) and the Anglo–Spanish War
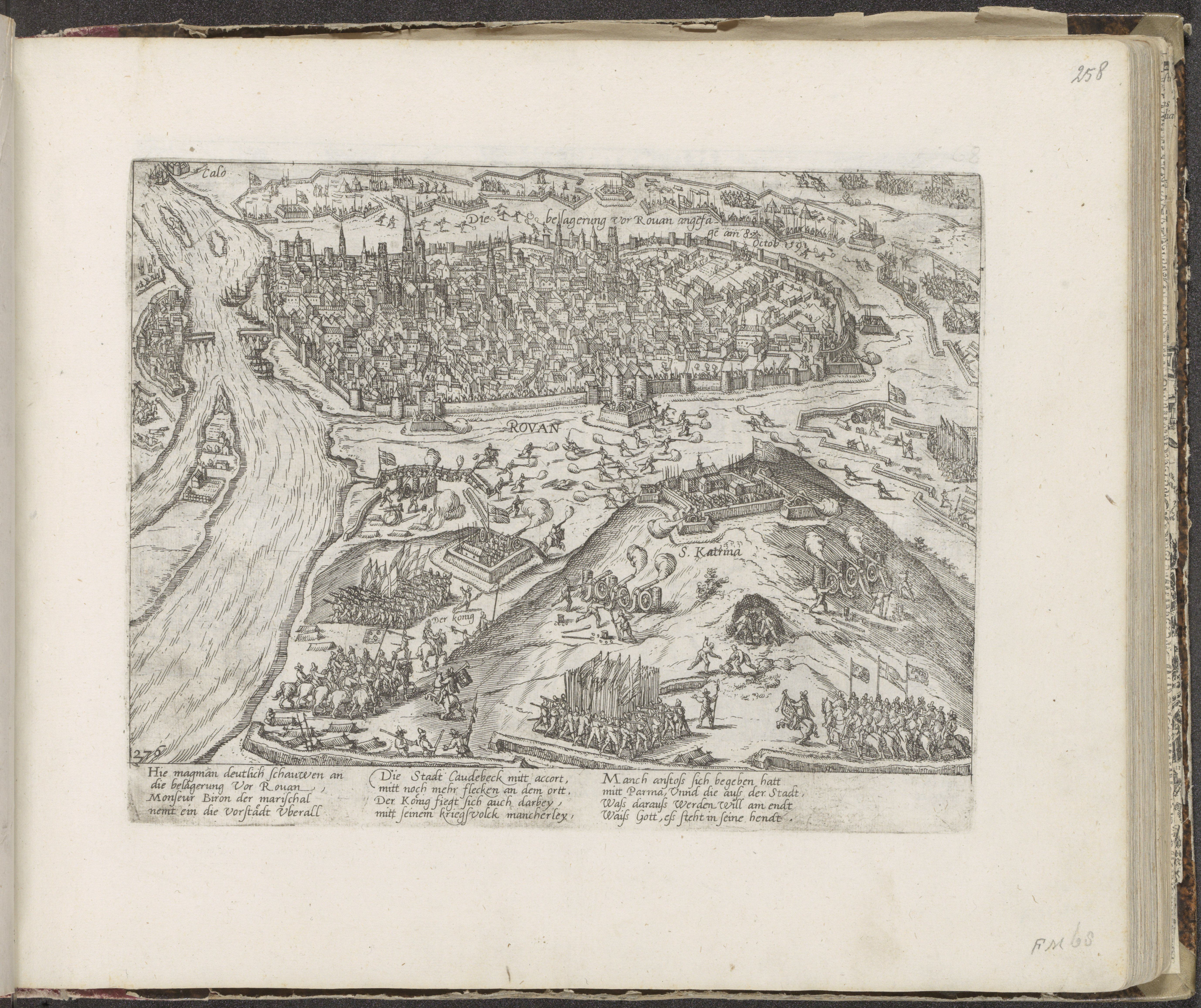
- Beginning of the siege of Rouen on 8 October 1591
Date	11 November 1591 – 20 April 1592
Location	Rouen, Normandy, Kingdom of France (present-day Upper Normandy, France) 49.4428°N 1.0886°E
Result	Spanish-Catholic victory

Belligerents
Kingdom of England; Dutch Republic	Catholic League; Army of Flanders

Commanders and leaders
Henry of Navarre; Baron de Biron; Robert Devereux	André de Brancas; Duke of Parma; Carlos Coloma; Giorgio Basta

The siege of Rouen was an unsuccessful attempt by Henry IV of France to capture Rouen, the historical capital city of Normandy. The battle took place as part of the French Wars of Religion, the Eighty Years' War, and the Anglo–Spanish War (1585–1604). Although he had claimed the throne in 1589, Henry, a Huguenot, was not recognized by many of his Catholic subjects. He was forced to fight against a Catholic League determined to resist his rule, and which was aided by Spain.

The siege began on 11 November 1591 with Robert Devereux, 2nd Earl of Essex confronting the town's governor, André de Brancas, Seigneur de Villars, "with the sort of chivalric gesture which still was made on Europe's battlefields" and "challenged Villars to meet him in individual combat."

At Rouen, the combined French, English, and Dutch forces of Henry IV battled the troops of the Catholic League, commanded by Villars, and the Spanish forces led by Don Alexander Farnese, Duke of Parma. The city resisted until the arrival of the Spanish troops, which defeated and forced the Protestant forces to lift the siege. As historian John Lothrop Motley described the abandonment, "Henry did not wait for the attack. He had changed his plan, and, for once in his life, substituted extreme caution for his constitutional temerity. Neither awaiting the assault upon his entrenchments nor seeking his enemy in the open field, he ordered the whole camp to be broken up, and on the 20th of April, raised the siege."

== See also ==
- Siege of Paris (1590)
- Battle of Craon
- War of the Three Henrys
- Eighty Years' War
- French Wars of Religion

== Bibliography ==
- James, Alan. The Navy and Government in Early Modern France, 1572–1661. First published 2004. Woodbridge, Suffolk, UK. ISBN 0-86193-270-6
- Janel Mueller/Joshua Scodel. Elizabeth I: Translations, 1592–1598. The University of Chicago.
