= Weert (disambiguation) =

Weert may refer to:

- Weert, Netherlands
- Weert, Antwerp, Belgium
- Weert, Belgian Limburg, Belgium
