= Capture of Aalst (1584) =

1584 siege in Belgium

- Part of the Eighty Years' War
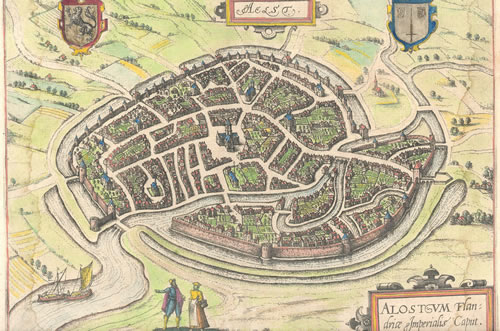
- Map of the city of Aalst in 1581.
Date	Early February, 1584
Location	Aalst, County of Aalst, Flanders (present-day Belgium)
Result	Spanish victory

Belligerents
(Dutch Republic) States-General	Spain

Commanders and leaders
Unknown	(Spain) Alexander Farnese

The Capture of Aalst of 1584, also known as the Betrayal of Aalst, took place in early February, 1584, at Aalst, County of Aalst, Flanders (present-day Belgium), during the Eighty Years' War. In 1584, after the successful Spanish military campaign of 1583, the Governor-General Don Alexander Farnese, Prince of Parma, was focused in subjecting by hunger the cities located on the Scheldt and its tributaries. One of these cities was Aalst, located on the Dender river. In January, the garrison of Aalst, composed of English troops under the command of Governor Olivier van den Tympel, was surrounded and blocked by the Spanish forces led by Parma. In this situation, the English soldiers, tired of the lack of supplies and pay, finally surrendered the city to Parma, in exchange for 128,250 florins and entered the service of the Spanish army.

The advance of the Prince of Parma was unstoppable, and on April 7, after three months of siege, the city of Ypres surrendered. The next goal of the Spaniards was Bruges, and on May 24, the city capitulated without a single shot fired.

== See also ==
- Army of Flanders
- Sir William Stanley
- Rowland York
- List of governors of the Spanish Netherlands
