= Alexander Farnese, Duke of Parma =

Italian general and governor (1545–1592)

Alessandro Farnese
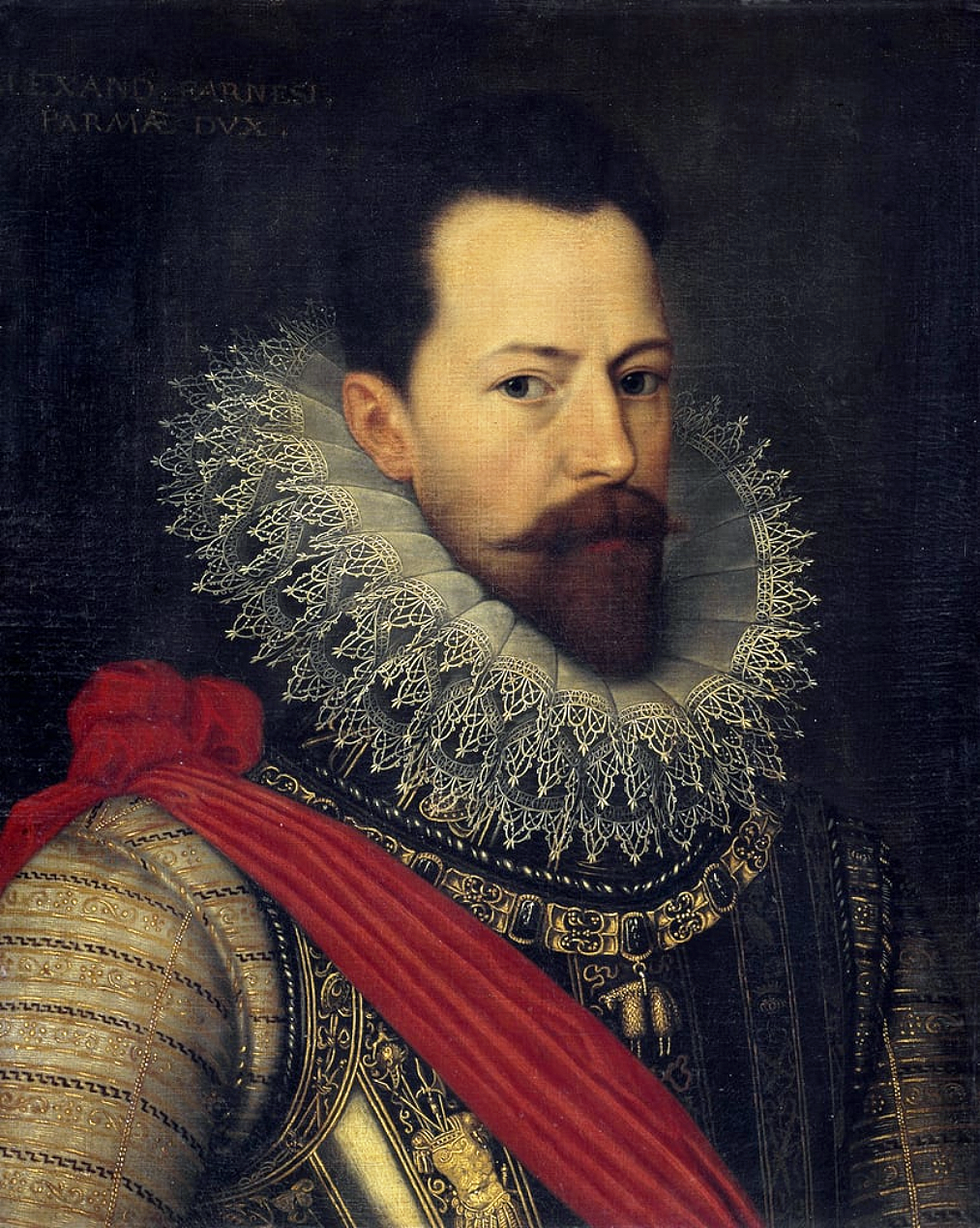
- Portrait by Otto van Veen

Duke of Parma and Piacenza
- Reign: 15 September 1586 – 3 December 1592
- Predecessor: Ottavio
- Successor: Ranuccio I

Governor of the Spanish Netherlands
- In office 1 October 1578 – 3 December 1592
- Monarch: Philip II
- Preceded by: John of Austria
- Succeeded by: Peter Ernst I von Mansfeld-Vorderort
- Born: 27 August 1545; Rome, Papal States
- Died: 3 December 1592 (aged 47); Arras, Kingdom of France
- Burial: Santa Maria della Steccata
- Spouse: Infanta Maria of Portugal (m. 1565; died 1577)
- Issue: Ranuccio I Farnese, Duke of Parma; Margherita, Hereditary Princess of Mantua; Cardinal Oddoardo
- House: Farnese
- Father: Ottavio Farnese
- Mother: Margaret of Parma
- Religion: Roman Catholicism
- Military career
- Allegiance: Hispanic Monarchy
- Branch: Spanish Army
- Service years: 1571–1592
- Rank: Captain general
- Unit: Tercio
- Conflicts: Ottoman–Venetian War; Battle of Lepanto; Siege of Navarino; Eighty Years' War; Battle of Gembloux; Battle of Borgerhout; Siege of Maastricht; Siege of Lier; Siege of Eindhoven; Battle of Steenbergen; Capture of Aalst; Siege of Ghent; Fall of Antwerp; Siege of Grave; Siege of Venlo; Destruction of Neuss; Siege of Rheinberg; Battle of Zutphen; Siege of Sluis; Siege of Bergen op Zoom; Capture of Geertruidenberg; Siege of Knodsenburg; Cologne War; Destruction of Neuss; Siege of Rheinberg; French Wars of Religion; Siege of Paris; Siege of Rouen; Siege of Caudebec

Alexander Farnese (Italian: Alessandro Farnese, Spanish: Alejandro Farnesio; 27 August 1545 – 3 December 1592) was an Italian noble and military leader, who was Duke of Parma, Piacenza and Castro from 1586 to 1592, as well as Governor of the Spanish Netherlands from 1578 to 1592. Nephew to King Philip II of Spain, he served in the Battle of Lepanto and the subsequent campaigns of the Holy League against the Ottoman Empire. He was later appointed general of the Spanish army during the Dutch revolt and its ramifications, serving in Netherlands, France and the Holy Roman Empire until his death in 1592.

Farnese was regarded by contemporaries and historians as the greatest general of his age, as well as one of the best in history, for his talents as a commander, strategist and diplomat. He held a high leadership over the soldiers and mercenaries of varied nationalities which composed the Spanish tercios, including Spaniards, Italians, Germans and Walloons. His campaigns marked Spain's greatest successes in the Eighty Years' War, giving the Spanish crown permanent control of the southern provinces, in the process establishing the cultural and religious separation which would eventually become the nation of Belgium.

During the French Wars of Religion, he decisively relieved Paris for the Catholic League, and also intervened in the Cologne War, granting victory to Ernest of Bavaria. He was slated to direct the land invasion of the British isles in the maligned 1588 Spanish Armada, which failed to embark him and his Army of Flanders. British historian Edward Shepherd Creasy wrote about him: "happy it is for England and the world that this island was saved from becoming an arena for the exhibition of his powers".

== Early life: 1545–1577 ==
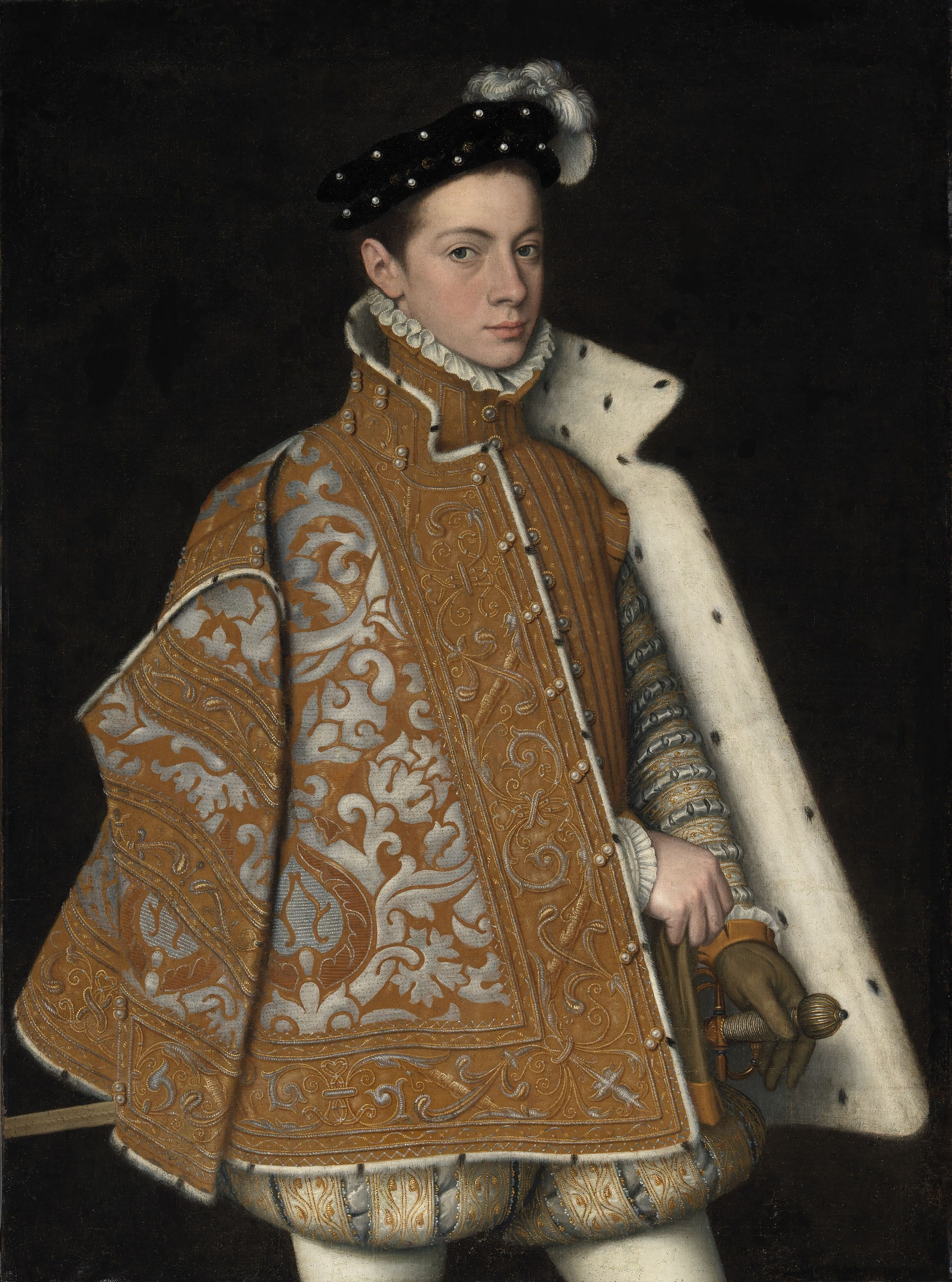
Portrait of the Prince when he was 15 by Sofonisba Anguissola, 1560

Alessandro, born 27 August 1545, was the son of Duke Ottavio Farnese of Parma (a grandson of Pope Paul III) and Margaret of Austria (an illegitimate daughter of the Holy Roman Emperor and king of Spain Charles V). He had a twin brother, Carlo, who died in Rome on 7 October 1549. He and his mother, the half-sister of Philip II of Spain and Don Juan, left Rome for Parma in 1550. When Margaret was appointed Governor of the Netherlands, Alessandro accompanied her to Brussels in 1556 and was delivered to Philip II to ensure the loyalty of the Farnese. While in the King's custody, he visited the English royal court and then went to Spain to be raised and educated with his cousin, the ill-fated Don Carlos and his half-uncle, Don Juan, both of whom were about the same age as himself.

Coat of Arms of the Farnese as dukes of Parma.

In 1565 his marriage with Maria of Portugal, which ended his stint as Philip II's hostage, was celebrated in Brussels with great splendour. He commanded three galleys during the Battle of Lepanto (1571) and the subsequent campaigns against the Turks. It was seven years before he again had the opportunity to display his great military talents. During that time the provinces of the Netherlands had revolted against Spanish rule. Don Juan, who had been sent as governor-general to restore order, found difficulties in dealing with William the Silent, who had succeeded in uniting all the provinces in common resistance to King Philip II.

== Governor-General of the Netherlands ==
In the autumn of 1577 shortly after his wife's death, Farnese led Spanish reinforcements from Italy along the Spanish Road to join Don Juan, and it was his able strategy and prompt decision at a critical moment that decisively won the Battle of Gembloux in early 1578. Shortly thereafter was the Siege of Zichem (Dutch) where the garrison was put to the sword and the town was sacked. This incident is considered to be the biggest stain on Farnese's otherwise chivalrous career. Next was the five-day Siege of Nivelles (Dutch) (French) in March 1578. The example of Zichem encouraged the citizens to capitulate so quickly. That summer, Farnese managed to prevent the defeat at the Battle of Rijmenam from being decisive.

In October 1578, Don Juan, whose health had broken down, died. Phillip II appointed Farnese to take his place as Captain-General of the Army of Flanders and appointed his mother Margaret as Governor-General. This was unacceptable to Alexander; he demanded to be both Captain-General and Governor-General or he would resign thus leaving military matters entirely in Margaret's hands. Philip eventually capitulated and after four years, Margaret returned to Parma.

Upon Don Juan's death, Farnese was confronted with a difficult situation. Perceiving that his opponents were divided between Catholic and Protestant, Fleming and Walloon, he skillfully worked to exploit these divisions. By this means, he regained the allegiance of the Walloon provinces for the king. Through the treaty of Arras, January 1579, he secured the support of the "Malcontents" (the Catholic nobles of the south) for the royal cause. The rebels in the seven northern provinces then formed the Union of Utrecht, formally abjuring Phillip's rule and pledging to fight to the end.

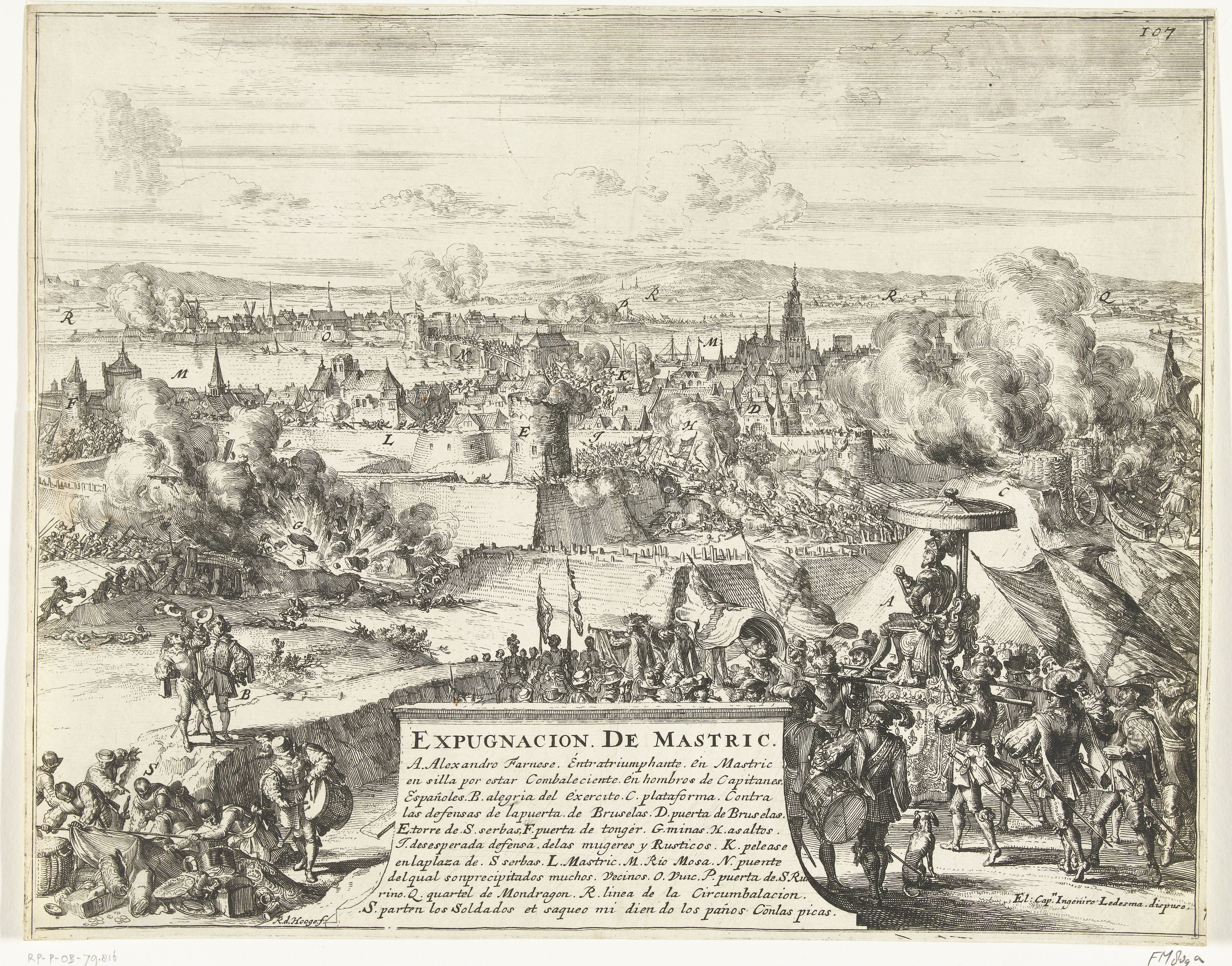
The Siege of Maastricht in 1579

As soon as he had secured a base of operations in Hainaut and Artois, Farnese set himself in earnest to the task of reconquering Brabant and Flanders by force of arms, beginning with Maastricht. Farnese commenced the Siege of Maastricht on 12 March 1579. He ordered his troops to sap the walls. The inhabitants of Maastricht were also digging to reach the Spanish tunnels. Deep underground the fighting continued, hundreds of Spanish soldiers died as boiling oil was poured into their tunnels. Others died because of a lack of oxygen when the Dutch defenders ignited fires within them. Another 500 Spanish soldiers died when a mine, which they planned to use to blow up the wall, exploded prematurely.

On the night of 29 June, Farnese's men managed to get into the city while the exhausted defenders were asleep. Since the city had not surrendered after the walls had been breached, laws of warfare in the 16th century gave the victors the right to loot the conquered city. The Spanish looted the city for three days during which time many civilians lost their lives. The looting was particularly violent, perhaps because Farnese was in bed with a fever during those three days.

In adherence to the treaty of Arras, the Spanish troops were expelled from the country so Alexander only had the Walloon troops available for the Siege of Tournai (Dutch). The difficulties encountered with the ragtag troops during that siege helped convince the Walloon lords to allow for the return of foreign, more importantly, Spanish troops.

In a war composed mostly of sieges rather than battles, Parma proved his mettle. His strategy was to offer generous terms for surrender: there would be no massacres or looting; historic urban privileges were retained; there was a full pardon and amnesty; return to the Catholic Church would be gradual.

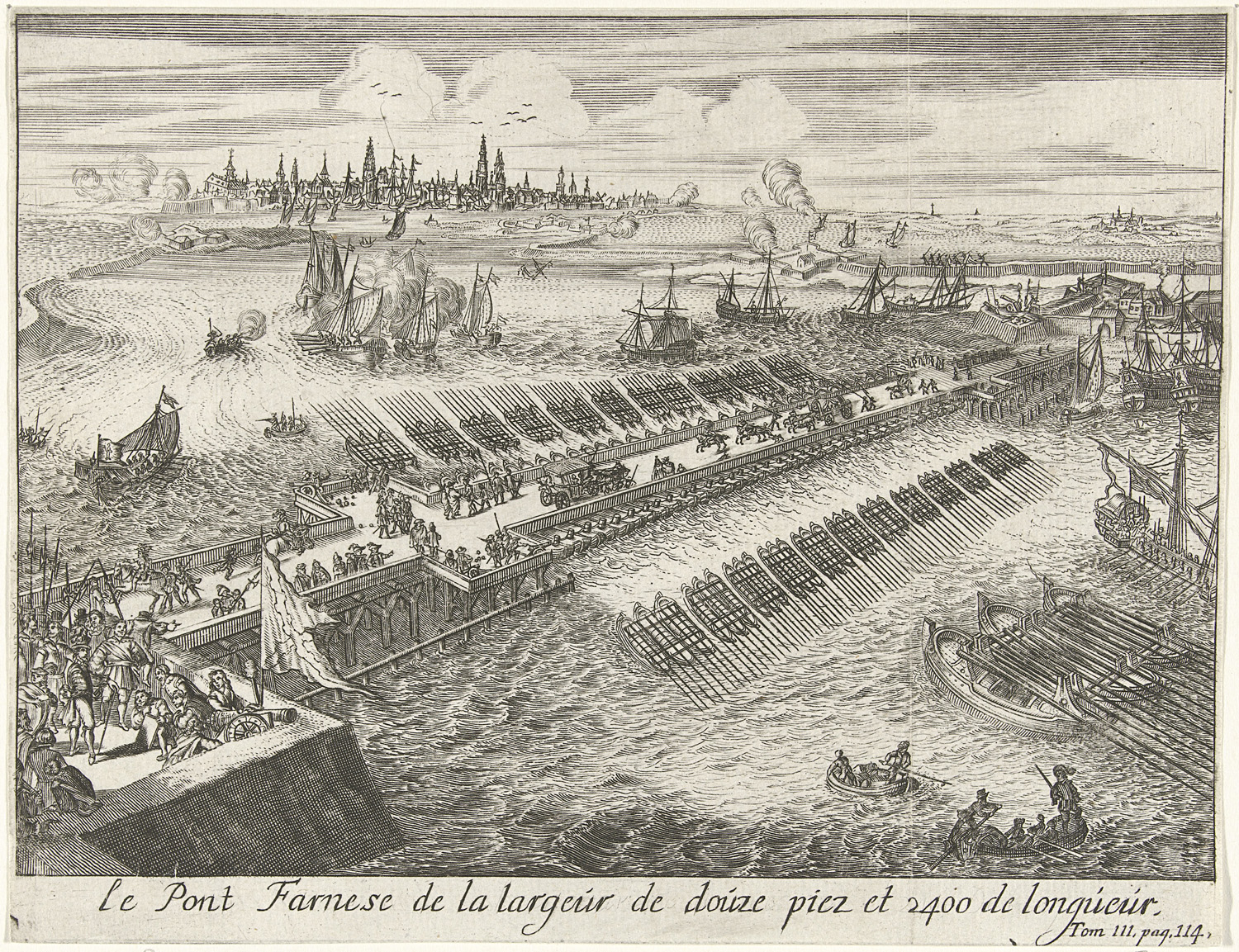
Parma's bridge-of-boats over the Scheldt in 1585.

The apex of Alexander Farnese's career was when he laid siege to the great seaport of Antwerp. The town was open to the sea, strongly fortified, and defended with resolute determination and courage by its citizens. The latter were led by the famous Marnix van St. Aldegonde and assisted by an ingenious Italian engineer named Federigo Giambelli. The siege began in 1584 and called forth all of Farnese's military genius. He cut off all access to Antwerp from the sea by constructing a bridge of boats across the Scheldt from Kallo (then spelt Calloo) to Oordam, in spite of the desperate efforts of the besieged townspeople. The terms offered included the clause that all Protestants had to leave the city within four years. This disciplined capture and occupation of the town should not be confused with the bloody events of the Spanish Fury on 4 November 1576. Farnese avoided the mistakes of his predecessors including Don Luis de Requesens. With the Fall of Antwerp, and with Mechelen and Brussels already in the hands of Farnese, the whole of the southern Netherlands was once more placed under the authority of Philip II. Both Holland and Zeeland, whose geographical position made them unassailable except by water, were hard-pressed to retain the territory.

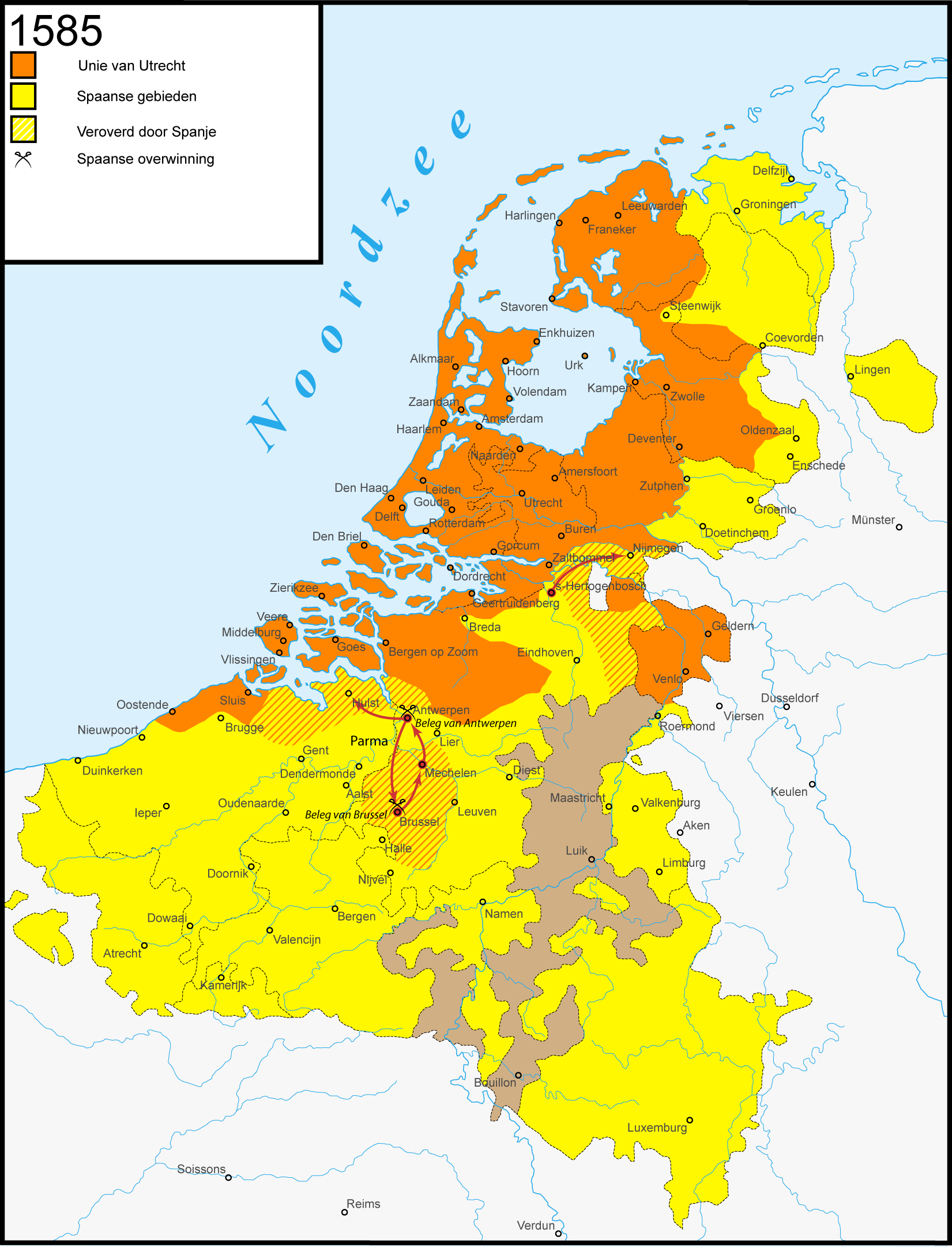
State of war in 1585.

Alexander pressed operations in the regions of the Meuse and the Rhine so as to maintain trade with Germany and prepare a gateway for winning Holland and Zeeland. Unfortunately for the prince, Phillip II's parsimonious disbursement of money started having its effect in the campaigns following Antwerp's conquest. The first notable Spanish defeat under Farnese's command came at his first attempt to take control of Grave. In December 1585, with the growing food shortage, Farnese marched his troops towards the Rhine and Meuse regions so as to spare Flanders, Brabant and the Walloon provinces the burden of feeding them and, while there, undertake operations to secure trade along those rivers. That winter was nearly disastrous for Farnese's army were it not for the "Miracle of Empel". Nevertheless, by 7 June the Siege of Grave (1586) was a fait accompli. On the other hand, fortunately for Alexander, who became Duke upon his father's death in 1586, the poorly supplied English forces, sent by Elizabeth I, were duly defeated by the Duke's forces. The Siege of Sluis (1587) was necessary, so as to secure a safe harbour for the Armada ships, and was successful.

== Spanish Armada ==
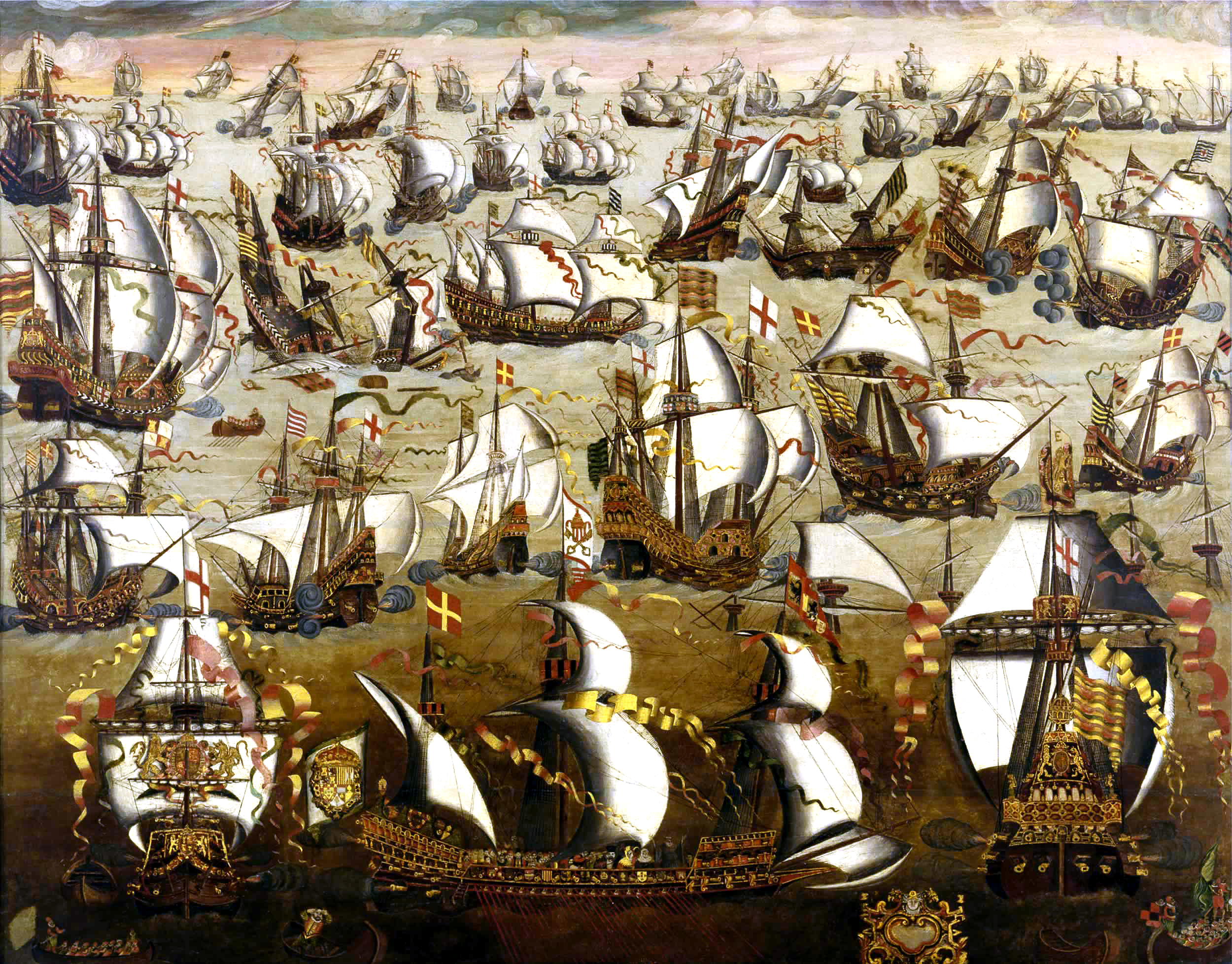
Alexander Farnese was made responsible for the failure of the Armada which marked the beginning of the end of his brilliant career.

When Alexander Farnese became Duke of Parma through the death of his father; he never ruled, instead naming his son Ranuccio as regent. He applied for leave to visit his paternal territory but Philip II would not grant it as there were no suitable candidates in the Netherlands to replace him. However, while retaining him in his command at the head of a formidable army, the king would not give his sanction to his great general's desire to use it for the conquest of England, at the time a supporter of the rebels.

Although Farnese was not enthusiastic about the project, in November 1583, he initially believed it possible to successfully invade England from the Netherlands with a force of 30,000 troops relying mainly on the hope of a native Catholic insurrection, but emphasized to Philip II that it was imperative for three conditions to be met: the main condition was the maintenance of absolute secrecy; second, secure the possession and defence of the Dutch provinces; third, keep the French from interfering either by way of a peace agreement or by sowing division amongst the Huguenots and Catholics. Philip overruled him and solicited the Marquis of Santa Cruz to draft and present an invasion plan called the Enterprise of England, more commonly known as the Spanish Armada. As part of the general campaign preparations, Farnese moved against Ostend and Sluis, the latter of which would be taken on August 1587.

The plan was that Parma's troops would cross the channel in barges, protected by the Armada. Santa Cruz was appointed commander of the armada but died in early 1588 and command of the armada was given to the incompetent Duke of Medina Sidonia. The Armada entered the English Channel in the summer of that year but poor communication between Parma and the Armada's commander made effective coordination difficult. Alexander informed Philip II that his barges were nothing more than flat-bottomed transport vessels, not warships, and he was being blockaded by English ships thus preventing him from leaving Nieuwpoort and Dunkirk. Farnese expected the Armada to clear a passage for his barges. Parma's troops were also threatened by the presence of Dutch forces in flyboats, who hoped to destroy the barges and drown Parma's army at sea. In contrast, Medina Sidonia expected Parma to fight his way out from the ports and meet him in the channel. The English attack on the Armada in the Battle of Gravelines (1588), followed by an unfavourable change in wind direction, made link-up impossible.

After the failure of the Armada, fortune seems to have abandoned the Duke of Parma. Farnese broke up his camp in Dunkirk in September and sent the Marquis de Renty to the island of Tholen in preparation to besiege the predominately English garrison at Bergen Op Zoom. Renty did not succeed in capturing Tholen, blaming bad weather, whereupon Farnese expressed that he should have led the expedition personally. Nevertheless, on 19 September 1588, Alexander set out from Bruges with his army to besiege Bergen Op Zoom. After a six-week siege, with winter approaching, Parma abandoned the enterprise and withdrew to Brussels, sending his troops into winter quarters.

Alexander's final major victory in the Netherlands was Geertruidenberg, a strategic gateway to Holland. The English garrison there was in full revolt for lack of pay. An English representative offered the city to Parma and it was ultimately delivered to him on 9 April 1589.

== French Wars of Religion ==
The Duke of Parma started feeling the first effects of oedema after the failed siege of Bergen op Zoom. He had to go to the town of Spa to treat his illness for nearly six months. During this time, the Old Tercio of Lombardy had mutinied and Farnese ordered that it be dissolved. Following this incident, Alexander's lieutenants suffered defeats in Friesland and Rheinberg.

=== First expedition into France ===
Farnese intended to turn his attention back to the northern Netherlands, where the Dutch rebels had regrouped, but on the night of 1–2 August 1589, Henry III of France was assassinated, and Farnese was ordered into France, in support of the Duke of Mayenne and the Catholic opposition to Protestant Henri de Navarre known also as the "Béarnaise". This enabled the Dutch rebels to regain momentum in their revolt, which had been in ever deeper trouble since 1576. Parma had warned Philip II that the French incursion would endanger the gains made in the Netherlands and stated he would not accept responsibility for the losses or failures resulting from not heeding his advice.

Parma left Brussels on 6 August 1590 and ultimately arrived at Guise on 15 August. In late August, he moved to relieve Paris from the lengthy siege it had been placed under by Huguenots and Royalists loyal to Henry IV. Farnese's main goal was simply to resupply Paris by raising the blockade, not obliterating Henry's army. When Henry learned of the approach of Mayenne and Farnese, he broke camp to actively engage in battle. Parma had no intention of engaging in combat. He determined that capturing the fort at Lagny-sur-Marne would ensure traffic was maintained along the river Marne which was still in the hands of the Catholic League. At dawn on 5 September, Lagny was bombarded then stormed by Spanish troops who put its 800-man garrison to the sword, all within sight of Henri's camp, a mere 12 km away. The latter abandoned the siege of Paris two days later but made one last "Hail Mary" attempt on 8–9 September which failed. With the course of the Marne completely open to traffic, supplies flowed into Paris for the next several days.

Keeping Paris supplied required the influx of victuals from multiple sources but most of Henri's forces occupied the areas along the Seine and Yonne rivers so Parma decided to clear Corbeil in order to restore traffic on the Seine. The siege began on 22 September and by 16 October, the town was taken. Its garrison was put to the sword and the town was thoroughly sacked. With the siege of Paris lifted and its supply routes secured, Farnese took the road on 3 November back to the Netherlands, where Maurice of Nassau had gone on the offensive. Alexander's withdraw was not an easy one. He had thousands of men, wagons and horses to move during foul weather with the Béarnaise harassing him the entire way. Anticipating these difficulties, the Duke arranged his columns in such a way that Henri could not rout him. Twenty days into the march, on 25 November near Amiens, Henri with his cavalry boldly charged Farnese's column only to himself be routed beyond the river Aisne and getting wounded during the retreat. One final unsuccessful skirmish took place on 29 November where Henri was within a few hundred paces of Farnese.

Parma and Mayenne parted ways at Guise and Alexander arrived in Brussels on 4 December 1590.

=== Maurice of Nassau's offensive ===
Alexander Farnese had appointed Peter Ernst von Mansfeld as acting Governor-General while he was in France. Days after Farnese's departure for France, Mansfeld and Colonel Francisco Verdugo, operating in Friesland, began lamenting to Philip II about the lack of money, supplies, and troop mutinies, all the things Farnese had been complaining about for the past several years. By the time Farnese had returned, Maurice had regained Steenbergen, Roosendaal, Oosterhout, Turnhout, and Westerlo. Farnese's absence brought with it a reduction in military activity on the part of the Spanish thus allowing the Dutch some time to reflect on what policies they needed to adopt that would be most effective against their enemy. This was the beginning of the Dutch Military Reforms which finally allowed them to have an even footing against the Spanish; Alexander had finally met his match in Maurice, the Prince of Orange.

=== Second expedition into France ===
On the night of 24 July 1591, just days after engaging in the siege of Knodsenburg, Alexander Farnese received orders from Philip II to drop everything and go back to France to aid the Catholic League. Realizing the difficulties of capturing this fort, he was actually relieved to be able to honourably abandon this enterprise engaged under bad auspices. Before he could even consider another expedition to aid the League, he needed to resume his treatments at Spa whence he arrived on 1 August with his son Ranuccio. In mid-November, Alexander drafted instructions for the interim Governor-General, Mansfeld again, in addition to putting measures in place for the defence of the Netherlands while he was away. By the end of November, the Duke was in Valenciennes where he mustered his troops. Towards the middle of January 1592, Parma had rendezvoused with Mayenne and made preparations to rescue Rouen from Henri.

Before heading to Rouen, Farnese made the strategic decision to capture Neufchâtel-en-Bray. This would keep supply lines open. Finally, on 20 April, Parma arrived a few miles from Rouen where he was met by 50 cavalry sent by Villars. They informed him that Henri had lifted the siege and withdrew in the direction of Pont-de-l'Arche to entrench there.; Rouen was saved. Rather than follow Farnese's advice and attack Henri's camp and destroy his forces, the League's leaders chose to capture Caudebec-en-Caux where he was subsequently wounded by a musket shot in the right forearm during the siege whilst reconnoitring the town. The wound undermined his already precarious health even more and he was forced to call his son Ranuccio to take command of the troops. Henri saw therein an opportunity to avenge the loss of Rouen. Rather than risk a full attack against the League's forces, he took a page from Farnese's book and decided to cut off all supply routes and starve them. The League's army abandoned Caudebec for Yvetot. The situation was worse than at Caudebec, all the while, Farnese was seriously ill and mostly bed-ridden yet still sharp in mind. The Duke of Parma finally devised a plan to clandestinely cross the Seine in boats leaving just enough men to make Henri believe the entire army was encamped. The Catholic army was across the river and long gone by the time Henri learned of it, literally right under his nose. After returning to the Netherlands, Alexander received a letter from Pope Clement VIII on 28 June congratulating him “for rescuing the Catholic Army.” Farnese quickly made his way back to Spa for yet more treatments.

== Death ==
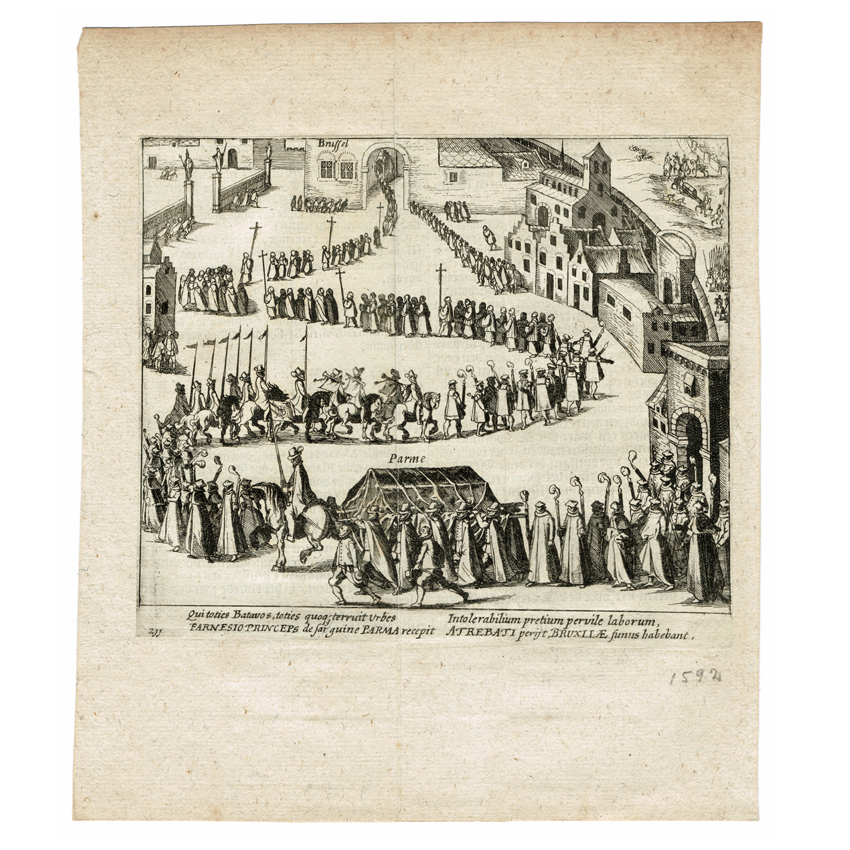
Arrival of the funeral procession of the Duke of Parma in Brussels 1592. Print from 'The Wars of Nassau' by Willem Baudartius.

=== Alexander Farnese's removal from office ===
Ever since the failed armada campaign against England, Spanish agents and courtiers in Philip II's court who were jealous of Farnese's success had been engaged in a malicious campaign to discredit the Duke of Parma in the eyes of the king. After Farnese's return from his second French campaign, the king, who had always favoured his nephew Alexander, allowed these complaints and accusations to influence his opinion. This change in sentiment caused the king to order the duke removed from his post in the Netherlands. The sovereign drafted a recall letter on 20 February 1592, while Farnese was marching on Rouen, and tasked Juan Pacheco de Toledo, II marqués de Cerralbo, to personally deliver it to the duke upon his return to Flanders. Cerralbo died along the way. The king then assigned Pedro Henriquez de Acevedo, Count of Fuentes to carry out this mission. The date of the recall letter was changed to 28 June 1592. Given Philip II's nature toward duplicitous intrigue, the king reassured Farnese that everything was fine, all the while arranging for his recall from Flanders. The duke knew nothing about these machinations and by October was feeling well enough to return to Brussels only to learn that he was ordered to aid the League yet again.

=== Final expedition into France ===
Fully aware of his state of health, the Duke of Parma, nevertheless, prepared for this campaign by arranging for loans and sumptuous quarters in Paris so as to give the appearance of a powerful representative of the King of Spain. He had written his last will and testament, repeatedly went to confession and took holy communion, and sent his son back to Parma so that, upon his death, the Farnesian States would not be deprived of a ruler.

The duke left Brussels on 11 November, arriving in Arras where, on 2 December 1592, he died at the age of 47.

His mortal remains were dressed in a Capuchin habit, moved to Parma and buried in the Capuchin church, next to his wife's tomb. Later, their mortal remains were moved to the crypt of the Basilica of the Madonna della Steccata, where they are still found today. His death spared him from seeing the provision by which he was relieved of the post of Governor-General.

In January 2020, the Duke's remains were exhumed in a bid to clarify the circumstances of his death which were ultimately determined to be pneumonia.

== Legacy ==
16th-century inscription honoring Farnese in the Palazzo dei Conservatori, Rome

Historian Edward Shepherd Creasy regarded Farnese as "one of the most formidable generals that ever could be placed at the head of an army designed not only to win battles, but to effect conquests" due to his combination of military talent and political wisdom. Others authors similarly cite him as the first general of his age. Historian John Keegan extolled Farnese's military skill and his conjunction of "Italian cunning... and love of battle". Garrett Mattingly also praised his ability to fluidly coordinate the many nationalities and allegiances of the Spanish armies. His name is commemorated in the modern Tercio Alejandro Farnesio No. 4 of the Spanish Legion.

Spencer C. Tucker also considered Farnese as "a brilliant strategist and diplomat and an able military commander", under whom Spain achieved the most comprehensive successes in the history of the Eighty Years' War, capturing more than thirty towns between 1581 and 1587 before being diverted to the French theater. Farnese was esteemed even by his Protestants adversaries for his success and charisma, as well as his good faith with the vanquished. He found his only rival in Maurice of Nassau, who Keegan considered probably inferior to Farnese. Farnese's campaigns are considered the original source of the separation between the modern nations of Belgium and the Netherlands.

== List of battles ==
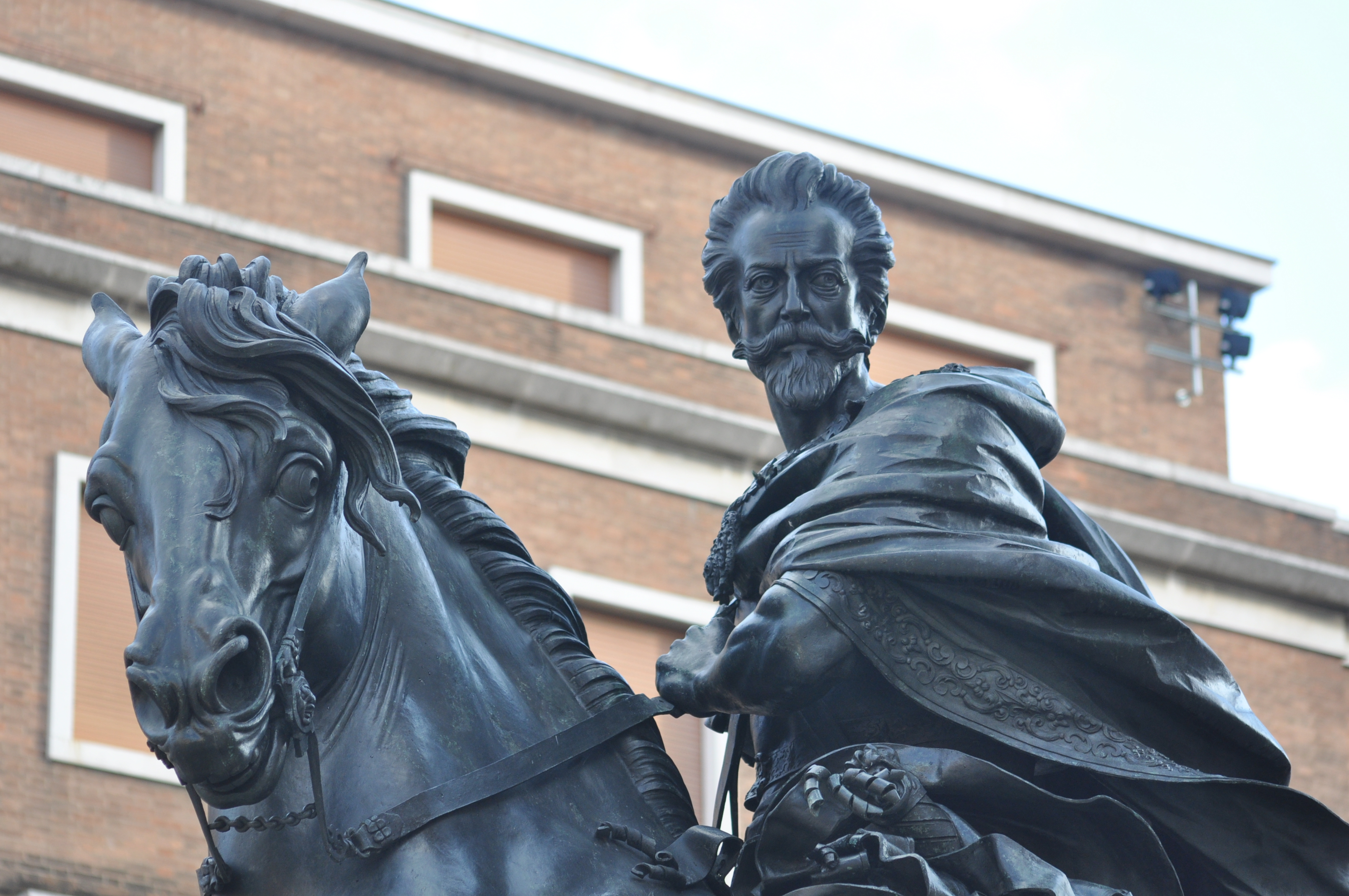
Equestrian statue of Don Alexander Farnese by Francesco Mochi.

Ottoman–Venetian War (1570–1573)

- Battle of Lepanto (1571)
- Battle of Koroni (1572)
- Siege of Navarino (1572)

Eighty Years War

- Battle of Gembloux (1578)
- Siege of Zichem
- Siege of Nivelles (Dutch) (French)
- Siege of Limbourg
- Capture of Dalhem
- Battle of Borgerhout
- Siege of Maastricht (1579)
- Siege of Cambrai (1581)
- Siege of Tournai (1581)
- Siege of Oudenaarde
- Siege of Lier (1582)
- Siege of Eindhoven (1583)
- Battle of Steenbergen (1583)
- Capture of Aalst (1584)
- Siege of Ghent (1583–1584)
- Siege of Brussel (1584–1585)
- Battle of Kouwensteinsedijk
- Fall of Antwerp
- Siege of Grave (1586)
- Siege of Venlo (1586)
- Destruction of Neuss
- Siege of Rheinberg (1586–1590)
- Battle of Zutphen
- Siege of Sluis (1587)
- Siege of Bergen op Zoom (1588)
- Capture of Geertruidenberg (1589)
- Siege of Knodsenburg

French Wars of Religion

- Siege of Paris (1590)
- Siege of Rouen (1591–1592)
- Siege of Caudebec

== Issue ==
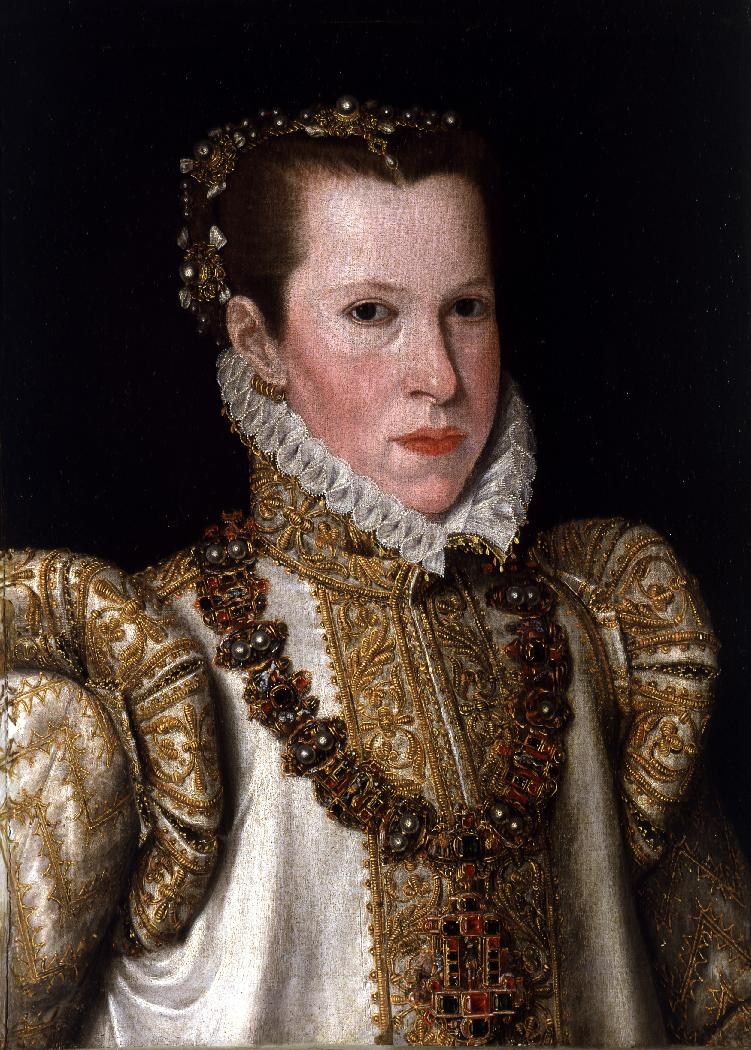
Maria of Portugal

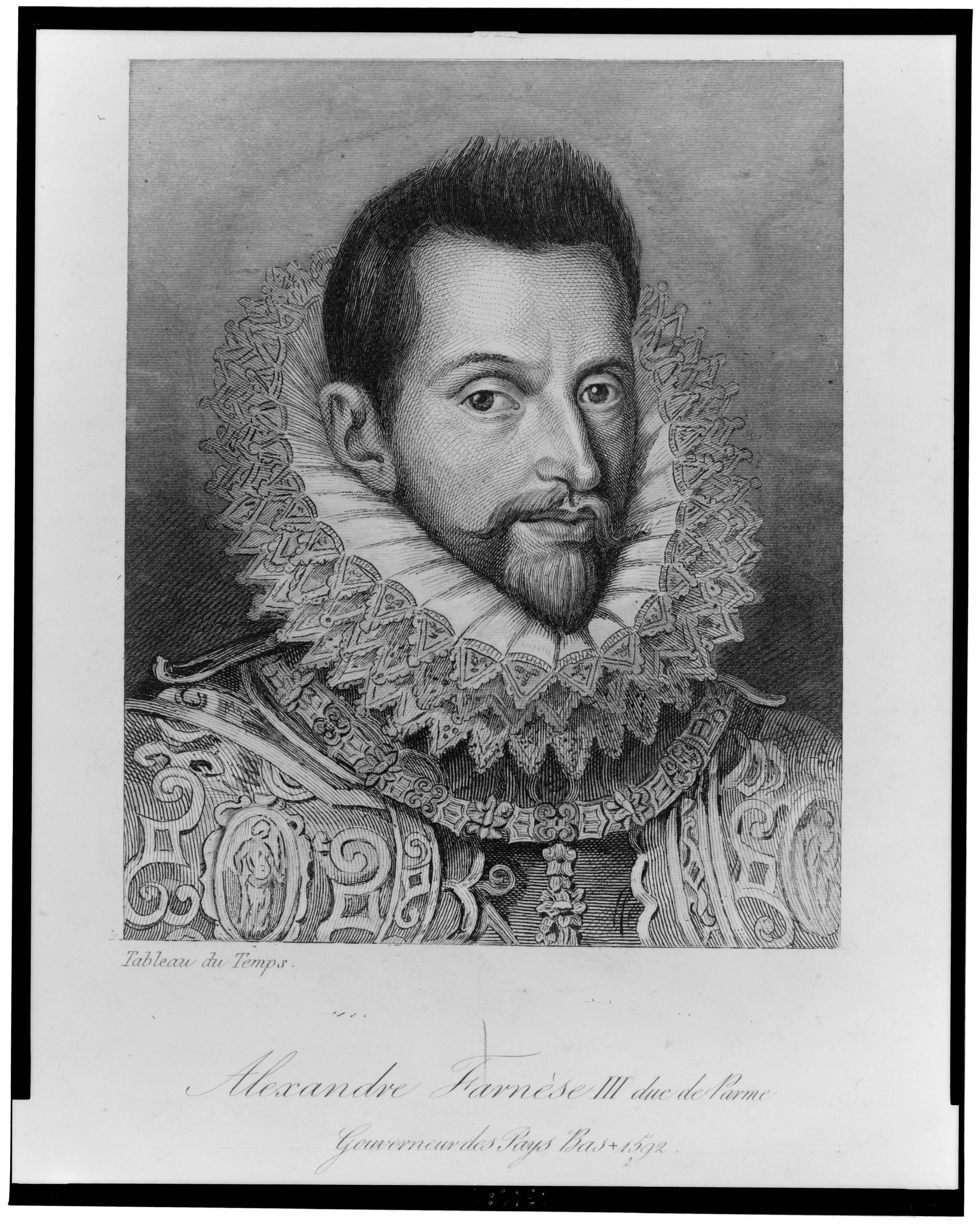
Engraving of Alexander Farnese, 1592

From his marriage with Infanta Maria of Portugal, also known as Maria of Guimarães, he had three children:

Name	Birth	Death	Notes
Margherita Farnese	7 November 1567	13 April 1643	married, 1581, Vincenzo I, Duke of Mantua; no issue
Ranuccio Farnese	28 March 1569	5 March 1622	succeeded as Duke of Parma married, 1600, Margherita Aldobrandini; had issue
Odoardo Farnese	7 December 1573	21 February 1626	became a Cardinal

=== Illegitimate issue ===
Alessandro Farnese had an affair with Françoise de Renty (a.k.a., "La Belle Franchine"), a young Flemish noblewoman, confirmed by an unpublished letter of instruction from Parma, contained in the manuscript at the Bibliotecca Nazionale di Napoli, Brancacciani F1, ff. 68–91v, to Pietro Caetani, on his way to serve Alessandro Farnese in the Netherlands, on how he should behave with her:

Ama il Principe una Signora di qualità e fa piacere che da coloro che stimano il favor suo ella che sia corteggiata e servita… [The Prince loves a lady of quality and is pleased when she is courted and served by those who esteem his favour...]

Although there is nothing to say with certainty about children from this relationship, according to Bertini, Farnese arranged for, and gave incentives to, Count Jean-Charles de Gavre, a nobleman in Alessandro's household, to marry Françoise in 1586. Considering that the couple's first child, Marie-Alexandrine-Françoise de Gavre, was born soon afterwards in 1587, that her name (Alexandrine) is not found amongst either parent's ancestors, and the influence Françoise had over Farnese, it is quite possible that he was the child's biological father.

== Gallery ==
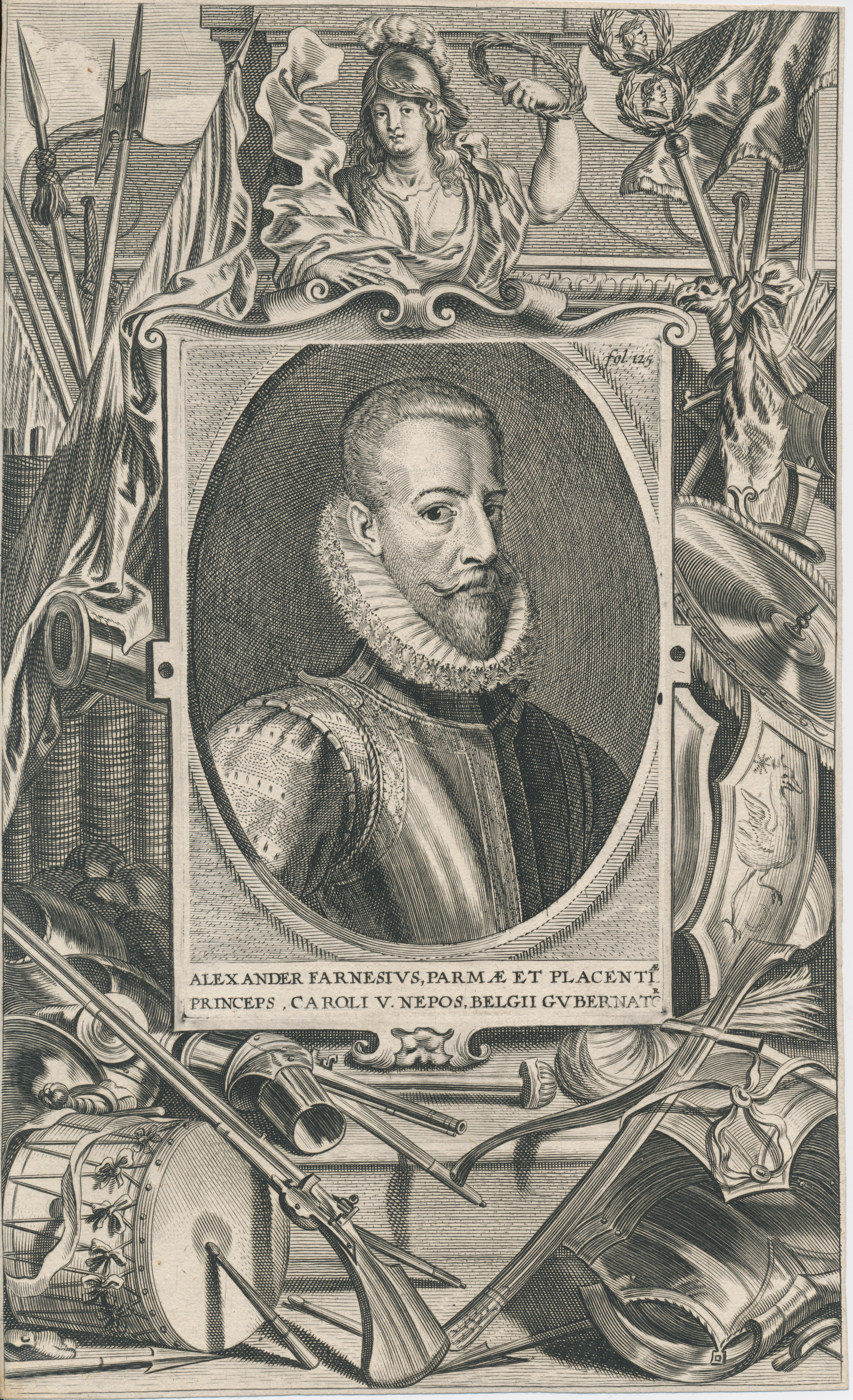
Alexander Farnese 1545–1592 Erfgoedcentrum Rozet 300 191 d 2 A-43

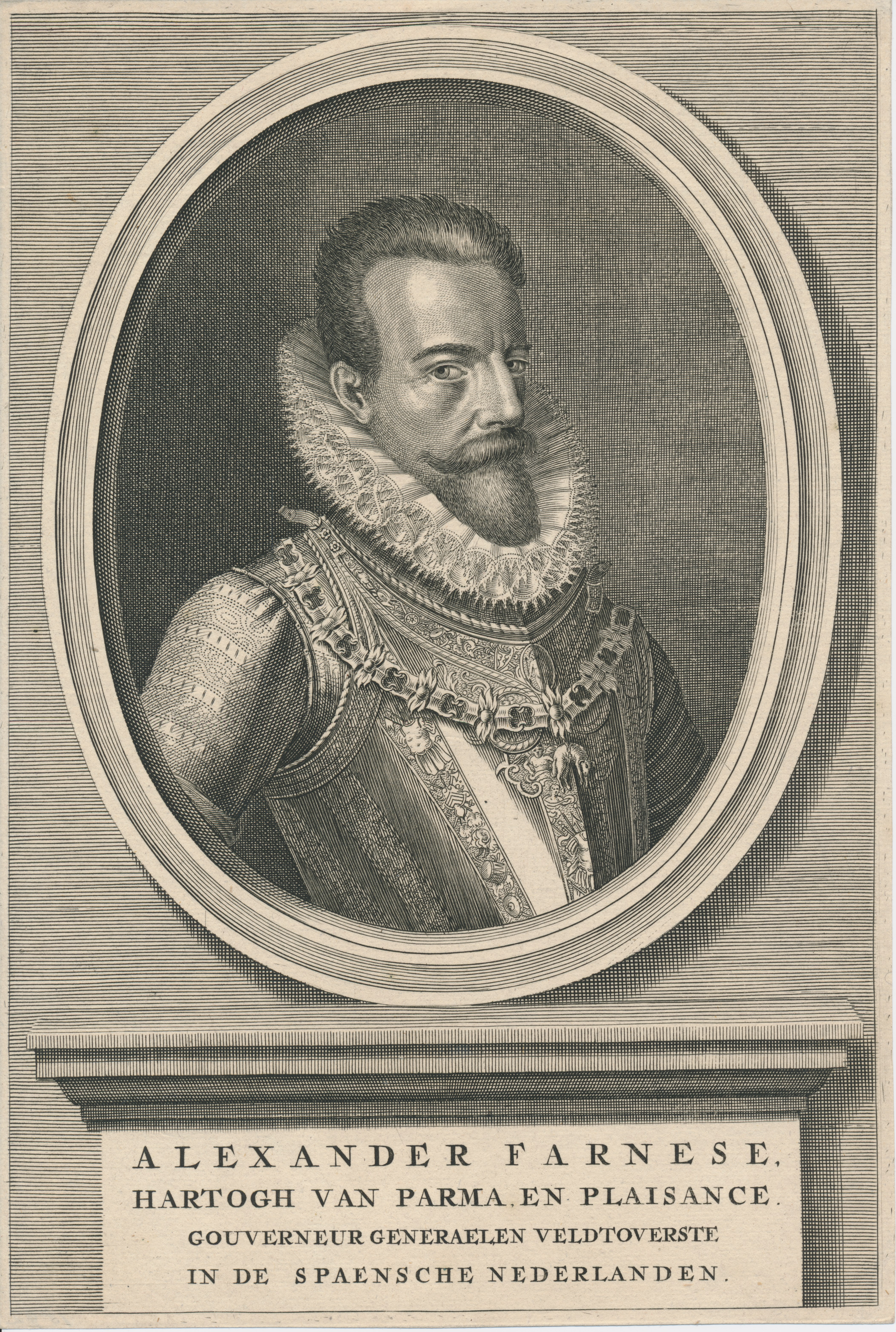
Alexander Farnese 1545–1592 Erfgoedcentrum Rozet 300 191 d 2 A-47

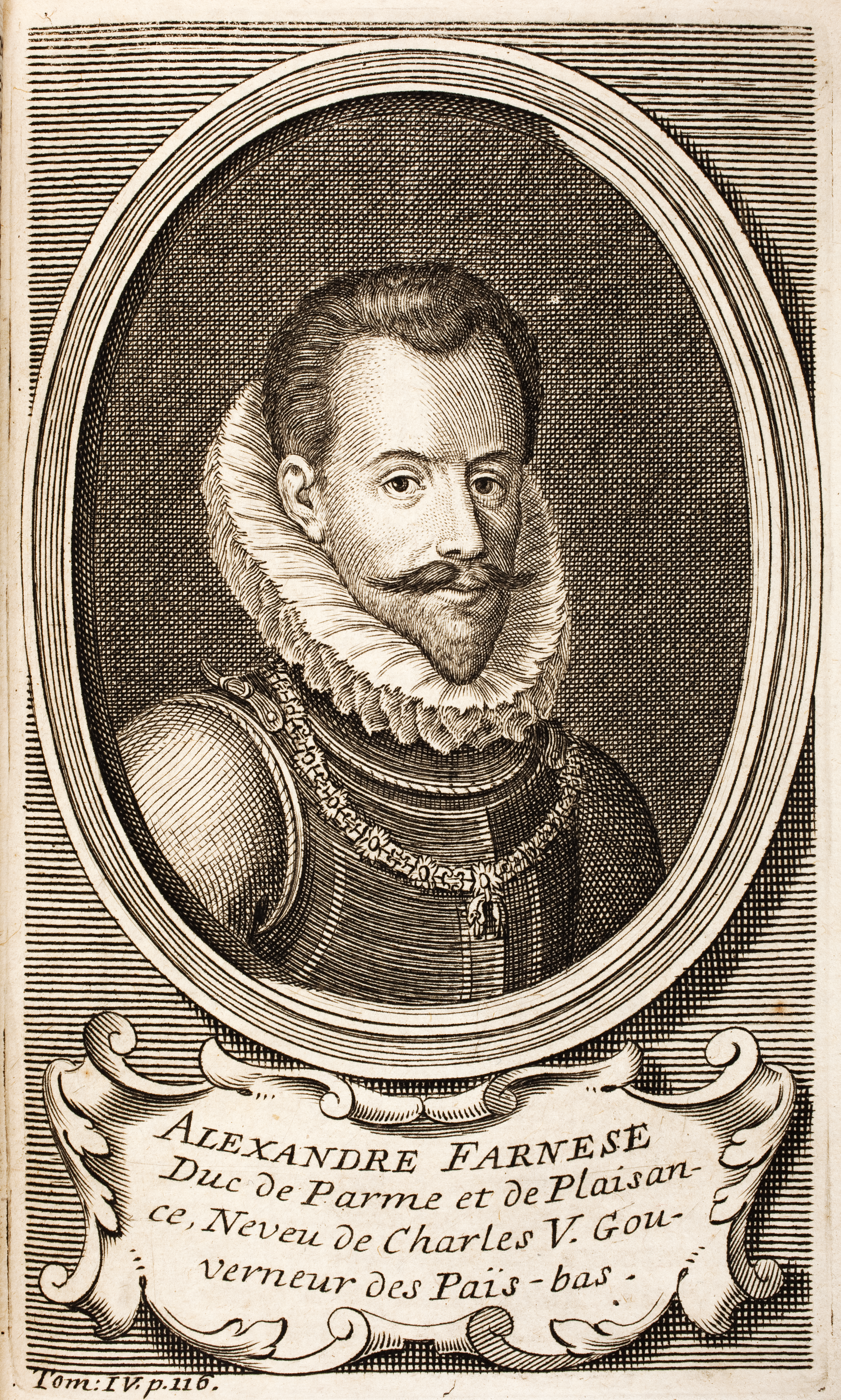
Alexander Farnese in a 1727 engraving

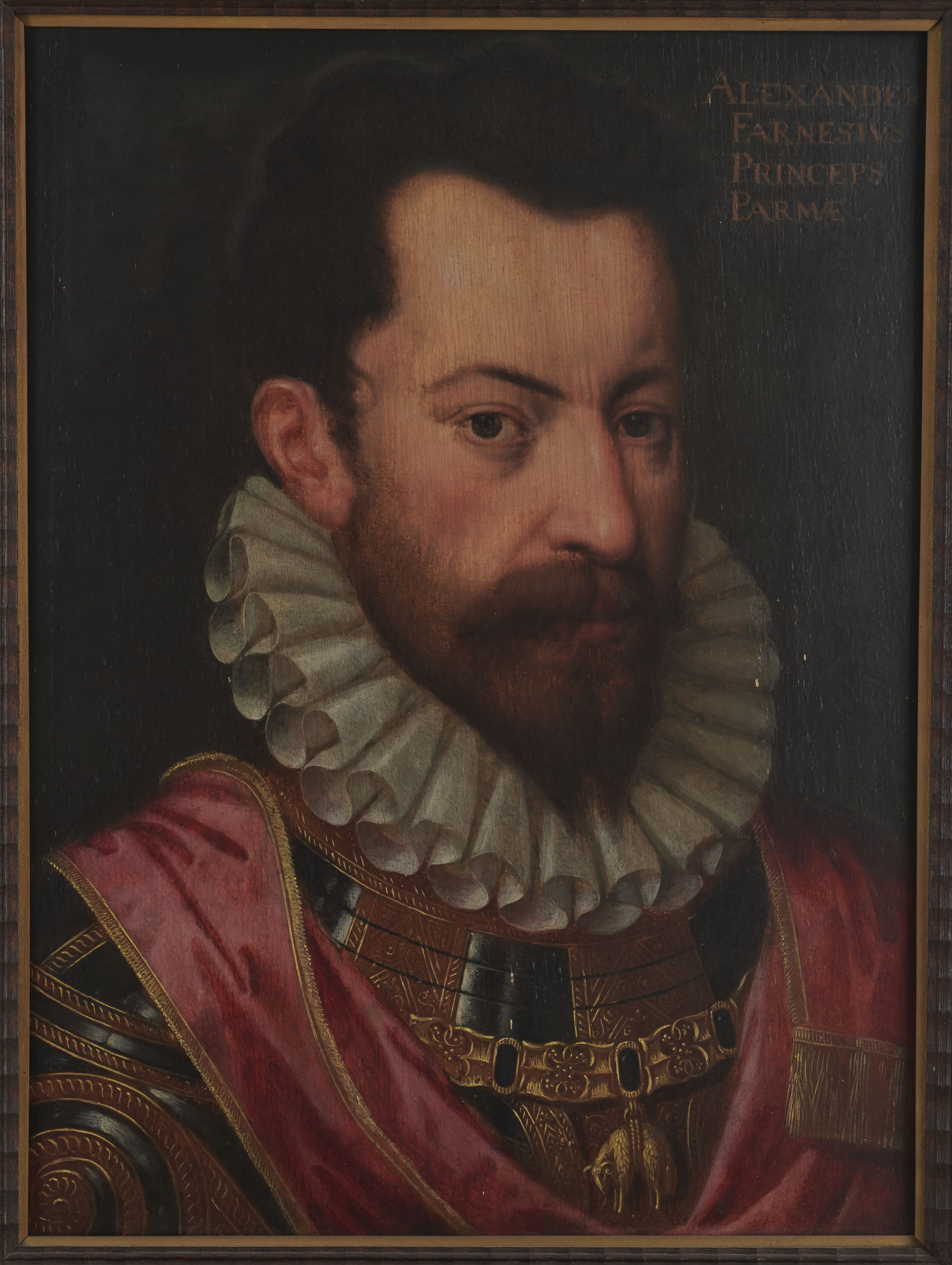
Portrait of Farnese by Antoon Claeissens, c. 1590

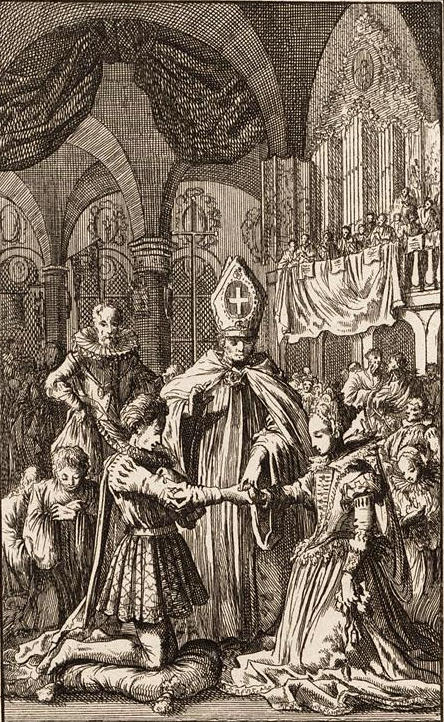
Farnese marries Maria Princess of Portugal by Jan Luyken (1720)

== Ancestry ==
Ancestors of Alexander Farnese, Duke of Parma

8. Pope Paul III
4. Pier Luigi Farnese, Duke of Parma
9. Silvia Ruffini
2. Ottavio Farnese, Duke of Parma
10. Ludovico Orsini, Count of Pitigliano
5. Gerolama Orsini
11. Giulia Conti
1. Alessandro Farnese, Duke of Parma
12. Philip I of Castile
6. Charles V, Holy Roman Emperor
13. Joanna of Castile
3. Margaret of Parma
14. Gilles van der Gheynst
7. Johanna van der Gheynst
15. Johanna van der Coye

== See also ==
- Citadel of Parma

== Bibliography ==
- Poncet, Olivier (2025). Alexandre Farnèse. Paris: Perrin, 352p.
- de Behault, Charles-Albert (2021). Le siège d'Anvers par Alexandre Farnèse. Brussels: Bulletin de l'Association de la Noblesse du Royaume de Belgique, n. 307, juillet 2021.
- De Carlos Bertrán, Luis (2018). Alexander: La extraordinaria historia de Alejandro Farnesio. Editorial Crítica. ISBN 9788491990055.
- Creasy, Edward (1851). The Fifteen Decisive Battles of the World.
- Griffin, Eric J. (2012). English Renaissance Drama and the Specter of Spain: Ethnopoetics and Empire. University of Pennsylvania Press. ISBN 978-081220210-6.
- de Groof, Bart (1993). "Alexander Farnese and the Origins of Modern Belgium". Bulletin de l'Institut Historique Belge de Rome. 63: 195–219. ISSN 0073-8530.
- Keegan, John; Wheatcroft, Andrew (2014). Who's Who in Military History: From 1453 to the Present Day. London: Routledge.
- Marek y Villarino de Brugge, André (2020a). Alessandro Farnese: Prince of Parma: Governor-General of the Netherlands (1545–1592): v. I. Los Angeles: MJV Enterprises ltd. inc. ISBN 979-8687255998.
- Marek y Villarino de Brugge, André (2020b). Alessandro Farnese: Prince of Parma: Governor-General of the Netherlands (1545–1592): v. II. Los Angeles: MJV Enterprises, ltd., inc. ISBN 979-8687563130.
- Marek y Villarino de Brugge, André (2020c). Alessandro Farnese: Prince of Parma: Governor-General of the Netherlands (1545–1592): v. III. Los Angeles: MJV Enterprises, ltd., inc. ISBN 979-8688759655.
- Marek y Villarino de Brugge, André (2020d). Alessandro Farnese: Prince of Parma: Governor-General of the Netherlands (1545–1592): The Siege of Antwerp, v. IV. Los Angeles: MJV Enterprises, ltd., inc. ISBN 979-8689543123.
- Marek y Villarino de Brugge, André (2020e). Alessandro Farnese: Prince of Parma: Governor-General of the Netherlands (1545–1592): v. V. Los Angeles: MJV Enterprises, ltd., inc. ISBN 979-8689560397.
- Marek y Villarino de Brugge, André (2021). Alessandro Farnese: Prince of Parma: Governor-General of the Netherlands (1545–1592): Addendum (Rev. ed.). Los Angeles: MJV Enterprises, ltd., inc. ISBN 979-8848038859.
- Pietromarchi, Antonello (1998). Alessandro Farnese l'eroe italiano delle Fiandre. Rome: Gangemi. ISBN 978-887448852-0.
- Tucker, Spencer (2009). A Global Chronology of Conflict: From the Ancient World to the Modern Middle East [6 volumes]: From the Ancient World to the Modern Middle East. ABC-CLIO.

Alexander Farnese, Duke of Parma House of Farnese Born: 27 August 1545 Died: 3 December 1592
Political offices
Preceded by John of Austria	Governor of the Habsburg Netherlands; 1578–1592; Served alongside: Margaret of Parma	Succeeded by Count Peter Ernst von Mansfeld
Italian nobility
Preceded by Ottavio	Duke of Parma and Piacenza; 1586–1592	Succeeded by Ranuccio I
