= Siege of Paris (1590) =

Part of the French Wars of Religion

Coordinates: 48.8566°N 2.3518°E

- Part of the French Wars of Religion
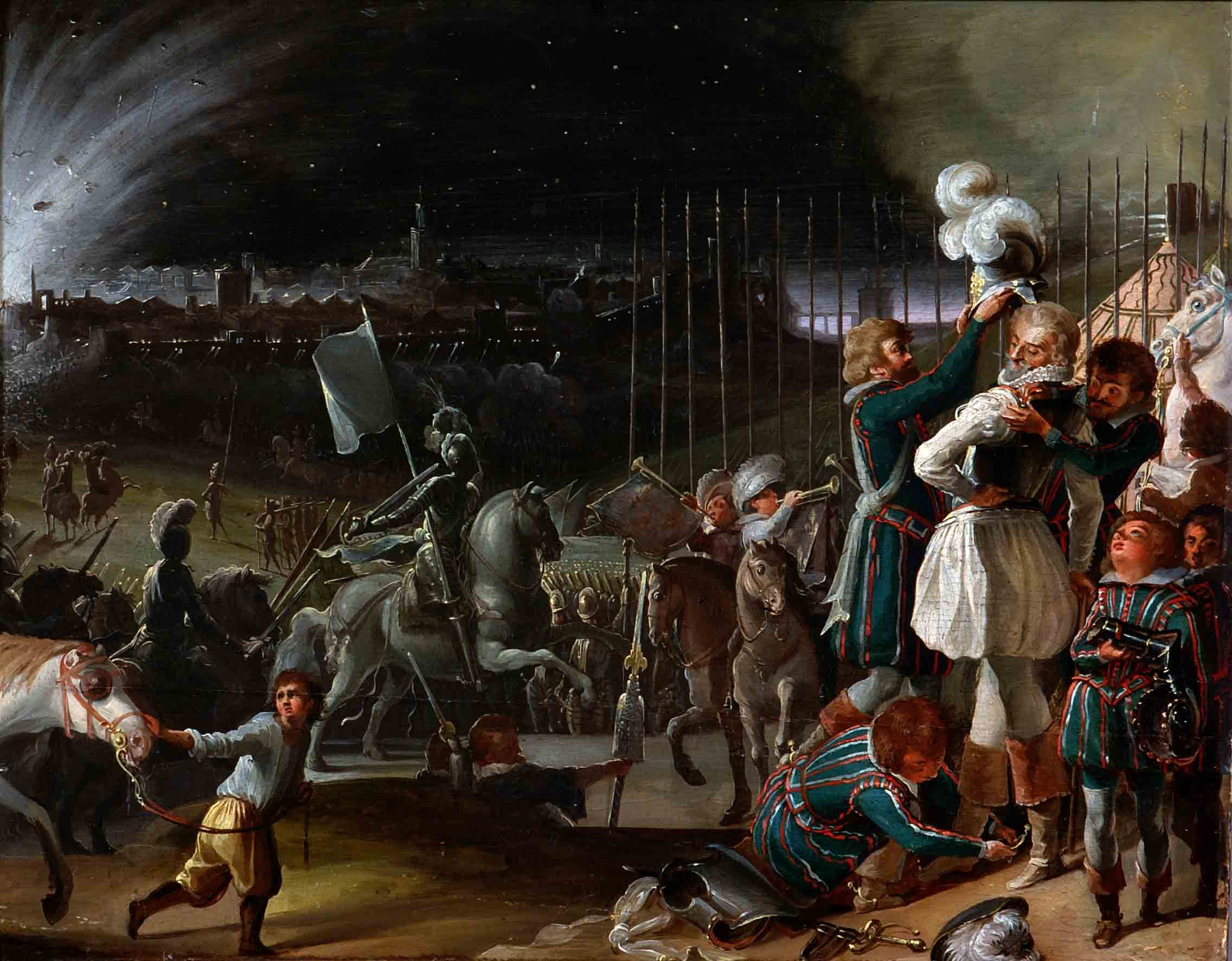
Date	7 May – 30 August 1590
Location	Paris, Kingdom of France
Result	Catholic-Spanish victory

Belligerents
French Royal Army; Kingdom of England; French Huguenot forces	Spanish Empire; Catholic League of France

Commanders and leaders
Henry IV of France; Peregrine Bertie	Alexander Farnese; Charles Emmanuel

Strength
25,000	Defenders: 30,000; Relief army: 15,000

The siege of Paris (7 May – 30 August 1590) took place during the French Wars of Religion when the French Royal Army under Henry of Navarre, and supported by the Huguenots, failed to capture the city of Paris from the Catholic League. Paris was finally relieved from the siege by an international Catholic-Spanish army under the command of Alexander Farnese, Duke of Parma.

== Background ==
After his victory over the Catholic forces commanded by Charles, Duke of Mayenne and Charles of Guise, Duke of Aumale at the Battle of Ivry on 14 March, Henry of Navarre advanced with his troops on his main objective of Paris, possession of which would allow him to confirm his contested claim to the French throne. Paris at the time was a large walled city of around 200,000–220,000 people.

== Siege ==
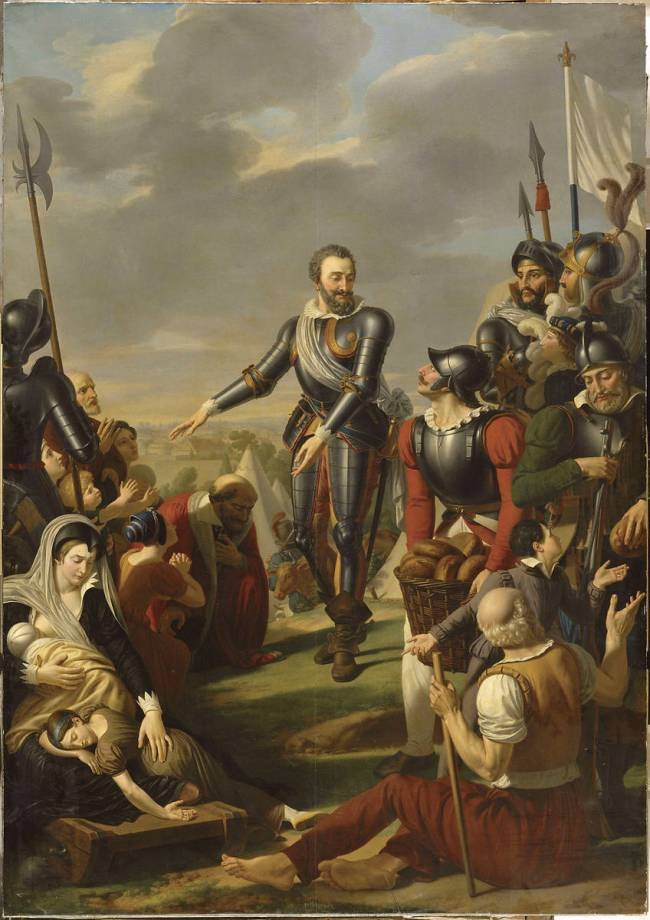
Henry IV before Paris in August 1590, painting by Jean-Charles Tardieu

On 7 May, Henry's army surrounded the city, imposing a blockade and burning windmills to prevent food from reaching Paris. Henry had at this point only around 12,000–13,000 troops, facing defenders estimated at 30,000, mostly militia. Owing to the limited amount of heavy siege artillery that Henry had brought, it was thought that the Catholic city could only be compelled to surrender through starvation. The city's defence was placed in the hands of the young Charles Emmanuel, Duke of Nemours.

Henry set up his artillery on the hills of Montmartre, and bombarded the city from there. In July his force was swelled by reinforcements to 25,000 and by August he had overrun all the suburbs outside the city walls. Henry tried to negotiate the surrender of Paris, but his terms were rejected and the siege continued.

On 30 August, news reached the city that a Spanish–Catholic relief army under the Duke of Parma was on its way. The Duke of Parma's army was able to break the siege and send food supplies into the city. After a final attack on the city's ramparts failed, Henry broke off his siege and retreated on 9 September. An estimated 40,000–50,000 of the population died during the siege, most of starvation. Historians have mentioned that part of the population resorted to cannibalism after all animals had been consumed and Pierre de L'Estoile wrote in his memoirs of those days that people were so desperate that they attempted to make bread with flour made out of human bones.

== Aftermath ==
After repeated failures to take the capital of Paris, Henry IV converted to Catholicism in 1593, reportedly declaring that "Paris is well worth a mass". The war-weary Parisians turned against the Catholic League's hardliners, who insisted on continuing the conflict even after Henry had converted to Catholicism. Paris jubilantly welcomed the formerly Protestant Henry in 1594, and he was crowned King of France that year. Four years later, he issued the Edict of Nantes in an attempt to end the religious strife that had torn the country apart.

== Bibliography ==
- Horne, Alistair. Seven Ages of Paris: Portrait of a City. (2003) Pan Books.
- Holt, Mack P. (2005). The French Wars of Religion (1562–1629). ISBN 0-521-83872-X.
- Knecht, Robert J. (1996). The French Wars of Religion (1559–1598). Seminar Studies in History (2nd ed.). New York: Longman. ISBN 0-582-28533-X.
