= Camisado =

Surprise attack tactic

In military tactics, a camisado or camisade is a surprise attack occurring at night or at daybreak, when the enemy are supposed to be asleep.

The term comes from Spanish camisa (shirt): when the Tercio had actions (skirmishes) of around fifty men attacking at night with minimum equipment, only sword and dagger (although some soldiers could carry arquebus or musket), and they were dressed only with a white shirt (thus the Spanish word es:encamisada), in order to kill in silence as many enemies as possible while they were sleeping. This is reflected in the film Alatriste, based on the main character of The Adventures of Captain Alatriste (Las aventuras del Capitán Alatriste), a series of novels written by Arturo Pérez-Reverte.

== Notable camisados ==
- On 16 December 1332, Scots forces successfully led a surprise attack in the early morning hours against King Edward Balliol and his supporters at the Battle of Annan.
- On 18 July 1539, Ottoman forces landed at Castelnuovo and began the Siege of Castelnuovo. The soldiers of the Tercio of Sarmiento would launch several deadly attacks. The Spanish would even defeat several Janissary units along with routing them in one of the assaults towards the Ottoman camp, which subsequently also forced Hayreddin Barbarossa, the commander of the Ottoman forces in the siege, to leave the camp.
- On 9 October 1544, French forces under the Dauphin assaulted Boulogne by night, but were ultimately unsuccessful.
- On 14 October 1758, General Daun surprised Frederick the Great in the Battle of Hochkirch.
- On 26 December 1776, General George Washington and his Continental Army swiftly defeated the Hessians in the Battle of Trenton.

== Quotations ==
For I this day will lead the forlorn hope,
The camisado shall be given by me.

— The Four Apprentices of London by Thomas Heywood

- (Spanish) Chapter of "la encamisada" in "El sol de Breda"

Music: Song Camisado, A Fever You Can't Sweat Out by Panic! At The Disco
