= Weert, Belgian Limburg =

Weert
- Village
- Location in Belgium
- Coordinates: 50.8283°N 5.5363°E
- Country: Belgium
- Community: Flemish Community
- Province: Limburg
- Municipality: Bilzen

Area
  - Total: 0.88 km^{2} (0.34 sq mi)

Population (2021)
  - Total: 309
  - Density: 350/km^{2} (910/sq mi)
- Time zone: CET

Weert is a village in the Bilzen municipality of the Limburg province in the Flemish Community of Belgium.

The village was first mentioned as Hameau Wert in the 1770s. The village was considered a neighbourhood of Grote-Spouwen, however it was a separate loan of the County of Loon and therefore semi-independent with its own mayor. In 1977, the village became part of the Bilzen municipality.
