= List of battles of the Eighty Years' War =

This is a list of battles of the Eighty Years' War.

== Introduction ==
=== Royalist forces ===
Until August 1567, the government of the Habsburg Netherlands, in the hands of Governor-General Margaret of Parma and her Stadtholders, was using local Netherlandish troops, such as schutterijen as city guards. Military law enforcement included the Bandes d'ordonnance (Dutch: Benden van ordonnantie), elite heavy cavalry formations drawn mostly from the Flemish (Dutch-speaking) and Walloon (French-speaking) aristocracy. The newly created Army of Flanders arrived in the Low Countries in August 1567 under the command of the Duke of Alba, who immediately carried out substantial military reforms. Alba reduced the prominence of the Bandes d'ordonnance (in part because he distrusted the local nobility) in favour of the well-known Habsburg multi-ethnic infantry regiments, the tercios, alongside Spanish light cavalry (the latter comprised just 8% of the army by 1573).

Alba introduced Spanish (Castilian) as the language of communication in the Army of Flanders, and Spaniards received higher pay and most of the key positions in his high command. Alba had a low opinion of soldiers from other ethnicities (called "nations") in the tercios, such as Italians, Flemish and Walloons (flamencos or nativos, as the Spaniards called them), and Germans, and preferred relying on Spanish infantrymen, but the actual share of Spanish soldiers in the Army of Flanders – which was at one of the highest totals of the war during Alba's tenure – was a little over 15%. There were also Burgundian, Scottish, Irish, English and Portuguese "nations" at various stages of the war, and intermittently units from other ethnic backgrounds.

Mutiny due to lack of troop payment was a common problem in the 1570s, which could result in increasing civilian sympathies for the rebel cause (notably the 1576 Sack of Antwerp leading to the Pacification of Ghent), while in the late 1580s and especially 1590s, ethnic tensions between the commanders of the "nations" (such as the Italian Parma, the German Mansfeld and the Spanish Fuentes) led to power struggles that left the Army of Flanders divided and largely paralysed.

=== Rebel forces ===
The rebels, who initiated their first actions of physical force during the Beeldenstorm (August–October 1566, initially mostly directed at Catholic Church property rather than governmental forces) started out as disparate riotous mobs of poorly armed and poorly trained but well-organised Calvinists, originally predominantly from industrial centres in western Flanders. On 14 December 1566, the Habsburg Netherlandish government declared the city of Valenciennes – where Calvinists had seized power – to be "in state of rebellion", and in late December 1566, the first encounter battles occurred between the Habsburg Netherlandish governmental troops and Calvinist rebels. Apart from managing to extend the Siege of Valenciennes (1567) for several months, the Calvinist rebels proved no match for the troops of Margaret of Parma (delegated to stadtholders such as Philip of Noircarmes), who crushed the disturbances in March 1567, before king Philip II sent Alba with the newly formed Army of Flanders from Spain to the Netherlands in April 1567.

During 1568 and 1572, William "the Silent" of Orange, the wealthiest and most powerful nobleman of the Netherlands, attempted two invasions from his Nassau-Dillenburg stronghold as a 'warlord' with mercenary soldiers organised in typical German fashion (here referred to as "Orangist troops") in opposition to Alba, though both met with little success. Meanwhile in 1572, a mixture of groups of noblemen and common people sympathetic to his cause, or to Calvinism, known as Geuzen, formed paramilitary units that seized control of most of Holland and Zeeland, where Calvinists soon came to dominate politics. Orange functioned as minister of war and commander-in-chief of the Hollandic and Zeelandic troops from 1572 on. It was not until 1575 that these units were merged into the Dutch States Army, organised and directed by the States of Holland and West Friesland and the States of Zeeland (which was illegal; only the king had the right to raise armies). Around the same time, starting in 1574 with the Admiralty of Rotterdam, five Dutch admiralties emerged to organise rebel fleets.

When faced with large-scale mutinies in the Army of Flanders in 1576 known as the Spanish Fury, Catholic-dominated provinces of the Netherlands such as Brabant and Flanders (authorised by the Council of State in March 1576) also began raising their own armies in self-defence against mutineers, but were unable to prevent the Sack of Antwerp. With the Pacification of Ghent (8 November 1576) all Seventeen Provinces except Luxemburg would agree to expel all foreign troops from the Habsburg Netherlands (essentially restoring the pre-1567 situation) while establishing a temporary general peace of religion. Although this resulted in much ad hoc cooperation between the rebel provinces and the inclusion of units from all of them into the States Army, organisation initially remained mostly provincial and decentralised, and the rebels suffered a catastrophe at the Battle of Gembloux (1578). Most of the rebel territories would go on to create a closer military alliance with the 1579 Union of Utrecht, proclaim independence by the 1581 Act of Abjuration, obtain English support in 1585 and establish the Dutch Republic in 1588, but the 1579–1588 period was marked by a long series of rebel defeats at the hands of Alexander Farnese, Duke of Parma. Effective military reforms of the Dutch States Army were only introduced by Maurice of Nassau in the subsequent Ten Years (1588–1598). By the 1620s, the annual costs of the Dutch States Army were 11,177,087 guilders, 58% of which were paid by Holland as most populous and wealthy province. By the 1630s, Holland increasingly refused to fund land war operations, pleading for greater maritime expenses against the Dunkirker Privateers instead. This led to tensions with stadtholder Frederick Henry, who unsuccessfully sought to merge the five admiralties into one in 1639, and then resumed his focus on financing the land war.

== List ==
Date	Battle	Region	Rebel forces	Royalist forces	Notes
10 August – October 1566	Beeldenstorm	multiple	Calvinist mobs	(Spanish Empire) Government troops	Inconclusive
14 December 1566 – 23 March 1567	Siege of Valenciennes (1567)	Hainaut	Calvinist rebels	(Spanish Empire) Government troops	Royalist key victory
27 December 1566	Battle of Wattrelos	Flanders	Calvinist rebels	(Spanish Empire) Government troops	Royalist victory
29 December 1566	Battle of Lannoy	Flanders	Calvinist rebels	(Spanish Empire) Government troops	Royalist victory
13 March 1567	Battle of Oosterweel	Brabant	Calvinist rebels	(Spanish Empire) Government troops	Royalist victory
23 April 1568	Battle of Rheindalen	Jülich	Orangist troops	(Spanish Empire) Army of Flanders	Royalist victory
23 May 1568	Battle of Heiligerlee	Groningen	Orangist troops	(Spanish Empire) Army of Flanders	Rebel victory
May–July 1568	Siege of Groningen (1568)	Groningen	Orangist troops	(Spanish Empire) Government troops	Royalist victory
10–11 July 1568	Battle on the Ems	Groningen	Geuzen	(Spanish Empire) Government troops	Rebel victory
21 July 1568	Battle of Jemmingen	East Frisia	Orangist troops	(Spanish Empire) Army of Flanders	Royalist victory
20 October 1568	Battle of Jodoigne	Brabant	Orangist troops	(Spanish Empire) Army of Flanders	Royalist victory
12 November 1568	Battle of Le Quesnoy	Hainaut	Orangist troops	(Spanish Empire) Army of Flanders	Rebel victory
9–19 December 1570	Battle of Loevestein	Guelders	Geuzen	(Spanish Empire) Army of Flanders	Royalist victory
1 April 1572	Capture of Brielle	Holland	Geuzen	(Spanish Empire) Army of Flanders	Rebel victory
6 April 1572	Flushing rebellion	Zeeland	Civic militia	(Spanish Empire) Army of Flanders	Rebel victory
23 June – 19 September 1572	Siege of Mons (1572)	Hainaut	Orangist troops	(Spanish Empire) Army of Flanders	Royalist victory
17 July 1572	Battle of Saint-Ghislain	Hainaut	Huguenot troops	(Spanish Empire) Army of Flanders	Royalist victory
12 August 1572 – 8 February 1578	Blockades of Amsterdam	Holland	Geuzen	(Spanish Empire) Army of Flanders	Rebel victory
12–15 September 1572	Walloon Fury in Dokkum	Friesland	Geuzen	(Spanish Empire) Army of Flanders	Royalist victory
2 October 1572	Spanish Fury at Mechelen	Mechelen	Orangist troops	(Spanish Empire) Army of Flanders	Royalist victory
? 1572	The Battle of Ijsselmeer	Holland	Geuzen	(Spanish Empire) Army of Flanders	Rebel victory
20 October 1572	Relief of Goes	Zeeland	Geuzen (England) English navy	(Spanish Empire) Army of Flanders	Royalist victory
22 October 1572	Massacre of Naarden	Holland	Geuzen	(Spanish Empire) Army of Flanders	Royalist victory
4 November 1572 – 18 February 1574	Siege of Middelburg (1572–1574)	Zeeland	Geuzen (England) English navy	(Spanish Empire) Army of Flanders	Rebel victory
16 November 1572	Massacre of Zutphen	Guelders	Orangist troops	(Spanish Empire) Army of Flanders	Royalist victory
11 December 1572 – 13 July 1573	Siege of Haarlem	Holland	Geuzen	(Spanish Empire) Army of Flanders	Royalist victory
17 April 1573	Battle of Flushing	Zeeland	Geuzen	(Spanish Empire) Army of Flanders	Rebel victory
11 October 1573	Battle of Borsele	Zeeland	Geuzen	(Spanish Empire) Army of Flanders	Rebel victory
22 April 1573	Battle on the Zuiderzee	Zuiderzee	Geuzen	(Spanish Empire) Army of Flanders	Rebel victory
21 August – 8 October 1573	Siege of Alkmaar	Holland	Geuzen	(Spanish Empire) Army of Flanders	Rebel victory
28 August 1573	Capture of Geertruidenberg (1573)	Holland	Geuzen; Huguenot troops (England) English navy	(Spanish Empire) Army of Flanders	Rebel victory
October 1573	Battle of Delft (1573)	Holland	Geuzen (England) English troops	(Spanish Empire) Army of Flanders	Rebel victory
October 1573 – 3 October 1574	Siege of Leiden	Holland	Geuzen	(Spanish Empire) Army of Flanders	Rebel key victory
27/29 January 1574	Battle of the Scheldt (1574) (Battle of Reimerswaal)	Zeeland	Geuzen (England) English navy	(Spanish Empire) Army of Flanders	Rebel victory
Early February 1574	Capture of Valkenburg (1574)	Holland	Geuzen (England) English troops	(Spanish Empire) Army of Flanders	Royalist victory
14 April 1574	Battle of Mookerheyde	Cleves	Orangist troops	(Spanish Empire) Army of Flanders	Royalist victory
30 May 1574	Battle of Lillo	Brabant	Geuzen	(Spanish Empire) Army of Flanders	Rebel victory
19 July – 7 August 1575	Siege of Oudewater (1575)	Utrecht	Geuzen	(Spanish Empire) Army of Flanders	Royalist victory
11–24 August 1575	Siege of Schoonhoven (1575)	Holland	Geuzen (England) English troops Huguenot troops	(Spanish Empire) Army of Flanders	Royalist victory
October 1575 – 29 June 1576	Siege of Zierikzee	Zeeland	Geuzen	(Spanish Empire) Army of Flanders	Royalist victory
25 July 1576	Sack of Aalst	Flanders	City guard	Spanish mutineers	Mutineer victory
14 September 1576	Battle of Vissenaken	Brabant	Brabantian troops	Spanish mutineers	Mutineer victory
15 September – 11 November 1576	Siege of the Spanjaardenkasteel	Flanders	Brabantian troops Flemish troops Hollandic troops	Spanish mutineers	Rebel victory
4–7 November 1576	Sack of Antwerp	Brabant	Brabantian troops German/Walloon troops Armed citizens	Spanish mutineers	Mutineer victory
December 1576 – February 1577	Siege of Vredenburg	Utrecht	City guard German troops	Spanish mutineers	Rebel victory
24 July 1577	Capture of the Namur citadel	Namur	Dutch States Army	(Spanish Empire) Army of Flanders	Royalist victory (Coup d'état)
1–2 August 1577	Capture of the Antwerp citadel	Brabant	Dutch States Army	German mutineers	Rebel victory
4 August – 4 October 1577	Siege of Breda (1577)	Brabant	Dutch States Army	(Spanish Empire) German mercenaries	Rebel victory
28 October 1577	Ghent Calvinist coup	Flanders	Dutch States Army Ghent Calvinists		Calvinist victory (Coup d'état)
31 January 1578	Battle of Gembloux	Brabant	Dutch States Army	(Spanish Empire) Army of Flanders	Royalist key victory
20–24 February 1578	Siege of Zichem	Brabant	Dutch States Army	(Spanish Empire) Army of Flanders	Royalist victory
8–12 March 1578	Siege of Nivelles (Dutch) (French)	Brabant	Dutch States Army	(Spanish Empire) Army of Flanders	Royalist victory
26 May 1578	Alteratie of Amsterdam	Holland	Catholic city council Calvinist radicals Former Geuzen		Calvinist victory (Coup d'état)
25 June – 20 July 1578	Siege of Kampen (1578)	Overijssel	Dutch States Army	(Spanish Empire) German mercenaries	Rebel victory
31 July 1578	Battle of Rijmenam	Brabant	Dutch States Army	(Spanish Empire) Army of Flanders	Rebel victory
3 August – 19 November 1578	Siege of Deventer (1578)	Overijssel	Dutch States Army	(Spanish Empire) German mercenaries	Rebel victory
22 September – 7 October 1578	Siege of Binche	Hainaut	Dutch States Army	(Spanish Empire) Army of Flanders	Rebel victory
2 March 1579	Battle of Borgerhout	Flanders	(England) English troops (Scotland) Scottish troops Huguenot troops	(Spanish Empire) Army of Flanders	Royalist victory
8/12 March – 29 June/1 July 1579	Siege of Maastricht	Limburg	Dutch States Army	(Spanish Empire) Army of Flanders	Royalist victory
29 March 1579	Street battle in Mechelen	Mechelen	Dutch States Army: Hollandic troops; Calvinist armed citizens	Catholic armed citizens	Royalist victory
1 July 1579	Schermersoproer in Den Bosch	Brabant	Calvinist city guard	Catholic guilds	Royalist victory
3 March – 18 June 1580	Siege of Groningen (1580)	Groningen	Dutch States Army	(Spanish Empire) Rennenberg troops	Royalist victory (Coup d'état)
9 April 1580	English Fury at Mechelen	Mechelen	Dutch States Army (England) English troops	(Spanish Empire) Army of Flanders; City guard	Rebel victory
9 June 1580	Taking of Diest (1580)	Brabant	Dutch States Army; Huguenot troops	(Spanish Empire) Army of Flanders	Rebel victory
15–16 June 1580	Zwolle riot	Overijssel	Calvinist city guard Kampen Calvinists	Catholic armed citizens Catholic farmers	Calvinist victory
17 June 1580	Battle of Hardenberg	Overijssel	Dutch States Army	(Spanish Empire) Army of Flanders	Royalist victory
18 October 1580 – 23 February 1581	Siege of Steenwijk (1580–1581)	Overijssel	Dutch States Army	(Spanish Empire) Army of Flanders	Royalist victory
September 1580 – 17 Augustus 1581	Siege of Cambrai (1581)	Cambrésis	Anjou troops Dutch States Army	(Spanish Empire) Army of Flanders	Rebel victory
19 July 1581	Battle of Kollum	Friesland	Dutch States Army (England) English troops	(Spanish Empire) Army of Flanders	Rebel victory
26–27 July 1581	Capture of Breda (1581)	Brabant	Dutch States Army; City guard	(Spanish Empire) Army of Flanders	Royalist victory
30 September 1581	Battle of Noordhorn	Groningen	Dutch States Army (England) English troops (Scotland) Scottish troops	(Spanish Empire) Army of Flanders	Royalist victory
3–24 October 1581	Siege of Niezijl	Groningen	Dutch States Army (England) English troops	(Spanish Empire) Army of Flanders	Rebel victory
10 October – 30 November 1581	Siege of Tournai (1581)	Tournaisis	Dutch States Army	(Spanish Empire) Army of Flanders	Royalist victory
22 July – 15 September 1582	Siege of Lochem (1582)	Guelders	Dutch States Army (England) English troops Huguenot troops	(Spanish Empire) Army of Flanders	Rebel victory
26 July 1582	Battle of Ponta Delgada (also part of the War of the Portuguese Succession)	Azores	Pro-Crato Portugal; Dutch States Fleet; France; England	Pro-Philip Portugal (Spain) Spanish Empire	Royalist victory (Pro-Philip victory)
1–2 August 1582	Siege of Lier (1582)	Brabant	Dutch States Army (England) English troops	(Spanish Empire) Army of Flanders	Royalist victory
17 January 1583	French Fury	Brabant	Dutch States Army Anjou troops		States victory (Failed coup)
7 February – 23 April 1583	Siege of Eindhoven (1583)	Brabant	Dutch States Army; Anjou troops (Kingdom of Scotland) Scottish troops	(Spanish Empire) Army of Flanders	Royalist victory
17 June 1583	Battle of Steenbergen (1583)	Brabant	Dutch States Army; Anjou troops (Kingdom of England) English troops	(Spanish Empire) Army of Flanders	Royalist victory
October 1583 – 17 September 1584	Siege of Ghent (1583–1584)	Flanders	Calvinist Republic of Ghent	(Spanish Empire) Army of Flanders; Malcontents	Royalist victory
Early February 1584	Capture of Aalst (1584)	Flanders	Dutch States Army (Kingdom of England) English troops	(Spanish Empire) Army of Flanders	Royalist victory
May–July 1584	Siege of Zutphen (1584)	Guelders	Dutch States Army	(Spanish Empire) Army of Flanders	Royalist victory
July 1584 – 17 August 1585	Siege of Antwerp	Brabant	Dutch States Army	(Spanish Empire) Army of Flanders	Royalist key victory
6–15 October 1585	Siege of IJsseloord	Guelders	Dutch States Army (Kingdom of England) English troops	(Spanish Empire) Army of Flanders	Rebel victory (Anglo-Dutch victory)
4–8 December 1585	Battle of Empel	Brabant	Dutch fleet	(Spanish Empire) Army of Flanders	Royalist victory
17 January 1586	Battle of Boksum	Friesland	Dutch States Army	(Spanish Empire) Army of Flanders	Royalist victory
Early April – 7 June 1586	Siege of Grave (1586)	Brabant	Dutch States Army (Kingdom of England) English troops	(Spanish Empire) Army of Flanders	Royalist victory
June 1586	Siege of Venlo (1586)	Guelders	Dutch States Army (Kingdom of England) English troops	(Spanish Empire) Army of Flanders	Royalist victory
17 July 1586	Capture of Axel	Flanders	Dutch States Army (Kingdom of England) English soldiers	(Spanish Empire) Army of Flanders	Rebel victory
26 July 1586	Destruction of Neuss	Cologne	(Electorate of Cologne) Truchsess Cologne (Dutch Republic) Dutch States Army	(Electorate of Cologne) Ernest Cologne (Spanish Empire) Army of Flanders	Royalist victory (Ernest-Spanish victory)
13 August 1586 – 3 February 1590	Siege of Rheinberg (1586–1590)	Cologne	(Electorate of Cologne) Truchsess Cologne (Dutch Republic) Dutch States Army	(Electorate of Cologne) Ernest Cologne (Spanish Empire) Army of Flanders	Royalist victory (Ernest-Spanish victory)
22 September 1586	Battle of Zutphen (Battle of Warnsveld)	Guelders	Dutch States Army (Kingdom of England) English soldiers	(Spanish Empire) Army of Flanders	Royalist victory
12 June – 4 August 1587	Siege of Sluis (1587)	Flanders	Dutch States Army (Kingdom of England) English troops	(Spanish Empire) Army of Flanders	Royalist victory
27 February – 29 April 1588	Siege of Medemblik (1588)	Holland	(Dutch Republic) States Army (England) Leicester troops		States victory (Failed coup)
29 July 1588	Battle of Gravelines	Channel	(Kingdom of England) English Royal Navy; Dutch Republic Fleet	(Spanish Empire) Spanish Armada (Spanish Empire) Army of Flanders	Rebel key victory (Anglo-Dutch victory)
23 September – 13 November 1588	Siege of Bergen op Zoom (1588)	Brabant	(Dutch Republic) Dutch States Army (Kingdom of England) English troops	(Spanish Empire) Army of Flanders	Rebel key victory (Anglo-Dutch victory)
10 April 1589	Capture of Geertruidenberg (1589)	Holland	(Dutch Republic) Dutch States Army (Kingdom of England) English troops	(Spanish Empire) Army of Flanders	Royalist victory
Early 1590	Battle of Bayona Islands (1590)	Spain	Dutch Republic (England) Royal Navy	(Spanish Empire) Army of Flanders	Royalist victory
4 March 1590	Capture of Breda (1590)	Brabant	(Dutch Republic) Dutch States Army	(Spanish Empire) Army of Flanders	Rebel victory
19–30 May 1591	Siege of Zutphen (1591)	Guelders	(Dutch Republic) Dutch States Army (Kingdom of England) English troops	(Spanish Empire) Army of Flanders	Rebel victory (Anglo-Dutch victory)
1–10 June 1591	Siege of Deventer (1591)	Overijssel	(Dutch Republic) Dutch States Army (Kingdom of England) English troops	(Spanish Empire) Army of Flanders	Rebel victory (Anglo-Dutch victory)
30 June – 15 July 1596	Capture of Cádiz	Spain	Dutch Republic (England) Royal Navy	Spanish Empire	Rebel victory (Anglo-Dutch victory)
2 July 1591	Capture of Delfzijl	Groningen	(Dutch Republic) Dutch States Army (Kingdom of England) English troops	(Spanish Empire) Army of Flanders	Rebel victory (Anglo-Dutch victory)
15–25 July 1591	Siege of Knodsenburg	Guelders	(Dutch Republic) Dutch States Army (Kingdom of England) English troops	(Spanish Empire) Army of Flanders	Rebel victory (Anglo-Dutch victory)
Late August 1591	Battle of the Gulf of Almería (1591)	Spain	Dutch Republic (England) Royal Navy	Spanish Empire	Royalist victory
20–24 September 1591	Siege of Hulst (1591)	Flanders	(Dutch Republic) Dutch States Army (Kingdom of England) English troops	(Spanish Empire) Army of Flanders	Rebel victory (Anglo-Dutch victory)
17–21 October 1591	Siege of Nijmegen (1591)	Guelders	(Dutch Republic) Dutch States Army	(Spanish Empire) Army of Flanders	Rebel victory
December 1591 – May 1592	Siege of Rouen (1591–1592)	France	Henry of Navarre (Kingdom of England) English troops Dutch Republic	(Spanish Empire) Army of Flanders; Catholic League	Royalist victory (Spanish-Catholic victory)
24 April – 21 May 1592	Siege of Caudebec	France	Henry of Navarre (Kingdom of England) English troops (Dutch Republic) Dutch fleet	(Spanish Empire) Army of Flanders; Catholic League	Rebel victory (Navarre-Anglo-Dutch or 'Protestant' victory)
30 May – 5 July 1592	Siege of Steenwijk (1592)	Overijssel	(Dutch Republic) Dutch States Army (Kingdom of England) English troops	(Spanish Empire) Army of Flanders	Rebel victory (Anglo-Dutch victory)
26 July – 2 September 1592	Siege of Coevorden (1592)	Drenthe	(Dutch Republic) Dutch States Army (Kingdom of England) English troops	(Spanish Empire) Army of Flanders	Rebel victory (Anglo-Dutch victory)
14 January – 10 February 1593	1593 Luxemburg campaign Siege of Sankt Vith	Luxemburg	(Dutch Republic) Dutch States Army; Duchy of Bouillon; Kingdom of France	(Spanish Empire) Army of Flanders	Royalist tactical victory Rebel strategic victory
27 March – 24 June 1593	Siege of Geertruidenberg (1593)	Holland	(Dutch Republic) Dutch States Army	(Spanish Empire) Army of Flanders	Rebel victory
28 October 1593 – 6 May 1594	Siege of Coevorden (1593)	Drenthe	(Dutch Republic) Dutch States Army (Kingdom of England) English troops	(Spanish Empire) Army of Flanders	Rebel victory (Anglo-Dutch victory)
19 May – 22 July 1594	Siege of Groningen (1594)	Groningen	(Dutch Republic) Dutch States Army	(Spanish Empire) Army of Flanders	Rebel key victory
January–June 1595	1595 Luxemburg campaign Siege of Huy (1595)	Luxemburg; Liège	(Dutch Republic) Dutch States Army; Duchy of Bouillon	(Spanish Empire) Army of Flanders; Bishopric of Liège	Royalist victory
2 September 1595	Battle of the Lippe	Cologne	(Dutch Republic) Dutch States Army (Kingdom of England) English troops	(Spanish Empire) Army of Flanders	Royalist victory
11–28 September 1595	Siege of Groenlo (1595)	Guelders	(Dutch Republic) Dutch States Army (Kingdom of England) English troops	(Spanish Empire) Army of Flanders	Royalist victory
14 October 1595	Sack of Lier	Brabant	(Dutch Republic) Dutch States Army	(Spanish Empire) Army of Flanders	Royalist victory
8–24 April 1596	Siege of Calais (1596)	France	(Kingdom of France) Henry of Navarre (Kingdom of England) English troops (Dutch Republic) Dutch troops	(Spanish Empire) Army of Flanders	Royalist victory
Mid-July – 18 August 1596	Siege of Hulst (1596)	Flanders	(Dutch Republic) Dutch States Army (Kingdom of England) English troops	(Spanish Empire) Army of Flanders	Royalist victory
24 January 1597	Battle of Turnhout	Brabant	(Dutch Republic) Dutch States Army	(Spanish Empire) Army of Flanders	Rebel victory
June – August 1597	Islands Voyage	Azores	Dutch Republic (England) Royal Navy	Spanish Empire	Royalist victory
9–19 August 1597	Siege of Rheinberg (1597)	Cologne	(Dutch Republic) Dutch States Army (Kingdom of England) English troops	(Spanish Empire) Army of Flanders	Rebel victory (Anglo-Dutch victory)
29 August – 3 September 1597	Siege of Meurs (1597)	Moers	(Dutch Republic) Dutch States Army (Kingdom of England) English troops	(Spanish Empire) Army of Flanders	Rebel victory (Anglo-Dutch victory)
11–28 September 1597	Siege of Groenlo (1597)	Guelders	(Dutch Republic) Dutch States Army	(Spanish Empire) Army of Flanders	Rebel victory
1–9 October 1597	Siege of Bredevoort (1597)	Guelders	(Dutch Republic) Dutch States Army	(Spanish Empire) Army of Flanders	Rebel victory
1–10 October 1597	Siege of Bredevoort (1597)	Guelders	(Dutch Republic) Dutch States Army (Kingdom of England) English troops	(Spanish Empire) Army of Flanders	Rebel victory (Anglo-Dutch victory)
18–19 October 1597	Capture of Enschede (1597)	Overijssel	(Dutch Republic) Dutch States Army (Kingdom of England) English troops	(Spanish Empire) Army of Flanders	Rebel victory (Anglo-Dutch victory)
19–21 October 1597	Capture of Ootmarsum	Overijssel	(Dutch Republic) Dutch States Army (Kingdom of England) English troops	(Spanish Empire) Army of Flanders	Rebel victory (Anglo-Dutch victory)
20–23 October 1597	Siege of Oldenzaal (1597)	Overijssel	(Dutch Republic) Dutch States Army (Kingdom of England) English troops	(Spanish Empire) Army of Flanders	Rebel victory (Anglo-Dutch victory)
25 October – 12 November 1597	Siege of Lingen (1597)	Overijssel	(Dutch Republic) Dutch States Army (Kingdom of England) English troops	(Spanish Empire) Army of Flanders	Rebel victory (Anglo-Dutch victory)
28 April – 2 May 1599	Siege of Schenckenschans (1599)	Guelders	(Dutch Republic) Dutch States Army (Kingdom of England) English troops	(Spanish Empire) Army of Flanders	Rebel victory (Anglo-Dutch victory)
15 May – 22 July 1599	Siege of Zaltbommel	Guelders	(Dutch Republic) Dutch States Army (Kingdom of England) English troops	(Spanish Empire) Army of Flanders	Rebel victory (Anglo-Dutch victory)
10–12 September 1599	Siege of Rees (1599)	Cleves	(Dutch Republic) Dutch States Army (Holy Roman Empire) Lower Saxon Circle	(Spanish Empire) Army of Flanders	Royalist victory
28 January – 6 March 1600	Siege of San Andreas (1600)	Guelders	(Dutch Republic) Dutch States Army (England) English troops	(Spanish Empire) Army of Flanders	Rebel victory (Anglo-Dutch victory)
5 February 1600	Battle of Lekkerbeetje	Brabant	(Dutch Republic) Dutch States Army	(Spanish Empire) Army of Flanders	Royalist victory
2 July 1600	Battle of Nieuwpoort	Flanders	(Dutch Republic) Dutch States Army	(Spanish Empire) Army of Flanders	Rebel tactical victory
12 June – 2 August 1601	Siege of Rheinberg (1601)	Cologne	(Dutch Republic) Dutch States Army (England) English troops	(Spanish Empire) Army of Flanders	Rebel victory (Anglo-Dutch victory)
5 July 1601 – 20 September 1604	Siege of Ostend	Flanders	(Dutch Republic) Dutch States Army	(Spanish Empire) Army of Flanders	Royalist key victory
1–27 November 1601	Siege of 's-Hertogenbosch (1601)	Brabant	(Dutch Republic) Dutch States Army (England) English troops	(Spanish Empire) Army of Flanders	Royalist victory
18 July – 20 September 1602	Siege of Grave (1602)	Brabant	(Dutch Republic) Dutch States Army (England) English troops	(Spanish Empire) Army of Flanders	Rebel victory (Anglo-Dutch victory)
1 September 1602 – 18 May 1604	Mutiny of Hoogstraten	Brabant	(Dutch Republic) Dutch States Army (England) English troops (Spanish Empire) Spanish mutineers	(Spanish Empire) Army of Flanders	Rebel victory (Mutineer–allied victory)
3–4 October 1602	Battle of the Narrow Seas (Battle of the Dover Straits)	Channel	Dutch Republic (England) Royal Navy	Spanish Empire	Rebel victory (Anglo-Dutch victory)
26 May 1603	Battle of Sluis	Flanders	Dutch Republic Fleet	(Spanish Empire) Army of Flanders	Rebel victory
19 May – 19 August 1604	Siege of Sluis (1604)	Flanders	Dutch Republic Fleet	(Spanish Empire) Army of Flanders	Rebel victory
10–19 August 1605	Siege of Lingen (1605)	Overijssel	Dutch Republic Fleet	(Spanish Empire) Army of Flanders	Royalist victory
16 June or 6 October 1606	Battle of Cape St. Vincent (1606)	Portugal	Dutch Republic Fleet	(Spanish Empire) Army of Flanders	Royalist victory
3–14 August 1606 (royalists); 30 Oct. – 9 Nov. 1606 (rebels)	Siege of Groenlo (1606)	Guelders	Dutch Republic Fleet	(Spanish Empire) Army of Flanders	Royalist victory
25 April 1607	Battle of Gibraltar (1607)	Spain	Dutch Republic Fleet	Spanish Empire	Rebel victory
28 July – 2 September 1610	Siege of Jülich (1610)	Jülich	Dutch Republic; Kingdom of France; Palatinate-Neuburg; Brandenburg	(Holy Roman Empire) Imperial Army	Rebel victory (Franco-Dutch victory)
Late August 1614	Siege of Aachen (1614)	Aachen	Free City of Aachen; Brandenburg	(Spanish Empire) Army of Flanders	Royalist victory
15 April 1617	Battle of Playa Honda	Philippines	Dutch Republic Fleet	Spanish Empire	Royalist victory
21 August 1621	Battle of Gibraltar (1621)	Spain	Dutch Republic Fleet; Denmark–Norway	Spanish Empire	Royalist victory
5 September 1621 – 3 February 1622	Siege of Jülich (1621–1622)	Jülich	(Dutch Republic) Dutch States Army	(Spanish Empire) Army of Flanders	Royalist victory
8 July – 2 October 1622	Siege of Bergen op Zoom (1622)	Brabant	(Dutch Republic) Dutch States Army	(Spanish Empire) Army of Flanders	Rebel victory
29 August 1622	Battle of Fleurus (1622)	Hainaut	(Dutch Republic) Dutch States Army; German soldiers	(Spanish Empire) Army of Flanders	Royalist victory
28 August 1624 – 5 June 1625	Siege of Breda (1624)	Brabant	(Dutch Republic) Dutch States Army	(Spanish Empire) Army of Flanders	Royalist key victory
1 April – 1 May 1625	Recapture of Salvador	Brazil	Dutch Republic: WIC	Spanish Empire; Portuguese Empire	Royalist victory
24 September – 2 November 1625	Battle of San Juan (1625)	Antilles	Dutch Republic	Spanish Empire: (Spain) Puerto Rico	Royalist victory
1–7 November 1625	Cádiz expedition (1625)	Spain	Dutch Republic (England) Royal Navy	Spanish Empire	Royalist victory
25 July – 1 August 1626	Siege of Oldenzaal (1626)	Overijssel	(Dutch Republic) Dutch States Army (England) English troops	(Spanish Empire) Army of Flanders	Rebel victory (Anglo-Dutch victory)
20 July – 19 August 1627	Siege of Groenlo (1627)	Guelders	(Dutch Republic) Dutch States Army	(Spanish Empire) Army of Flanders	Rebel victory
7–8 September 1628	Battle in the Bay of Matanzas	Cuba	Dutch Republic Fleet	(Spanish Empire) Treasure fleet	Rebel key victory
30 April – 14 September 1629	Siege of 's-Hertogenbosch	Brabant	(Dutch Republic) Dutch States Army	(Spanish Empire) Army of Flanders	Rebel key victory
12 September 1631	Battle of Abrolhos	Brazil	Dutch Republic: WIC	Spanish Empire; Portuguese Empire	Royalist victory
12–13 September 1631	Battle of the Slaak	Holland	Dutch Republic	Spanish Empire	Rebel victory
9 June – 22 August 1632	Capture of Maastricht	Limburg	(Dutch Republic) Dutch States Army	(Spanish Empire) Army of Flanders	Rebel key victory
25 June – 1 July 1633	Capture of Saint Martin (1633)	Antilles	Dutch Republic	Spanish Empire	Royalist victory
11 June – 2 July 1633	Siege of Rheinberg (1633)	Cologne	(Dutch Republic) Dutch States Army	(Spanish Empire) Army of Flanders	Rebel victory
8–20 May 1635	Siege of Philippine	Flanders	(Dutch Republic) Dutch States Army	(Spanish Empire) Army of Flanders	Rebel victory
20 May 1635	Battle of Les Avins	Liège	Kingdom of France	(Spanish Empire) Army of Flanders	Rebel victory (French victory)
8–10 June 1635	Sack of Tienen	Brabant	(Dutch Republic) Dutch States Army; Kingdom of France	(Spanish Empire) Army of Flanders	Rebel victory (Franco-Dutch victory)
24 June – 4 July 1635	Siege of Leuven	Brabant	(Dutch Republic) Dutch States Army; Kingdom of France	(Spanish Empire) Army of Flanders; Holy Roman Empire	Royalist victory
30 July 1635 – 30 April 1636	Siege of Schenkenschans	Guelders	(Dutch Republic) Dutch States Army	(Spanish Empire) Army of Flanders	Rebel victory
18 February 1637	Battle off Lizard Point	England	Dutch Republic	Spanish Empire	Royalist victory
20–25 August 1637	Siege of Venlo (1637)	Guelders	(Dutch Republic) Dutch States Army	(Spanish Empire) Army of Flanders	Royalist victory
21 July – 11 October 1637	Siege of Breda (1637)	Brabant	(Dutch Republic) Dutch States Army	(Spanish Empire) Army of Flanders	Rebel victory
April – May 1638	Siege of Salvador (1638)	Brazil	Dutch Republic: WIC	Spanish Empire; Portuguese Empire	Royalist victory
20–22 June 1638	Battle of Kallo	Brabant	(Dutch Republic) Dutch States Army	(Spanish Empire) Army of Flanders	Royalist key victory
18 February 1639	Action of 18 February 1639	North Sea	Dutch Republic	Spanish Empire	Rebel victory
18 September 1639	Action of 18 September 1639	Channel	Dutch Republic	Spanish Empire	Inconclusive
21 October 1639 N.S.	Battle of the Downs	Channel	Dutch Republic Fleet	(Spanish Empire) "Second Armada"	Rebel key victory
12–17 January 1640	Action of 12–17 January 1640	Brazil	Dutch Republic: WIC	Spanish Empire; Portuguese Empire	Rebel victory
August 1641	Battle of San Salvador (1641)	Brazil	Dutch Republic	Spanish Empire: East Indies	Rebel strategic victory
4 November 1641	Battle of Cape St. Vincent (1641)	Portugal	Dutch Republic	Spanish Empire	Inconclusive
August 1642	Battle of San Salvador (1642)	Brazil	Dutch Republic	Spanish Empire: East Indies	Rebel victory
6 November 1642 – 28 December 1643	Dutch expedition to Valdivia	Chile	Dutch Republic	Spanish Empire	Royalist victory
20 March – 17 April 1644	Attack on Saint Martin	Antilles	Dutch Republic	Spanish Empire	Royalist victory
7 October – 4 November 1645	Siege of Hulst (1645)	Flanders	(Dutch Republic) Dutch States Army	(Spanish Empire) Army of Flanders	Rebel victory
15 March – 4 October 1646	Battles of La Naval de Manila	Philippines	Dutch Republic: VOC	Spanish Empire: East Indies	Royalist victory
October 1646	Siege of Venlo (1646)	Guelders	(Dutch Republic) Dutch States Army	(Spanish Empire) Army of Flanders	Royalist victory
10 June 1647	Battle of Puerto de Cavite	Philippines	Dutch Republic Fleet	Spanish Empire	Royalist victory

== See also ==
- Anglo-Spanish War (1585–1604)
- Dutch conquest of the Banda Islands (1609–1621)
- Dutch–Portuguese War (1602–1663)
- Franco-Spanish War (1635–1659)
- Succession of Henry IV of France (August 1589 – March 1594), war into which Alexander Farnese, Duke of Parma was sent to intervene in September 1589

== Bibliography ==
- Geyl, Pieter. (1932), The Revolt of the Netherlands, 1555–1609. Williams & Norgate, UK.
- Groenveld, Simon; Leeuwenberg, Huib (2020). De Tachtigjarige Oorlog. Opstand en consolidatie in de Nederlanden (ca. 1560–1650). Derde editie (in Dutch). Zutphen: Walburg Pers. p. 750. ISBN 9789462495661. (e-book; original publication 2008; in cooperation with M. Mout and W. Zappey)
- Israel, Jonathan (1998). The Dutch Republic: Its Rise, Greatness, and Fall 1477–1806. Oxford: Clarendon Press. pp. 155–230. ISBN 0-19-820734-4.
- Koenigsberger, Helmut G. (2007). Monarchies, States Generals and Parliaments. The Netherlands in the fifteenth and sixteenth centurie. Cambridge University Press. ISBN 978-0-521-04437-0. [2001] paperback
- van der Lem, Anton (1995). De Opstand in de Nederlanden (1555–1648) (in Dutch). Uitgeverij Kosmos / Leiden University.
- de León, Fernando González (2009). The Road to Rocroi: Class, Culture and Command in the Spanish Army of Flanders, 1567–1659. Leiden: Brill. pp. 89–97. ISBN 9789047424130.
- Parker, Geoffrey (1990). The Dutch Revolt. Second Edition. London: Penguin Books.
- Swart, Erik (2006). Krijgsvolk. Militaire professionalisering en het ontstaan van het Staatse leger, 1568–1590 (PDF) (in Dutch). Amsterdam: Amsterdam University Press. p. 278. ISBN 978-90-5356-876-7. (Dissertation)
- Tracy, J.D. (2008). The Founding of the Dutch Republic: War, Finance, and Politics in Holland 1572–1588. Oxford University Press. ISBN 978-0-19-920911-8.
- Van der Wee, Herman (1969). "De economie als factor bij het begin van de opstand in de Zuidelijke Nederlanden door Herman van der Wee". BMGN: Low Countries Historical Review. 83. Royal Netherlands Historical Society: 15–32.
