= Korbeek-Lo =

- Sub-municipality of Bierbeek
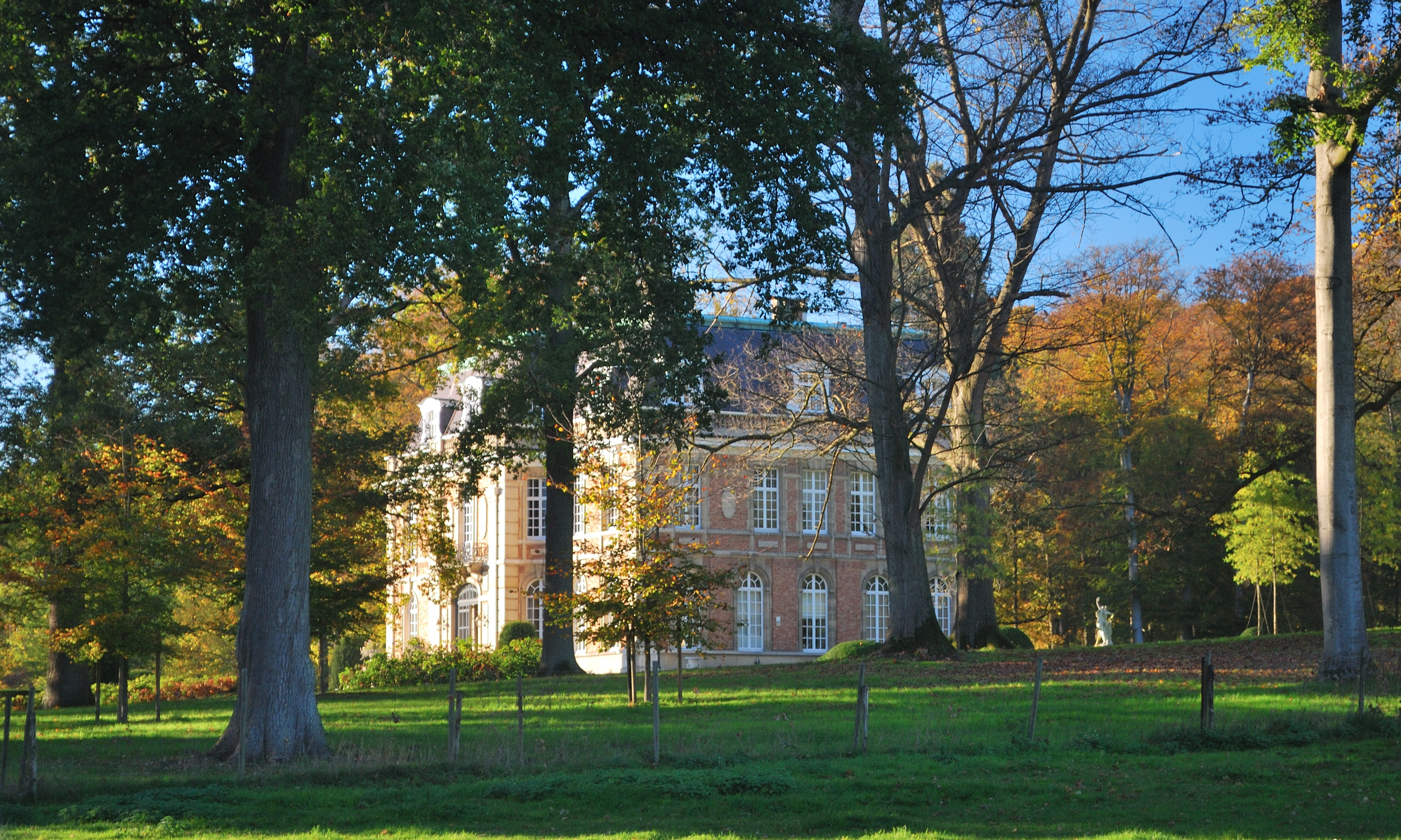
- Hottat castle and park
- Interactive map of Korbeek-Lo
- Location within Belgium Location within Flemish Brabant
- Coordinates: 50°51′39″N 4°45′56″E
- Country: Belgium
- Community: Flemish Community
- Region: Flemish Region
- Province: Flemish Brabant
- Arrondissement: Leuven
- Municipality: Bierbeek

Area
  - Total: 3.66 km^{2} (1.41 sq mi)

Population (2020-01-01)
  - Total: 3,669
  - Density: 1,000/km^{2} (2,600/sq mi)
- Postal codes: 3360
- Area codes: 016

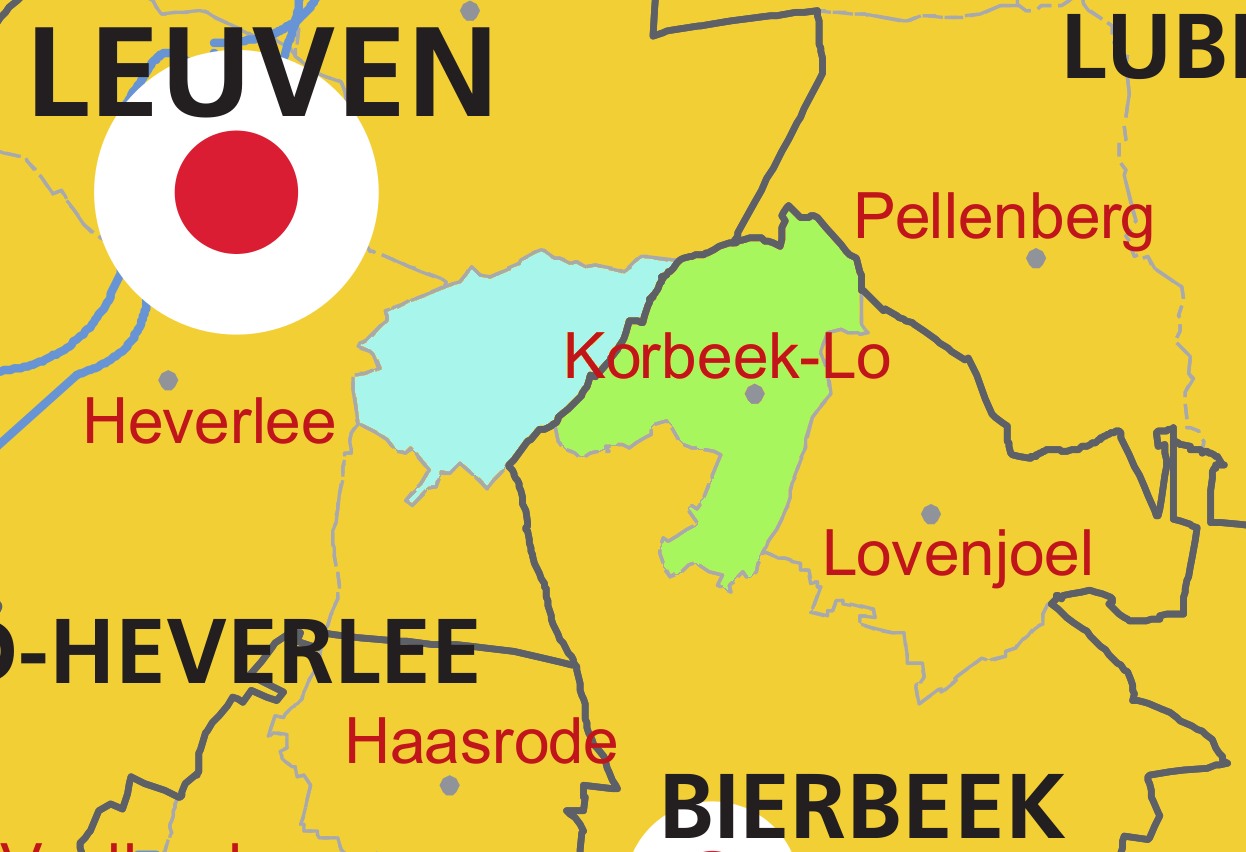
In 1977 Korbeek-Lo was abolished for administrative purposes, with the western part of the municipality subsumed into Leuven and the eastern part into the newly expanded rural municipality of Bierbeek.

Korbeek-Lo (Dutch pronunciation: [ˈkɔrbeːkˌloː]) is a sub-municipality of the municipality of Bierbeek located in the province of Flemish Brabant, Flemish Region, Belgium.

As a result of extensive local government boundary changes in 1977 Korbeek-Lo, as a municipality, was abolished. Since then the more built up western part of Korbeek-Lo has been subsumed into Leuven while the more rural eastern part of the former municipality is now part of Bierbeek.

== History ==
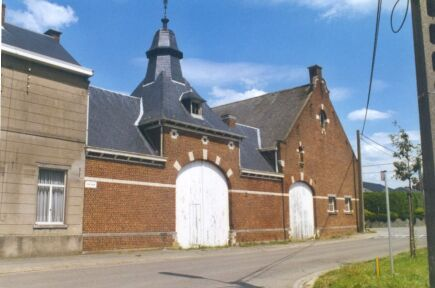
Hoeve Trappeniers, one of several traditional farmsteads in Korbeek-Lo. The rural character of the village is currently under threat.

The history of Korbeek-Lo starts a long way back. On the St.-Martinusberg plateau traces have been found of prehistoric homesteads. There is also evidence of Roman settlement, and there is evidence of human habitation during the subsequent Frankish period. One of the surviving farmsteads bears the name "Het Dalemhof", of which the middle syllable is thought to derive from the Germanic word "heim", endorsing the view that the name is of Frankish provenance.

There is little consensus on the origins of the name. One theory is that 'Korbeek' is an old term for a gentle murmuring brook, while ‘Lo’ is an old word for a copse. 'Korbeek' might simply mean ‘short brook’. 1107 finds a surviving record of the name, written as 'Corbeke’, while alternative early orthographies also include 'Cortbeke' en 'Cortebeke'. There was already a church here, in 1102, which was required to make annual payments to the abbey at Sint-Truiden.

By the late medieval period Korbeek-Lo was an agricultural village, with a handful of substantial farmsteads owned by monasteries, charitable institutions or wealthy citizens from nearby Leuven/Louvain. By the end of the fifteenth century several breweries were present, and these were popular with visitors because they were subject to lower taxation rates than breweries in Leuven.

The end of the medieval period was a time of suffering, notably at the hands of Emperor Maximillian (1488-1489) and during the Siege of Louvain by Maarten van Rossum in 1542, and again during the religious wars of the late sixteenth century, the campaigning following the creation of the Franco-Dutch alliance of 1635 and again the French invasion of 1695.

Korbeek-Lo also suffered from the European wars of the twentieth century. In 1914, 24 and 25 August saw central Louvain/Leuven set alight, and during the ensuring days it was the turn of the villages along the road towards Tienen to suffer similar assaults. Almost every house in Korbeek-Lo was plundered and 132 homes, along with 3 schools and 4 chateaux, were destroyed. 18 died.

Thirty years later, during the night of 2 September 1944, four railway trucks at the station loaded with explosives blew up, the force of the explosion damaging virtually every building in the village.

By the end of the nineteenth century the van 'De Mol' quarter also contained several small brick works, but these had all ceased to operate. Today Korbeek-Lo is a residential and commercial centre on the eastern side of Leuven.

== Transport and traffic ==
The village is bisected by the straight road connecting Leuven and Brussels to the west with Tienen, Sint-Truiden and Liège to the east. As a main road with a hard surface (known as a "Steenweg"/"stone road"), this section dates back to 1716, though its designation as the N3 (National road 3) is a twentieth century development.

Korbeek-Lo is also on the main railway line running from Brussels to Liège, this section of line, from Louvain to Tienen, having been opened in 1837. Trains no longer serve the community from here, however, since the station has been closed. The nineteenth century line has since 1993 been complemented by a High Speed Train line linking Brussels with Liège and Cologne, but at Korbeek-Lo 900 meters of the high speed track is concealed in a tunnel in order to cross other pre-existing communication routes.

A modern motorway, the A3/E40, of which the local section opened in 1972, parallels to the older National Road 3, but is positioned a couple of kilometers to the south and therefore a short distance away from the centre of the village. The nearest access point is Junction 23 (Haasrode exit), roughly 5 km / 3 miles to the south-west.
