= Sack of Lier =

Battle in the Southern Netherlands

- Part of the Eighty Years' War
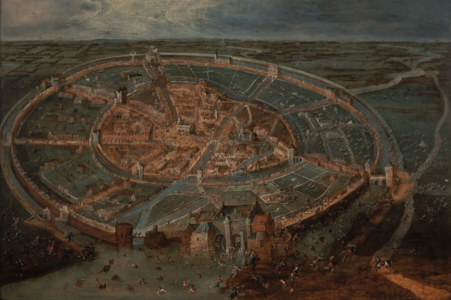
- The Relief of Lier by the troops of Antwerp and Mechelen (17th century), Flemish school.
Date	14 October 1595
Location	Lier, Duchy of Brabant, Spanish Netherlands (present-day Belgium)
Result	Spanish victory

Belligerents
Dutch Republic	(Spain) Spanish Empire

Commanders and leaders
Charles de Heraugières	Alonso de Luna; Gaspar de Mondragón; Gerard de Hornes; Antoni van Berchem; Niklaes van der Laen

Strength
870	Garrison: Unknown; Relief: 250 regulars, 3,800 militia

Casualties and losses
300–700	Unknown

The Sack of Lier, also known as the Fury of Lier in the Southern Netherlands, took place on 14 October 1595 when a force of the Dutch States Army led by Charles de Heraugières, governor of Breda, took the town by surprise during the Eighty Years' War. Heraugières, who was known for his daring surprise attacks over Breda in 1590 and Huy in March 1595, had been instructed to capture Lier ahead a small elite force while the bulk of the Spanish Army of Flanders was deployed in northern France and the Lower Rhine. The possession of Lier would have provided the Dutch Republic an advanced base deep inside the Brabant, which would allowed the States troops to cut the communications between Antwerp, Mechelen, Leuven and 's-Hertogenbosch, and to raid as far as Brussels.

Having marched from several border garrisons, the Dutch troops launched a swift attack on 14 October before dawn. A small force entered Lier across an unfinished ravelin before the Mechelen gate, neutralized the few guards of the said gate and that of Antwerp, and opened the way for the bulk of the force. The defenders, a mix of Spanish soldiers and civic guards, known as schutterij, were easily overran. Nevertheless, the governor of the town, Alonso de Luna y Cárcamo, had time enough to organize the defense at the 's-Hertogenbosch gate, also known as Lisper gate, and sent messengers to Antwerp and Mechelen calling for help. While the Dutch soldiers lost disciplane and plundered the town and desecrated its churches, the militias from Antwerp and Mechelen, reinforced by some regular troops, marched to relief Lier. After a stubborn fight, the schutterij and the Spanish troops drove the Dutch soldiers from the town and killed or captured most of them.

Although a minor action, the relief of Lier was widely celebrated in the Southern Netherlands, specially because the role of the schutterij from Antwerp and Mechelen, who revealed themselves as loyal subjects of the Spanish Crown and an effective and essential force in the defense of the Catholic south against the northern Dutch Protestants. The success was publicized through printed accounts and commemorated by means of paintings, medals and other artworks.

== Background ==
From 1579 to 1588, the Spanish Army of Flanders, led by the Prince of Parma, succeeded in bringing ten of the seventeen Dutch provinces back under the Spanish Crown. This included the town of Lier, in Brabant, which had adhered to the rebellious Union of Utrecht but was handed over to the Spanish in August 1582 by its Scottish military governor, Captain William Semple. From 1588 on, Parma was forced to distract its resources to France, which allowed the Dutch, under Maurice of Nassau, stadtholder of all the Dutch provinces save Friesland, to recover some lost ground. In 1591, he secured the IJssel river with the capture of Zutphen and Deventer, and from then on he pushed into the remaining Spanish possessions in the north. His campaigns to restore the control of the Republic over the provinces of Groningen, Drenthe, Overijssel and Gelderland culminated in July 1594 with the capture of Groningen. One year later, hoping to take advantage of the fact that Spain was at war with France, Maurice and his cousin William Louis, aiming at securing the border of the Republic with the Lower Rhenish–Westphalian Circle of the Empire by taking the last few Spanish strongholds in the north, laid siege to Groenlo ahead a force of 8,800 men. On 17 July, however, a Spanish army of 6,000 to 7,000 men under Cristóbal de Mondragón approached the town to relieve it. The Spanish troops threatened the Dutch lines of communications with the towns along the IJssel. Furthermore, Maurice's force was not large enough to guard the lines of countervallation and circumvallation at the same time, so he ordered a retreat.

Map of the vicinity of Antwerp and Mechelen with Lier and the Nete river, by Carel Allard.

Having secured Groenlo, Mondragón encamped his army near Wesel, while Maurice followed him. In the meantime, the interim governor of the Spanish Netherlands, the Count of Fuentes, besieged Cambrai, in the south, with the main Spanish Army. The command of the States Army wished to take the opportunity to make some swift gains in the mostly undefended Brabant. Intelligence collected in the previous weeks revealed that the towns of Mechelen, Aarschot and Diest were guarded just by schutterij, that the garrison of Antwerp consisted of a few Spanish infantry companies and that of Lier just of one Spanish and one Walloon foot flags. It was decided to undertake a surprise attack over Lier, whose location halfway between Antwerp and Mechelen, and not far from Herentals and Leuven, would allow the Dutch, by taking control of it, to 'put themselves in the hearth of the Catholic forces, and from there to disturb them all', as said by the Spanish soldier and writer Carlos Coloma. Besides, Lier was easy to defend, since it was surrounded by marshes which could be flooded by opening locks in the Nete and Leibeek rivers, which joined near the town, the Nete being formed by the confluence of the Grote Nete and the Kleine Nete.

A dissatisfied resident of Lier, named Mertten de Meulaer, had informed the States of Holland about the presence of a weak spot in the defenses of the town, and spies were sent to inspect the gates and find out the regular number of guards of each entrance and the hours when they were shifted. The command of the enterprise was entrusted to the governor of Breda, Charles de Heraugières, a Calvinist Walloon nobleman which had successfully undertaken daring surprise attacks over Breda in 1590 and Huy, in the Prince-Bishopric of Liège, in March 1595. The capture of Breda, in particular, had been considered a great achievement and celebrated across the Northern Netherlands in poetry, prints and songs. To avoid suspicions and preventing Spanish spies from discovering the plan, Heraugières assembled a force of 750 foot and 120 cavalry soldiers from the border garrisons of Breda, Heusden, Geertruidenberg, Bergen op Zoom and Willemstad, which were instructed to march separately the night on 13 October to the village of Sint-Job-in-'t-Goor, the southernmost of the Zandhoven canton. There, Heraugières gave them a rest and issued his orders. After that, they marched silently to Lier.

== Action ==
=== The States assault and sack ===
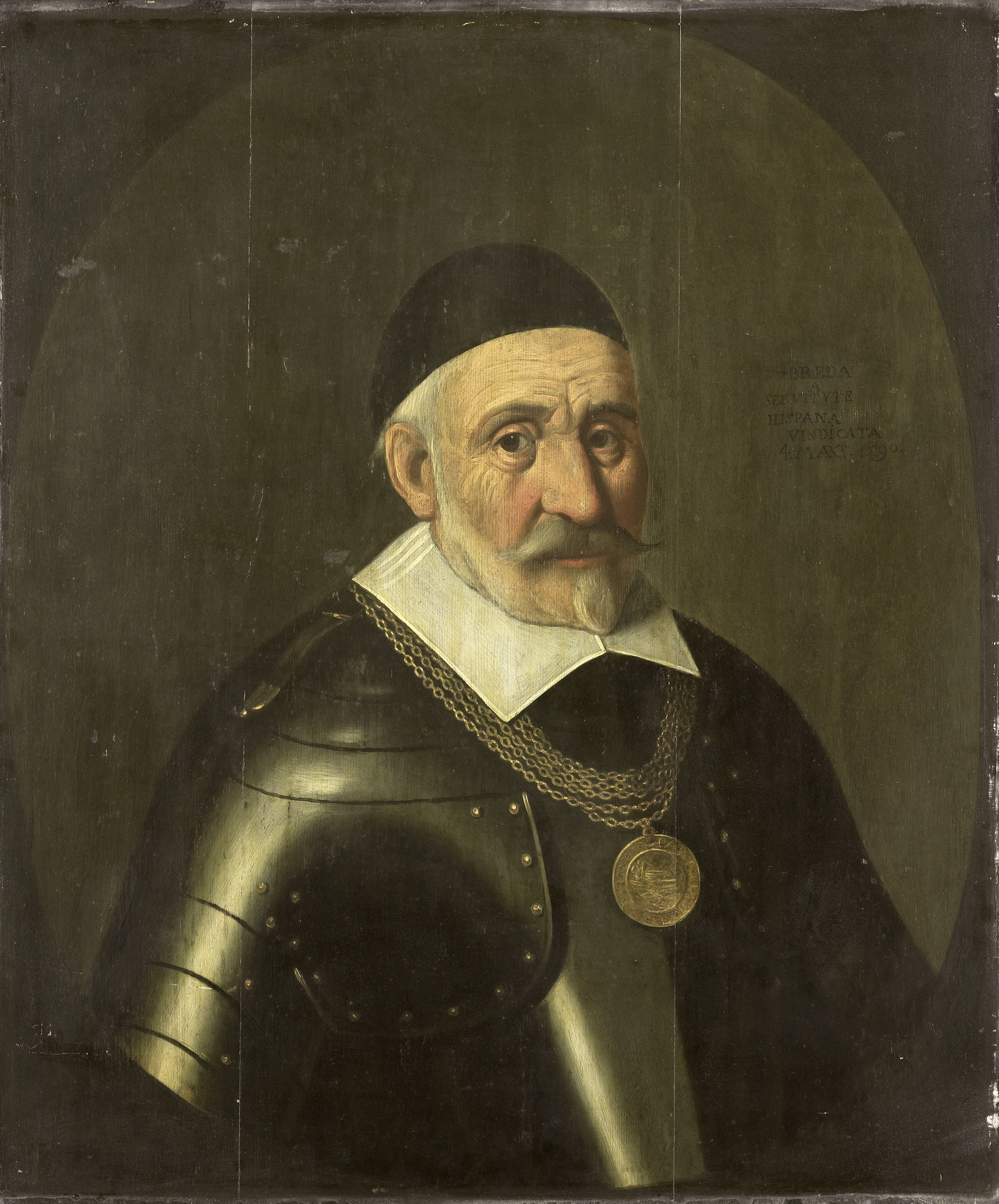
Charles de Heraugières, governor of Breda (1590), anonymous portrait.

The Dutch force arrived to the vicinity of Lier on 14 October while it still was dark, between 4 a. m. and 5 a. m. Heraugières dispatched a vanguard under Captain Van Boetselaer to ford the moat between the Antwerp and Mechelen gates, which they did waist deep in water without being discovered thanks to the darkness. An armed burgher guarding the wall heard a splash in the water, but, probably fearing to be mocked for believing in a folk tale known as The water devil, he did not inform his officer. When the clock of the town hall stuck 5 a. m. and the guard was replaced, the Dutch assailants scaled an unfinished ravelin which was being erected to protect the Mechelen gate and stabbed the new sentinel, a man called Coenraert Perre, before he could give the alarm. Then Van Boetselar and his men quickly overran the guard post next to the gate, where they killed 12 schutterij, while his lieutenant did the same in the Antwerp gate. Meanwhile, Perre, who had been left for dead, recovered consciousness and, albeit badly wounded, was able to reach the main guard post in the Markt square and gave the alarm.

While Heraugières entered Lier across the Mechelen gate with the main force, the Spanish governor, Captain Alonso de Luna y Cárcamo, send messengers to Antwerp and Mechelen and quickly mobilized all the men available, both soldiers and militia. He send a part of them to join the schutterij in the Markt square to contain the Dutch while himself, with the remaining force, build up a barricade with carts, barrels and mattresses in the Antwerp street to block the advance of the attackers. The States soldiers pushed the defenders to the Markt, killing 40 Spanish soldiers and three schutterij in the process. Following Luna's instructions, however, the garrison had time enough to secure and close the 's-Hertogenbosch gate, flanked by two round towers easy to defend, as well as a neighboring Carthusian monastery. Besides this, the lock in the Nete river, in the northern side of the wall, was closed to prevent the Dutch from entering the town from there. The battle in the Markt, nevertheless, had been decided in favour of the attackers. Several buildings in the square, and also in the Antwerp and Mechelen streets, were on fire. The schutterij tried to entrench themselves in the town hall, but they were ultimately overrun.

Captain Luna withdrew his men along the Den Bosch, Rauwbroek and Brouwery streets to the 's-Hertogenbosch gate, where he was able to regroup his force and stop the Dutch push. Heraugières ordered the gate and Carthusian monastery to be carried by assault. His men, however, were met by a heavy musketry fire and fell back. Captain Arnold van Buren led a section of Dutch soldiers across the walls to attack the gate from outside, but he was killed by a musket shot and his soldiers retreated to safer positions to harass the Spanish from behind. The attack over the Monastery succeeded, but then the Dutch soldiers lost discipline as they found many wine barrels in the monastery's cellar and got drunk. Heraugières was unable to restore order, and the States troops spread out around the town in search of booty. The Calvinist soldiery looted the Lier town hall and many of the town's churches and private houses. The religious images were destroyed or damaged, and the church ornaments were taken as booty. Some soldiers dressed themselves in priestly garments and mocked the Catholic liturgy in other ways. Heraugières had to content himself to ensure that all the gates were closed and the Spanish defenders remained under harassment. To do this, three cannons were taken from the city walls to fire upon the entrenched positions, although the Spanish had also one piece, as Luna had ordered sergeant Diego Mateo to carry one falconet, two barrels of powder and a number of cannonballs to the 's-Hertogenbosch gate.

=== Spanish relief ===
Soon after the Dutch assault had begun, the Italian military engineer Francesco Angeli, right-hand man to Alonso de Luna, was dispatched on horseback to Antwerp across the 's-Hertogenbosch gate. He arrived to the city early in the morning and informed the burgomaster and Captain Gaspar de Mondragón –nephew of Cristóbal de Mondragón and interim governor of the citadel of Antwerp during the absence of the latter– about the attack. A force was quickly assembled to march in relief of Lier. Mondragón took 250 Spanish soldiers from the garrison of the citadel and assumed the overall command, though the bulk of the force was formed by 16schutterij companies ley by the schepens Antoni van Berchem, Jacob d'Assa and Gillis de Mera, and jonkheer Anselm van den Cryuce, administrador of the city. They were, in all, about 3,000 men. The 80 schutterij of Borgerhout led the way in command of jonkheer Josse Robyns, schout of Burgerhout. Meanwhile, another messenger arrived to Mechelen by 8 a. m. having crossed the Nete at the Anderstad castle. The governor of the city, Gerard de Hornes, baron of Bassignies, was just in command of a Walloon infantry company, but he was joined by 800 schutterij under Niklaes van der Laen, burgomaster of Mechelen, his brother Jan, Lord of Schriek en te Grootloo, and ridders Jan van Wachtendonck, Ladislaus van Gottignies, Karel van Boevekerke and Jacob van Cranendonck.

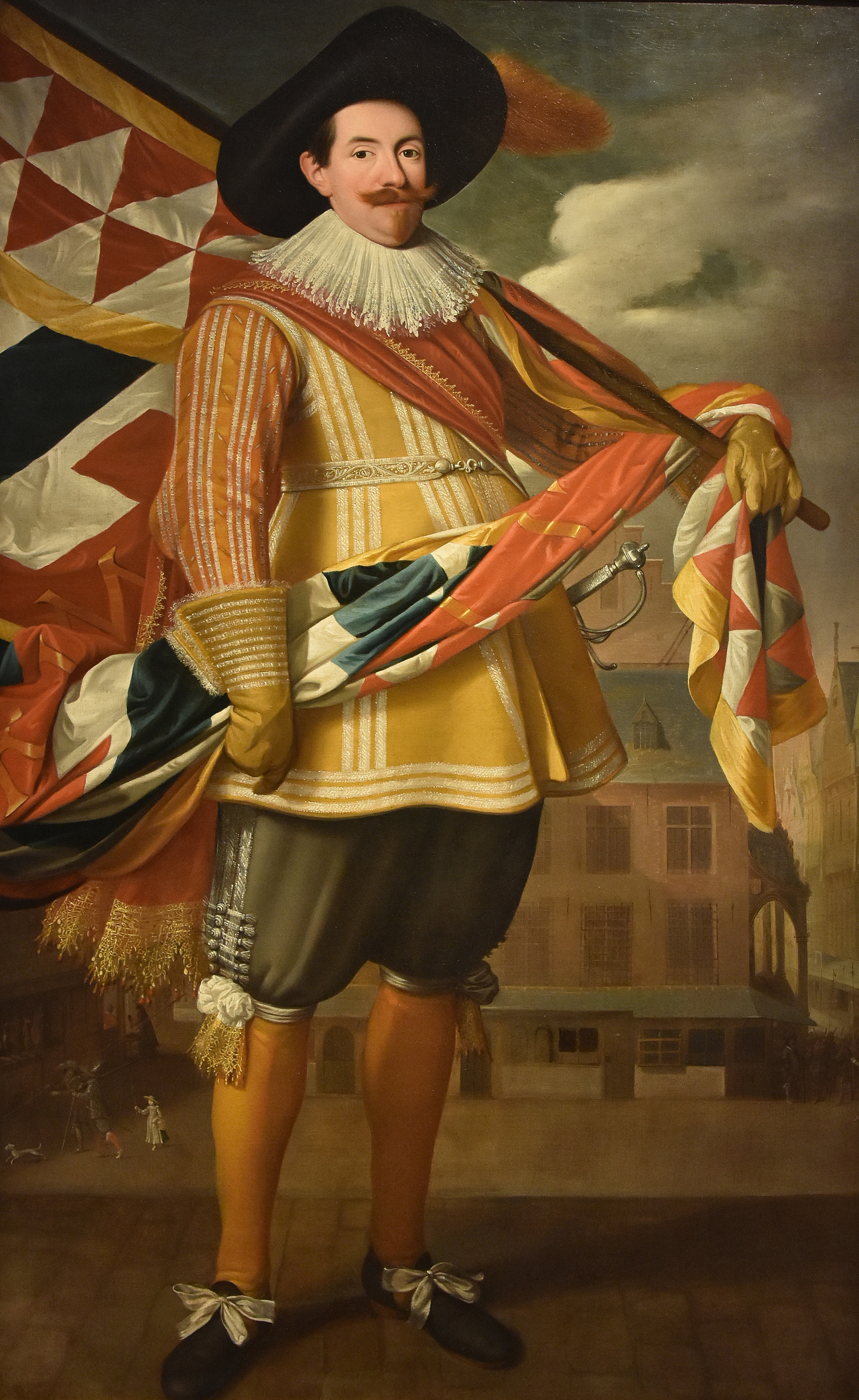
Rombout Heyns, flag bearer of the Mechelen gunners' guild in the 1580s, by Jan Verhoeven.

The relief force from Melechen marched directly to the Anderstad castle, from the towers of which they saw the royal flag over the 's-Hertogenbosch gate of Lier. Burgmaster Van der Laen ordered his second in command, a retired German soldier called Sebastiaen Cuyser, to build a pontoon bridge to allow the entire force to cross the Nete, which he did by taking two large boats from the nearby village of Duffel. Having left a sizeable garrison at Anderstad, the bulk of the force advanced to the village of Donk and linked with the Antwerp force under Mondragón. Then they marched unopposed to Lier and were warmly received by Alonso de Luna and his men, who opened the 's-Hertogenbosch gate to let them in. The Spanish and Walloon soldiers and the Flemish militia then launched a two-pronged attack over the States troops. A first, main column drove the Dutch from the inner 's-Hertogenbosch gate and pushed them to the Markt district while a second, auxiliary column rushed along the Rauwbroek y Kerk streets. No prisoners were taken during the street fight.

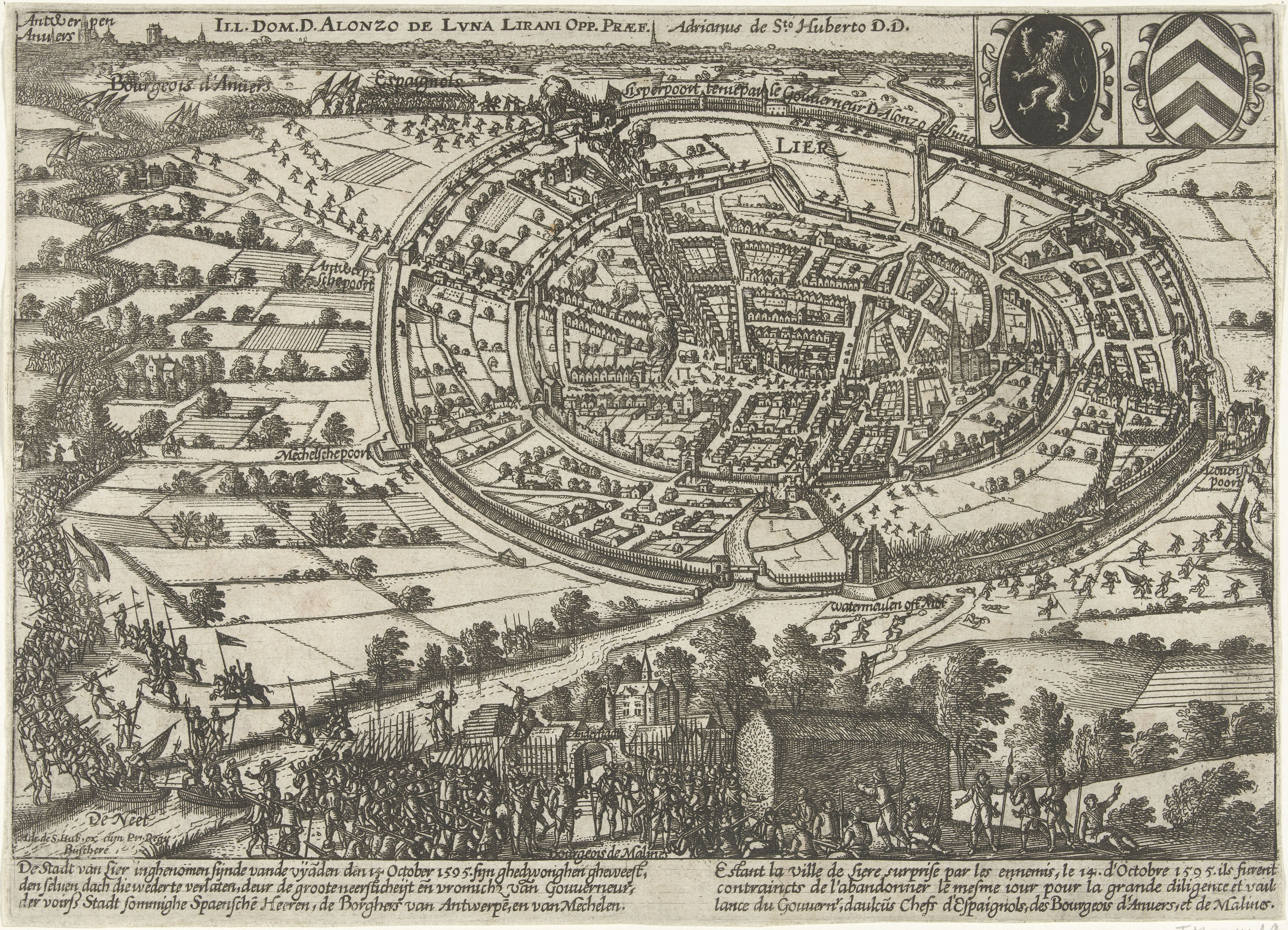
Lier captured and abandoned by the Dutch army, anonymous print.

The Dutch force was unable to mount a strong defense. The troops were either tired from the previous fighting or drunk, and many of them argued that it was better to escape with the booty than trying to hold the town. Heraugières organized the defense of the Markt square with his best soldiers, but they were soon pushed out of it and fell back to the fish market, located in an island between two bridges over the Kleine Nete. Heraugières left there a rearguard under Captain Van Boetselaer to cover the retreat. However, the Dutch officer was slain, and his men fled disorderly towards the Leuven gate. The Dutch soldiers found their way blocked by a Catholic force under Van den Cruyce and d'Assa, who advanced along the outer wall and retook the Antwerp and Mechelen gates while other troops cleared the Carthusian monastery from an isolated pocket of Dutch soldiers. The Flemish schutterij seized the Leuven gate, flanked by three towers and provided with loopholes from where they opened fire on the approaching Dutch troops. On finding the Leuven gate closed, Heraugières' men panicked and lost cohesion. They fled across the Pettendonk, chased by the Catholic soldiers and militia, hoping to escape across the Mol watergate. The States troops, either on foot or in horseback, jumped into the Nete to save themselves. Heraugières was able to escape back to Breda followed by several officers and most of the cavalry, though losing their mounts in the process. Many Dutch soldiers drowned, and others were captured.

The total loss of the Dutch force had been variely assessed. The Spanish officer and writer Carlos Coloma stated that 640 Dutch dead were counted on the streets of Lier and 60 prisoners were taken, and that it was later known that just 80 men returned to Breda with Heraugières. The Dutch historian and merchant Emanuel van Meteren, on the other hand, reduced the number of casualties to 300, although adding that 'this loss was even greater because they were mostly veteran soldiers'. Modern estimations set the Dutch losses at 500 men dead. They were buried in two mass graves near the Mol watergate. Among the casualties there were several officers. Two majors died: Van Boetselaer and Van den Broek, as well as captains Van Buren and Van Dorp, lieutenants Voet and Geyzelaers, ensign Greun, and Willem de Vos, adjudant of Heraugières, who had gained renown during the capture of Huy that March.

== Aftermath ==
News about the Catholic victory were quickly sent to Antwerp and Brussels. As Heraugières had previously reported the capture of Lier, the Dutch garrisons of Lillo and other Dutch forts in the vicinity of Antwerp fired several salvos to celebrate the taking of the town. However, they were soon silenced by three salvos from the 150 cannons of the citadel and the city walls of Antwerp. Next day, once the ravelin of the Mechelen gate had been repaired, the schutterij returned to their cities, where crowds of citizens rushed to welcome them. The many bags and packages full of looted objects which the Dutch soldiers abandoned in the streets of Lier during their flight were ordered to be carried to the residence of Melchior van Cortbeemde, burgomaster of Lier, for the residents to claim back their stolen properties. However, few people followed the mandate, choosing instead to keep what they were able to seize during the confusion.

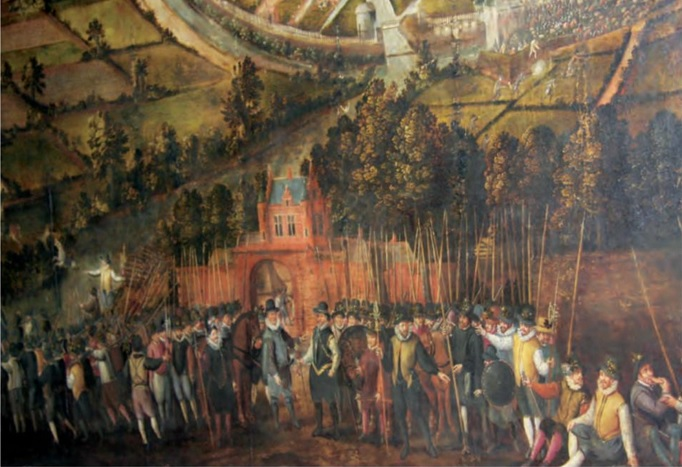
Schutterij from Mechelen at the Anderstad Castle during the relief of Lier, detail from a painting by Jan II Ghuens.

Further south, the Count of Fuentes, who remained with the main army around Cambrai, having captured the city a few weeks before, was already in knowledge about the Dutch enterprise and had dispatched a force of 4,000 foot and 500 horse to relief Lier or, in case that it had fallen, to invest it until he arrived with a larger force. They stopped their march between Mons and Valenciennes when informed about the Dutch defeat. News about the coup had also reached a number of soldiers who had mutinied and seized the town of Tienen as their base. Albeit rebellious to the army's command, they had sent 1,000 men to relief Lier, who knew about the victory on their way to the town and returned to Tienen. According to Coloma, Fuentes joyfully received the news of the relief, as 'it perfectioned all the other events of that year'. The string of defeats of the Army of Flanders following the loss of Breda in 1590 was stemmed in 1595 with the conquest of Cambrai and the victory over the French army at the Battle of Doullens, in the south, and the relief of Groenlo and the defeat of the States cavalry near Wesel, in the north. The loyal provinces then asked Fuentes to besiege Ostend, the last Dutch stronghold in the south, to put the raids by its garrison to an end. However, he declined, since he know that Philip II had appointed the Archduke Albert of Austria as governor and he wished to leave the Netherlands with his reputation intact.

The relief of Lier was widely reported on its immediate aftermath as far as in Italy, where Bernardino Beccari in Rome and Pietro Diserolo in Verona printed accounts of the events. Anthonis de Ballo and Rutger Velpius published accounts in Antwerp and Brussels, respectively. The first one recounted the events from the perspective of the Antwerp militia, while the second one was based in a notarised copy of the verbal report to the Privy Council of Gillis Rombouts, lieutenant of the Mechelen schutterij. A third account was printed in Lille by Antoine Tack, while Adriaen Huybrechts brought out an engraving of the relief with authorisation from Joachim de Buschere, secretary of the Council of Brabant. All the accounts emphasized the key role of the schutterij, which, asides from large-scale actions such as the relief of Lier, were regularly involved in small-scale actions against the Dutch vrijbuters, the French cavalry, the mutineers of the Royal Army and bandits of all sorts. Additionally, the contribution of the Antwerp and Mechelen militias to the relief of Lier evidenced the compromise between the Southern Netherlandish population and the Spanish Crown to fight together against the Dutch Protestants.

== Legacy ==
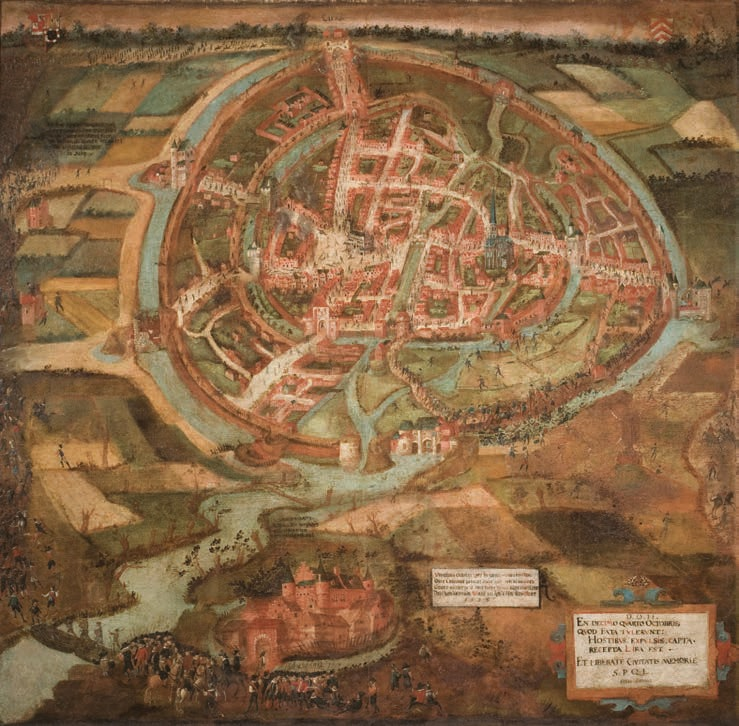
The Fury of Lier in 1595, anonymous oil on canvas in the Museum Wuyts-Van Campen, formerly in the town hall of Lier.

The relief of Lier was commemorated in the Southern Netherlands through silver-gilt basins, medals and three paintings. In 1596, the Mechelen town council commissioned the local artist Jan Ghuens II to paint a canvas showing the relief of Lier, for which he was paid 42 florins. The senior officers of the town's civic guard feature prominently in the foreground. This painting became a matter of urban pride and memory, and helped to seal the wounds of the two sacks of Mechelen, by the Spanish in 1572 and by the States troops in 1580. The origins of the two other paintings are unclear. One of them was already at the Lier town hall in 1740, which suggests that it was commissioned by the municipal authorities. Though similar the Ghuens' canvas and also featuring the Mechelen schutterij, it devots a higher detail to the urban landscape, and it is known as Liersche Kaart ('map of Lier'). The third painting is similar to the other two, but it provides more details about the fight, as both the Dutch assault and the Catholic relief are shown. The three paintings are likely inspired by Huybrechts' engraving about the events, as well as by the views of Lier in the Civitates Orbis Terrarum (1572-1617) by Georg Braun and Frans Hogenberg, and in the Descrittione (1581) by Lodovico Guicciardini.

In Lier, the windows of the church in Carthusian monastery were adorned, some time after the events, with stained glasses that visually recounted the sack and the relief. After the Carthusians were banned from the Habsburg Netherlands in 1783 following a secularization decree issued by Emperor Joseph II, the monastery was demolished and the stained glasses were sold at a low price to different individuals. Medals were produced at Antwerp and Mechelen to be individually awarded to the principal participants in the relief. The Antwerp city hall commissioned the medallist and sculptor Jacques Jonghelinck to craft a number of medals adorned with a woman crowned by the citadel of Antwerp in the obverse, and a descriptive caption on the reverse, for which he was paid 534 florins and 15 sous. Moreover, the town council gave schepens Antoni van Berchem, Jacob d'Assa and Gillis de Mera, as well as Captain Gaspar de Mondragón, silver-gilt basins valued, together, at 829 florins and 2 sous.

A religious feast was established in 1596 to celebrate the salvation of the town each year on 14 October. It consisted of a procession known as the 'Furie van Lier' which marched from the Collegiate Church of Sint-Gummarus to the 's-Hertogenbosch gate, where the relics of Gummarus, contained in a silver reliquary, were deposited, the Blessed Sacrament was elevated over an altar, and a Te Deum and a Latin hymn were sung. By the second half of the 19th century, the original meaning of the feast had been lost, since most of the inhabitants of Lier believed then that the procession was held to thank Gummarus for having saved the town not from the Dutch Calvinists, but from the pagan Normans.
