= Korbeek-Lo, Leuven =

Suburb of the city of Leuven, Belgium

Korbeek-Lo
- Part of Leuven
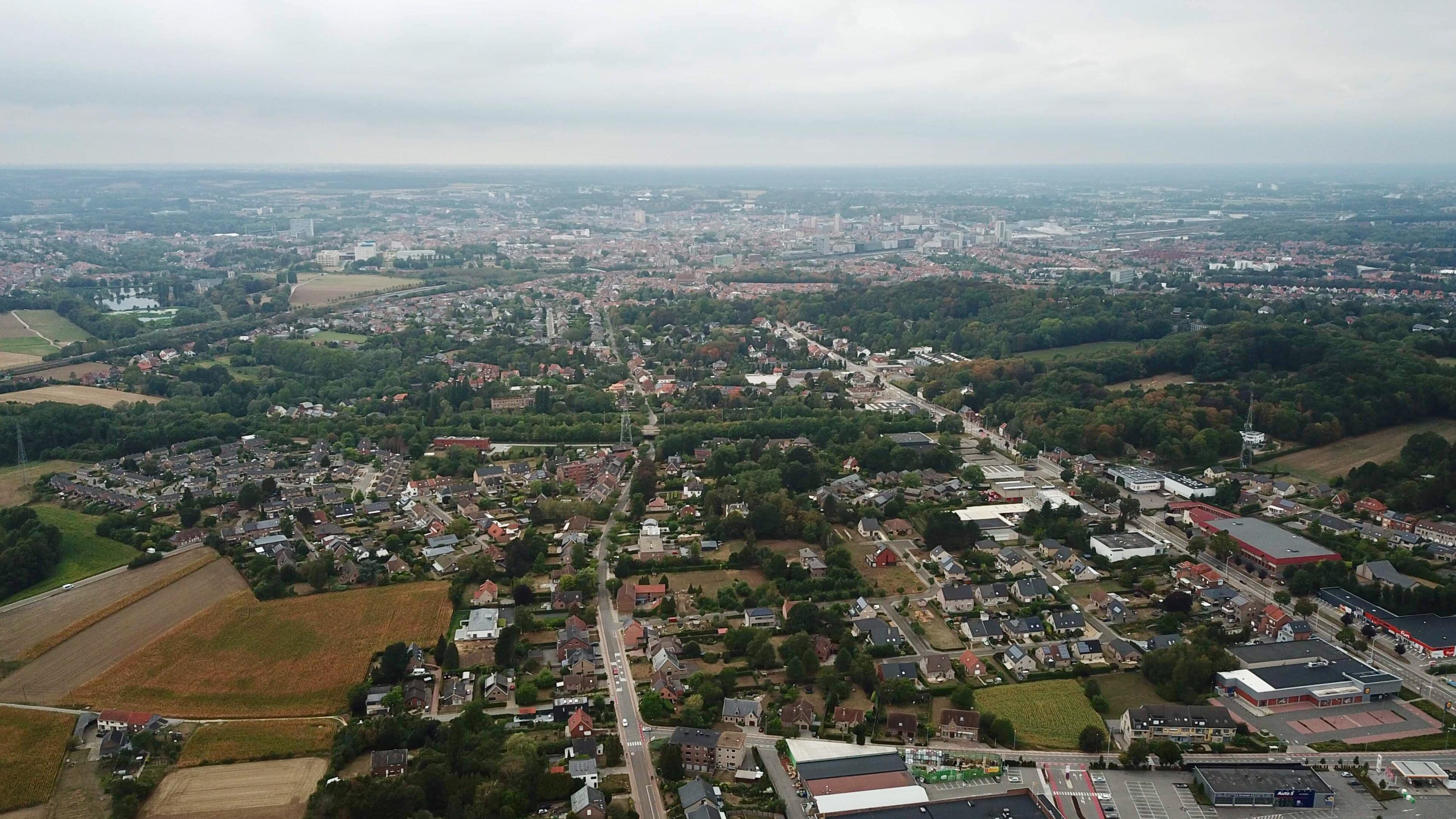
- Aerial view of Korbeek-Lo, Leuven
- Interactive map of Korbeek-Lo
- Location within Belgium Location within Flemish Brabant
- Coordinates: 50°52′00″N 4°44′00″E
- Country: Belgium
- Community: Flemish Community
- Region: Flemish Region
- Province: Flemish Brabant
- Arrondissement: Leuven
- Municipality: Leuven

Area
  - Total: 2.2 km^{2} (0.85 sq mi)

Population (2012-01-01)
  - Total: 3,010
  - Density: 1,400/km^{2} (3,500/sq mi)
- Postal codes: 3000
- Area codes: 016

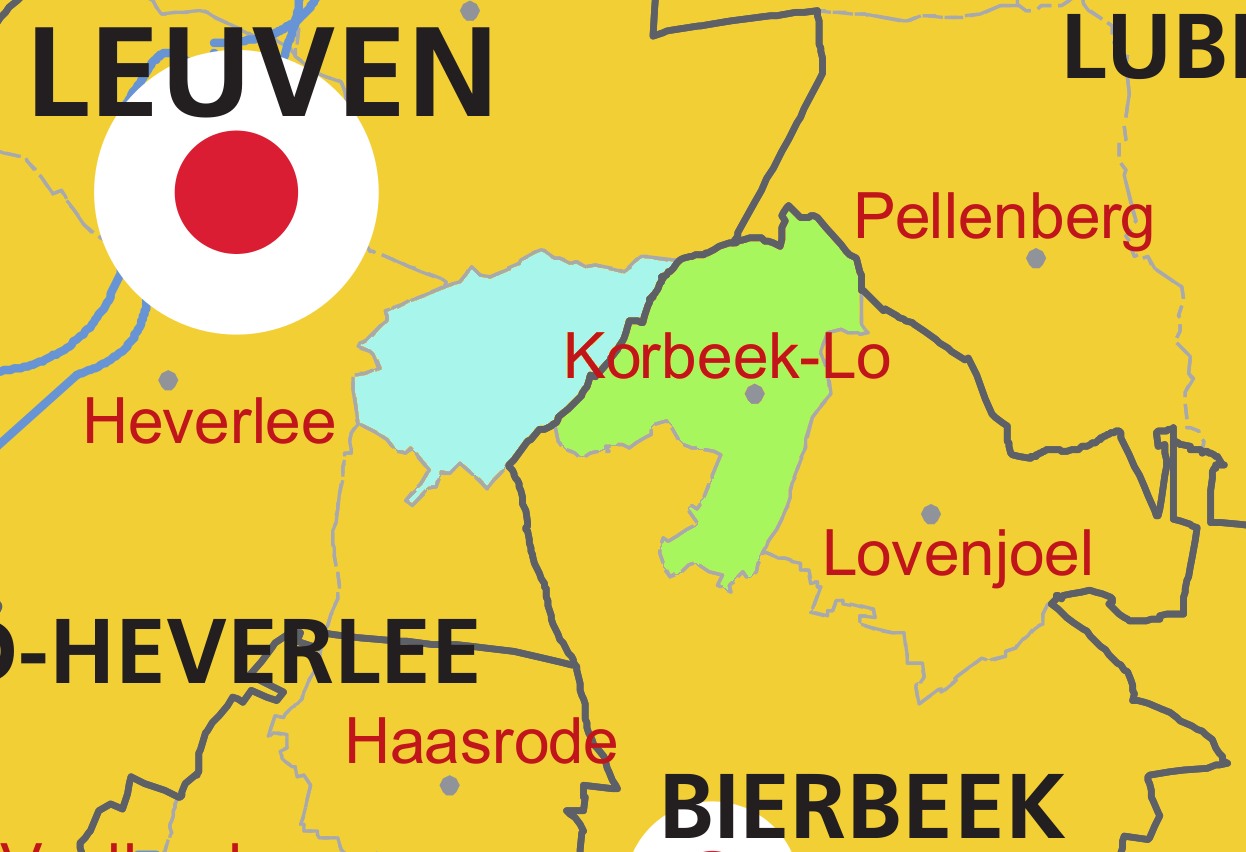
In 1977 Korbeek-Lo was abolished for administrative purposes, with the western part of the municipality subsumed into Leuven and the eastern part into the newly expanded rural municipality of Bierbeek.

The western part of the former municipality of Korbeek-Lo (Dutch pronunciation: [ˈkɔrbeːkˌloː]) is now a part of the city of Leuven, Belgium. According to the official website of Leuven, Korbeek-Lo is a part of the sub-municipality of Leuven.

As a result of extensive local government boundary changes in 1977 Korbeek-Lo, as a municipality, was abolished. Since then the more built up western part of Korbeek-Lo has been subsumed into Leuven while the more rural eastern part of the former municipality is now part of Bierbeek.
