= Battle of Lillo =

1574 sea battle near Fort Lillo

- Part of the Eighty Years' War
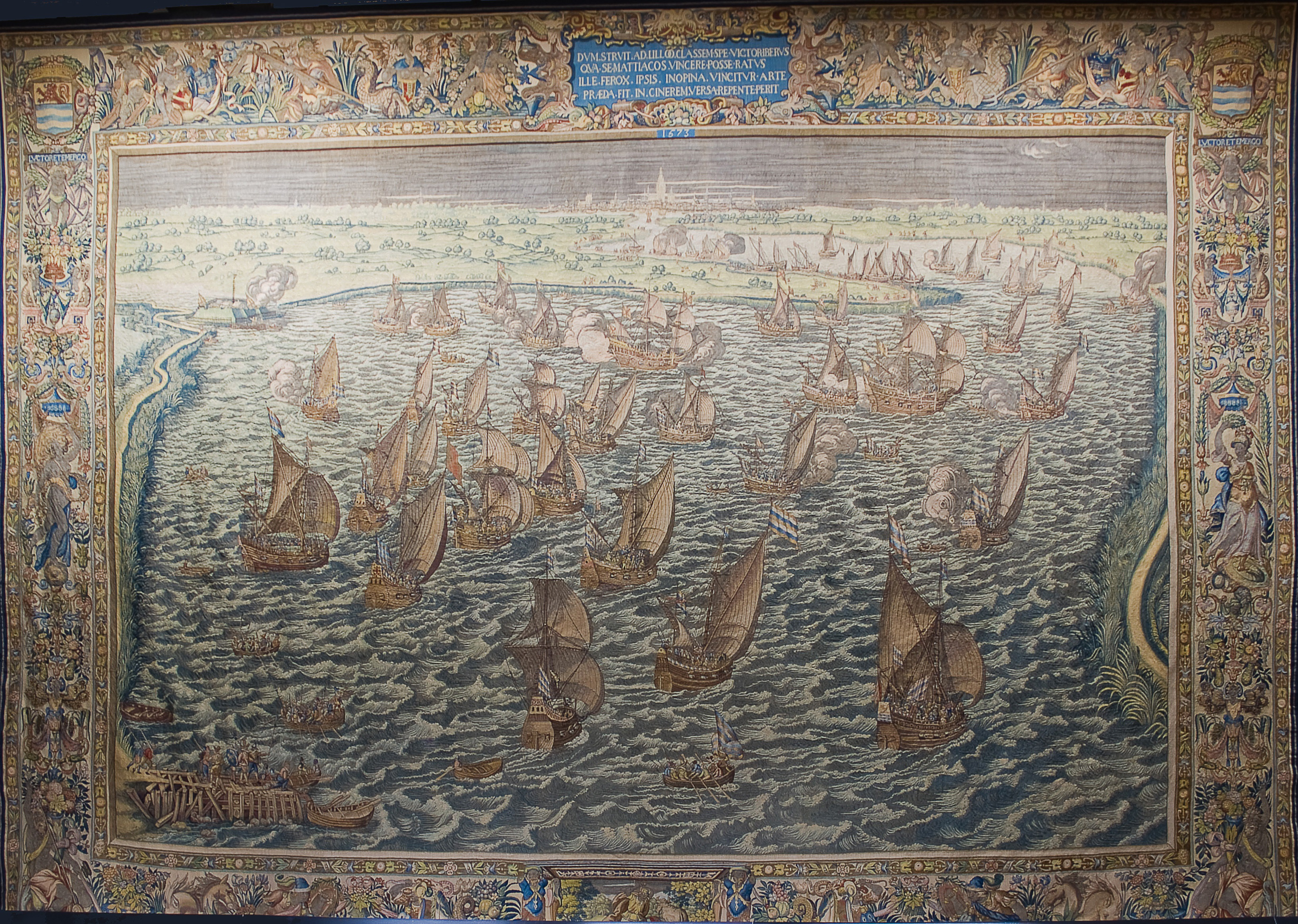
- Battle of Lillo, tapestry by Jan de Maecht (1597/98) at the Zeeuws Museum
Date	30 May 1574
Location	near Antwerp, Spanish Netherlands
Result	Dutch victory

Belligerents
Dutch rebels	Spain

Commanders and leaders
Lodewijk van Boisot	(Spanish Empire) Juan Adolf van Haamstede

Strength
64 ships	Unknown

Casualties and losses
No ships lost	10 ships captured

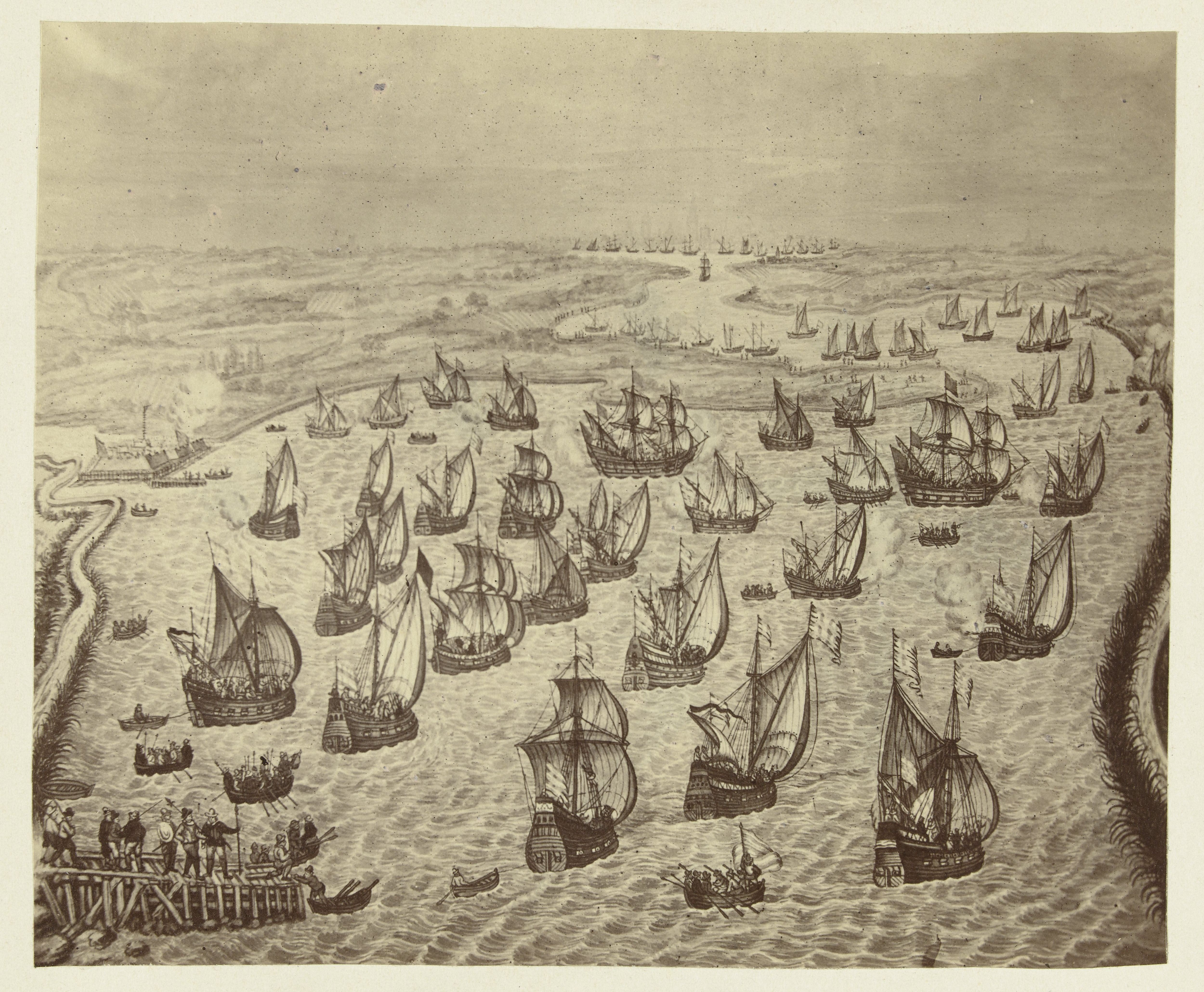
Battle of Lillo

The Battle of Lillo was a naval battle that took place during the Eighty Years' War. A Dutch fleet under the command of Lodewijk van Boisot defeated a Spanish fleet at anchor between the fortresses of Lillo and Liefkenshoek near Antwerp. The Spanish lost ten ships which were captured by the Dutch.
