= English political intrigue during the Dutch Revolt =

English political intrigue, and further involvement in the Dutch Revolt by the Kingdom of England under Queen Elizabeth I, supported the Republic of the Seven United Netherlands in achieving its independence during the Dutch Revolt (1585–1648), in resistance to Habsburg Spain under Philip II. This development led to a more actively interventionist foreign policy for England, going forward in its history.

In addition to concerns about expanded Spanish power in the Netherlands, which was supposed to threaten England itself, French intrigue in the region under the Duke of Anjou also mattered, It became a consideration for Elizabeth's government in addressing its policy towards the Netherlands.

Prominent officials, including Robert Dudley, the Earl of Leicester, and Francis Walsingham, as well as the Queen herself, discussed the situation openly. They took it that the future of the Netherlands was pertinent to English sovereignty. Internal disagreements between the Earl of Leicester and the Queen on the best approach became a controversy on whether direct involvement was necessary, or monetary support and sanctuary to Dutch rebels was better.

== English political concerns around the Netherlands ==
=== Concerns with the Spanish and Spanish Allies ===
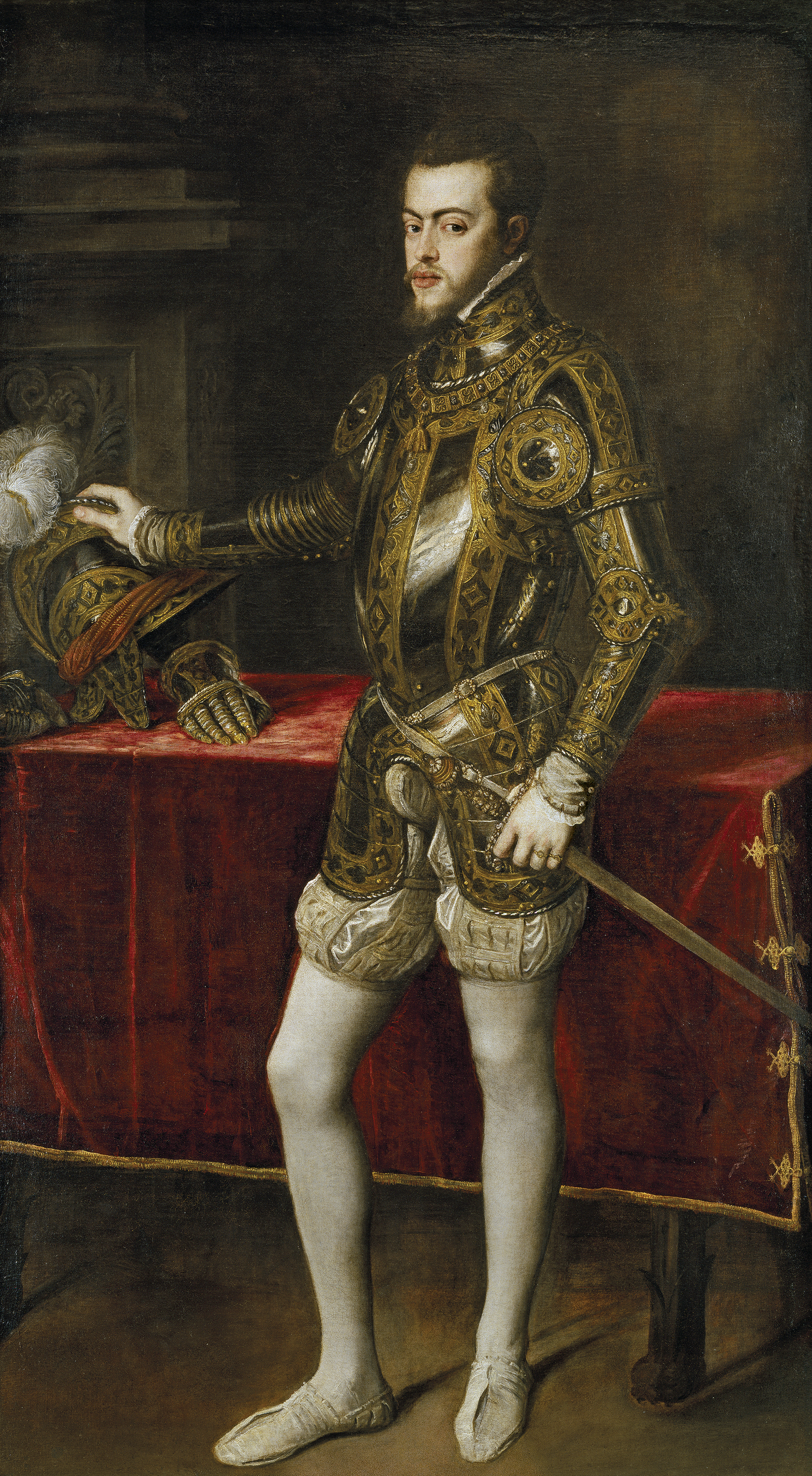
Philip II, the King of Spain, as well as Elizabeth's contemporary during her reign

The primary external concern came from worries around the potential actions of Spain. Initial discussion on the necessity of English involvement within the then-ongoing Dutch Revolt was elevated through fear on the part of the Queen's Privy Council to the possibility of the Netherlands to be used by Spain as a staging ground for an invasion into England as a means to depose Elizabeth and reinstate the Catholic Church. Questions were raised among the advisors to the degree of the Spanish King's religious resolve to Catholicism, and as a result, the potential alignment to the wishes of Pope Pius V after Elizabeth's excommunication and the subsequent loss of her legitimacy in the Regnans in Excelsis in 1570. The papal bull, which split Catholics that were within England between devotion to their country and monarch, and to their church within their own community, created uncertainty also to Elizabeth's government in how to predict Phillip's progress. According to historian Wallace T. MacCaffrey:

What frightened and baffled even the most cool-headed English councillors in assessing the probable course of Spanish policy was the unpredictable ideological component in Phillip’s views. Would he be content with the restoration of his power and the re-establishment of his faith in his Burgundian provinces, or would the compulsions of religious ideology drive him beyond these traditional aims to the grander tasks of exterminating heresy in general, and, in particular, in the British Isles?

Outside of England, and despite a deep common hatred of Spain within England, English Catholic émigrés that fled to the Netherlands as a result of Elizabeth's government, put faith into Phillip to be the catalyst of a return to Catholicism, most strongly so with the de-legitimization of Elizabeth's cousin and next heir at the time, Mary, Queen of Scots.

=== Governors of the Spanish Netherlands ===
Fernando Álvarez de Toledo, the 3rd Duke of Alba, became as governor a symbol for oppression among the Protestant Dutch, having this exemplified in the popular imagination among that population by the executions of Lamoral, Count of Egmont and Philip de Montmorency, Count of Horn.

Don John of Austria, a half-brother of Phillip II, was viewed as having been appointed governor by Phillip in light of his own ambition, having himself “dreamed of a throne of his own.” Don John was also considered by English Catholic émigrés “as early as 1572” to be a good suitor to Mary, Queen of Scots, legitimizing a claim to the English throne. This unofficial candidacy was definitely a cause for concern among the Privy Council under Elizabeth.

=== House of Croye ===
From within the Netherlands, the House of Croye rooted itself as the prominent Catholic family, contrasting to the Protestant House of Orange. Led by the brothers Charles Philippe de Croÿ, Marquis d’Havré and Philippe III de Croÿ, the House supported Spanish intervention within the Low Countries in the interest of working against French influence. In the interests of leadership, they favored a relative of Phillip's, the Archduke Matthias of Austria as the Dutch governor, which he became in January 1578 as Governor-General of Brussels. However, the leader of their rivals in the House of Orange, William the Silent, became the Lieutenant-General underneath Matthias as a result in seeking out a joint Catholic-Protestant solution.

The House also took a particular stance on English assistance, leading other Catholic noble families in accepting English monetary assistance, but not English manpower, especially expeditions led by the Earl of Leicester, who was friendly with the House of Orange. They succeeded to have the Council of State bar the acceptance of English men in late 1577, yet held onto a promise made by Elizabeth of £100,000 to be spent in the conflict. This resolve was later reversed by the States, however, and manned English assistance was allowed on November 19 of that year.

=== Assassination of William the Silent, the Prince of Orange ===
(see also: William the Silent: Assassination)

The assassination of William of Orange in 1584 by a Catholic supporter of Philip II acting upon an edict by the latter to have William killed, led to an emboldening of Protestant fervor against the Spanish government despite the action seeming to decapitate the initial resistance movement. Elizabeth responded to the assassination of the Prince of Orange with strengthening her policies assisting in the revolt.

== Possibility of French influence ==
Even though the Kingdom of France itself was not of an immediate threat or direct concern to the Elizabethan government as Spain was seen to be, its potential ability to utilize the Netherlands against the interests of England caused Elizabeth's government to also consider France in its exterior assessments. France at this time had a similar level of religious conflict in its own borders, between the Catholic establishment of the French Crown and the Protestant Huguenots. Yet despite this, concern existed on the proximity and subsequent power of France:

For Englishmen the specter of French domination of the Low Countries was a frightening one. It would give that kingdom a throttle-hold on England’s main trading partner and secure to her the great financial and industrial resources of these rich provinces. And strategically England would be flanked at every angle from Biscay to the Ems by the single power of France. This last consideration weighed heavily in all English decisions about their neighbors’ affairs. There could be no neutrality towards the troubles of the seventeen provinces nor towards those of France so long as the probability of French intervention in the former remained.

=== The Duke of Anjou ===
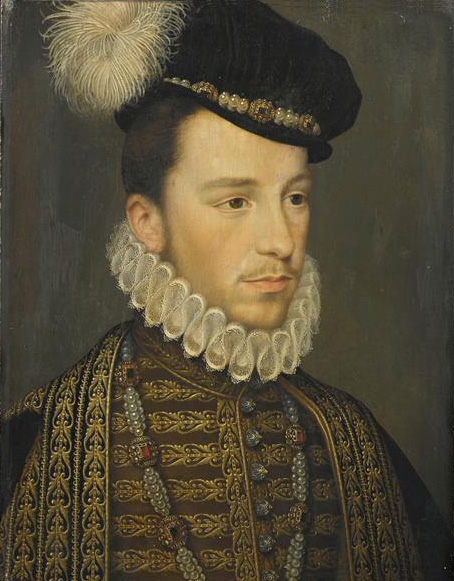
Francis, the Duke of Anjou

Interest in the Duke of Anjou to English interests began at the end of April in 1578, when commissioners representing the States were negotiating with representatives of the Duke, where the States wished for the Duke to involve himself in the conflict by invading other Habsburg-held territories that were not part of the Revolt, such as Burgundy. Although these discussions yielded no result in practice, it led to reaction by Elizabeth in turn. When these dealings were brought to the Queen's attentions, William Davison was given orders by Elizabeth to approach the States and amend the terms of the monetary assistance that England would give through Prince Casimir of the Palatinate, who was receiving funding from England in increments of £20,000 for soldiers to help the States, requiring now that it would be on the condition that the States can no longer deal with the Duke if a second £20,000 were to be sent. By late May, the Duke attempts to engage in a treaty with the States to commit “for two months with 10,000 foot soldiers and 2,000 horsemen under his own direct control.” This made Elizabeth furious with the States, ordering Davison to freeze English assets to the States and order Casimir to stay idle until dealings with the Duke are completely ceased and when representatives Walsingham and Cobham will arrive.

At the same time, in the spring of 1578, a series of Protestant insurrections arose in the southern, Spanish-controlled Netherlands, which led to them having “seized churches for their use, expelled the religious orders, smashed altars and images, and demanded the right to public observance and promulgation of their faith.” From these insurrections, the fear of a Spanish advantage from the Dutch disunity as a result of the mass protests caused Elizabeth to promptly reconsider her stance on the Duke, allowing “clandestine agents” to establish a direct line, as well as giving freedom to the States to deal with the Duke.

== Sympathies of leaders and other prominent people ==
=== Queen Elizabeth I ===
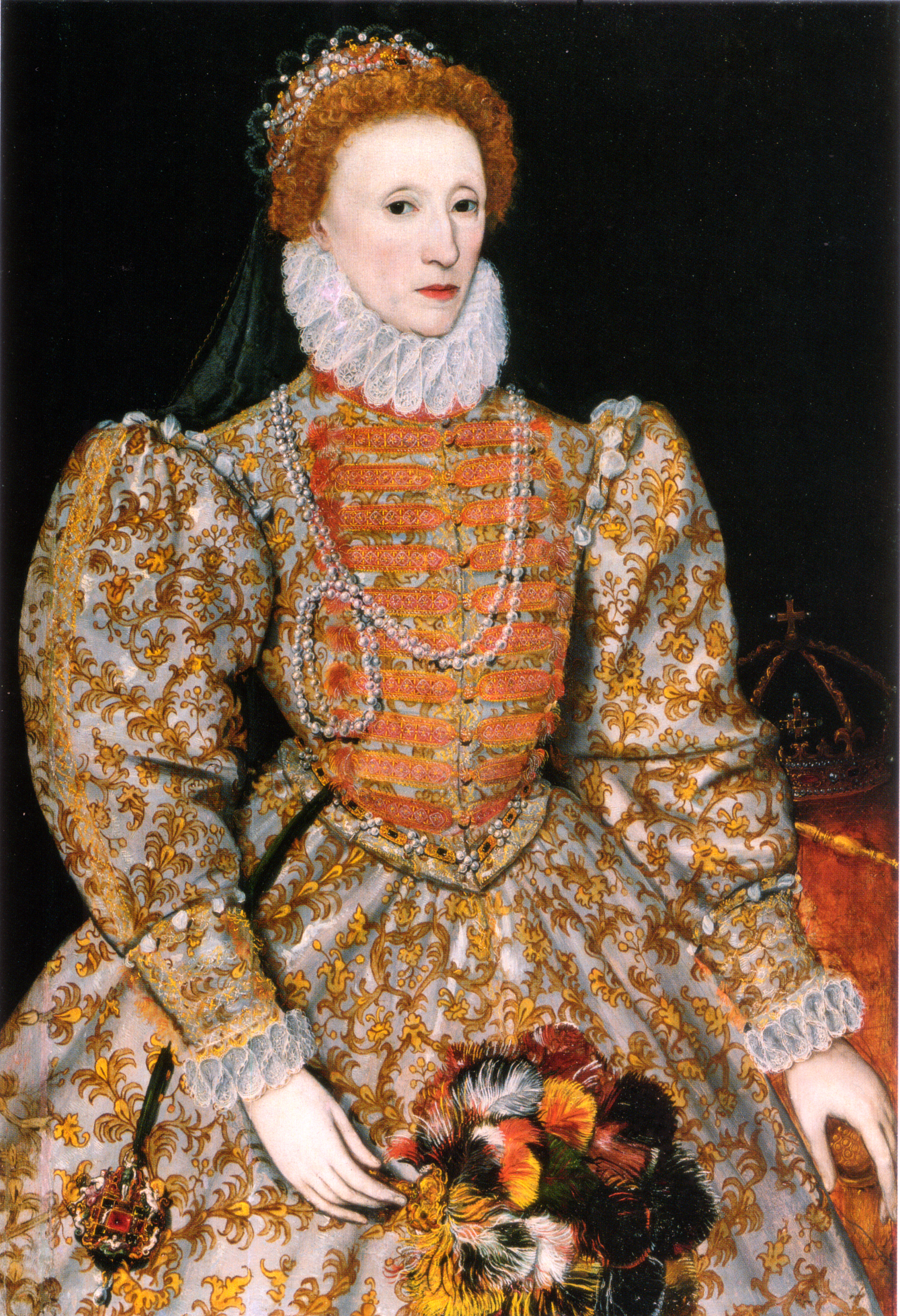
Queen Elizabeth I

During her reign, the Queen would evolve her strategies surrounding English involvement in the Low Countries at a gradual pace, growing in the amount and type of assistance she was willing to give as time progressed. The concerns levied by her Privy Council about the desire of Phillip II to conduct a Spanish expedition into England were particularly strengthened with the assassination of William, the Prince of Orange, in 1588, where it seemed to be established in the mind of Elizabeth that Phillip was willing to go on an offensive.

In beginning her moves towards intervention, the Queen desired on taking an indirect approach to the situation in the Netherlands, seeking to preemptively establish a formal alliance built among Protestant member princes of the Holy Roman Empire to develop a solidified pan-Protestant solidarity for when it seemed appropriate to act. In this, she approached various German princes to forge the alliance:

Frederick II of Denmark, a German prince of the Empire as Duke of Holstein, was considered by Elizabeth to be a key ally. Initially refusing on September 12, 1577, the direct and formal alliance with England that Elizabeth had anticipated, Frederick began during the rest of the 1570s and into the 1580s to come round to Elizabeth's idea of Protestant cooperation. In a series of exchanges, Frederick resolved to mediate between England and Spain in the Dutch conflict: if Frederick's aid was not accepted by Philip II of Spain, "he would close the Sound to their traffic and (if necessary) offer direct military support to their protestant adversaries, including Elizabeth."

Duke Casimir of the Palatinate was one of Elizabeth's closest allies from her earliest approaches to the conflict. In early 1578, with Elizabeth unwilling use English forces after the defeat of the Protestant Dutch army at the Battle of Gembloux and concerned about such a move provoking the French, she approached the Duke with funds to recruit “6,000 Swiss and 5,000 ‘reiters’ to the provinces” to assist the Dutch. The Duke, who was already aligned to the Protestant cause, took advantage of the opportunity, with payment by Elizabeth being “20,000 pounds immediately and the same sum in addition on days of musters, to be charged against the loan of 100,000 pounds.” This payment would later be halted in response to the States' initial dealings with the Duke of Anjou, and then later returned upon the thaw of Elizabeth's opinion on the Duke of Anjou being involved in the conflict.

The Protestant states of the Netherlands under William also dealt officially in the agreement to solidarity which Elizabeth attempted to foster with the other German states. The Prince of Orange, through Daniel Rogers, suggested a deal with Elizabeth on a direct military alliance against Spain. It anticipated war, and looked to act preemptively against Philip II and his ‘crusade of Catholic re-conquest.’ Elizabeth rejected the offer, and instead made a counter-proposal, as a means to draw the Netherlands into unity with the other Protestant states of continental Europe. Other German states within the Holy Roman Empire that were potential allies in direct alliances included Brunswick, Hesse, Württemberg, and Saxony.

Direct involvement became a change in the policy precedence with Elizabeth with the Leicester Expedition into the Low Countries, allowing for English troops directly under the control of an English leader to be present in the region. Publicly, and to avoid the anxiety around direct involvement in the eyes of the Spanish, Elizabeth had released her intentions with the move on the basis of a cultural defense of the Protestant Dutch:

to give aid to the defence of the people afflicted and oppressed in the Low Countries, were not any desire of aggrandizing either herself or her subjects, but to aid the natural people of those countries to defend their towns from sacking and desolation, and thereby to procure them safety, to the honour of God, whom they desire to serve sincerely as Christian people, according to his word, and to enjoy their ancient liberties; to free herself from invading neighbours; and to ensure a continuance of the old-standing intercourse of friendship and merchandise betwixt her people and the inhabitants of those countries.

In November 1585, she wrote a letter to the States-General within the Netherlands for her declaring her candidacy of Robert Dudley, the Earl of Leicester, to lead the expedition, as well as declaring her favor towards the interest of the Low Countries. Later into the campaign, however, she would take contention with the Earl's approaches in objective to the Expedition, in seeking to establish an entirely new government within the Netherlands independent entirely of the Spanish, an option the Queen did not wish to take.

=== Robert Dudley, the Earl of Leicester ===
==== Background with the Low Countries ====
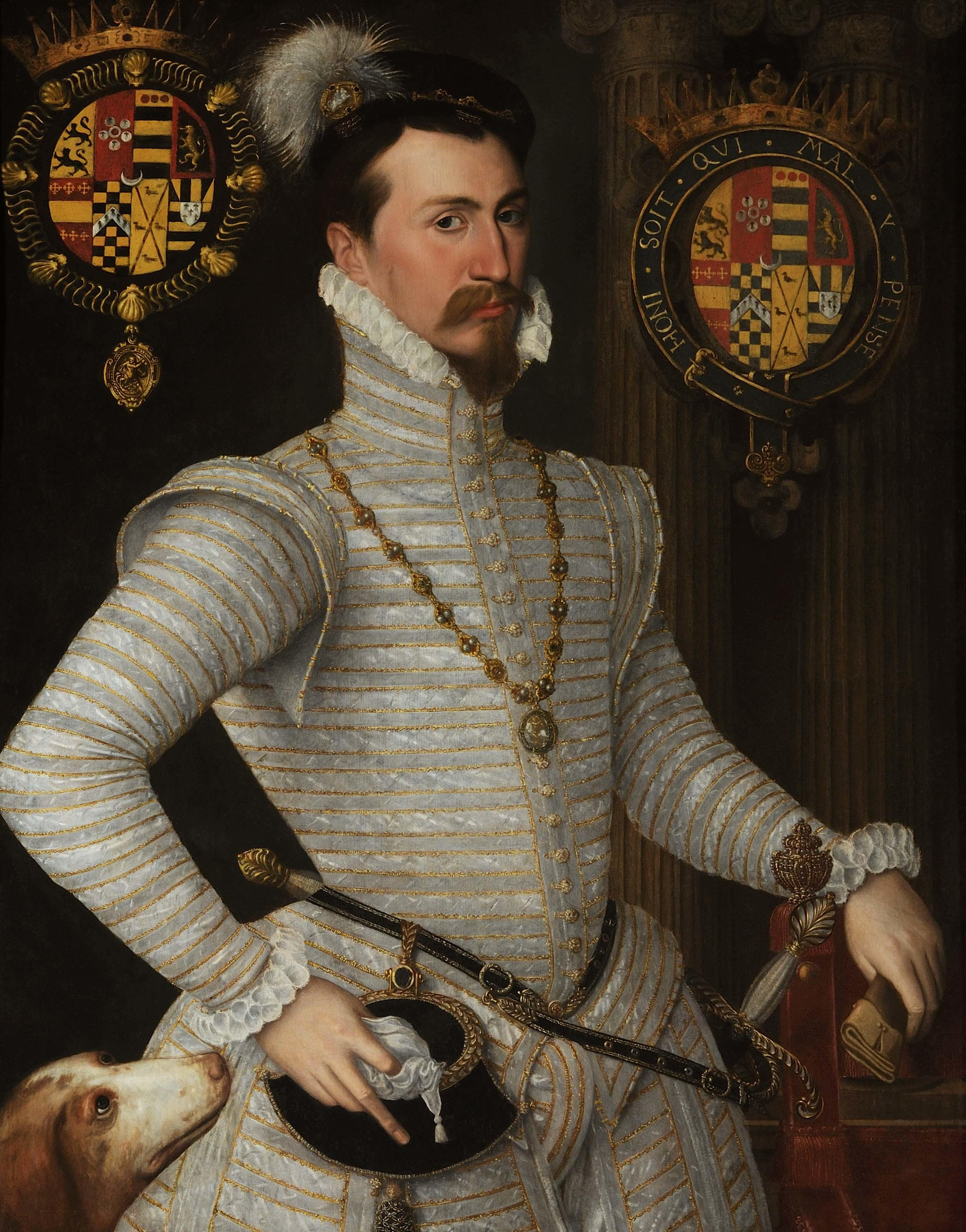
Robert Dudley, the 1st Earl of Leicester

Before the Leicester Expedition was to take place, Robert Dudley, the Earl of Leicester, already had interactions in the Low Countries, being sympathetic to the Protestant cause led by the House of Orange. This intimacy between the Earl and the House of Orange caused him to be a source of fear among those in contest with Orange, such as the House of Croye. The success of the latter Dutch House in blocking direct English aid in the States-General in late 1577 came as an offence to the Earl, who came to division with William of Orange, viewing it as offensive, until William Davison cooled tensions between the two men. Tension would also arise as well between the Earl and the Queen during the Leicester Expedition over the actions that were taken by the former during the campaign.

==== The Leicester Expedition ====
The impetus behind what would become the Leicester Expedition came about from advice given to her by the Privy Council to operate with a stronger active role within the Low Countries. According to John Bruce of the Camden Society, the advice of the Privy Council was to:

send over a considerable body of auxiliary forces, and to place them under the command of some eminent person, who should not merely direct the military operations, but should also assist the States-General with his counsel, and put them in the way of correcting many errors of government into which they have fallen.

Elizabeth had initially disagreed with this advice, fearing primarily of the precedent that could be set in assisting rebellions against a sovereign ruler, especially against Phillip II in consideration to the danger she was in with the Catholic world. However, on 10 August 1585 the Treaty of Nonsuch was concluded between Elizabeth and the States General of the Netherlands forming an alliance between the two countries along the lines of the Privy Council's advice. By September 1585, it was guaranteed that the Queen would nominate Robert Dudley to the Council of State and to the States-General within the Netherlands, due to his perceived intimate knowledge and level of connection to the Queen herself, being a “personal favorite” of hers that also did not have a necessary and irreplaceable role in her Court.

Direct correspondences between Robert Dudley and the Court began on December 1585, in a letter from Francis Walsingham addressed to Dudley, reporting on the Queen's direct instructions for the campaign: stabilize the government, to not engage in battles without “great advantage” assured, to maintain discipline and punishing those who do not honor that call for discipline, to make leaders responsible that forces under their command are at full capacity, to pay soldiers “by the head” with payment disbursed to the captains first, punish leaders who abuse their posts, employ “some well chosen persones” that organize collecting contributions to the war effort, to respect the authority of Dutch nobles as well as especially the children of the late William (of Orange), to clarify that England will not take dominion over the Netherlands at the end of this expedition, and to be available to advise Dutch nobility whenever needed.

The Earl, however, desired to see a return to the Netherlands of the government exercised under the Prince of Orange, who was assassinated the year earlier. This angered the Queen to the Earl's actions, which would become evident when he writes to Walsingham, as well as Elizabeth's Lord Treasurer, Lord Chamberlain, and Vice Chamberlain, acknowledging that the Queen does not appreciate the Earl's own support of this separate Dutch government. Despite understanding this and begging for forgiveness from the Queen, he implores the men he writes to that he is coming solely from a place to benefit the Queen and England as a whole. The height of Elizabeth's discontent with Dudley is explained in letters directly from the Queen to the Earl and delivered by Sir Thomas Heneadge, dated February 10, 1585–6, where she demands him to publicly resign his authority and to inform the States that the actions in accepting the government that Dudley had undertaken did not reflect her wishes as Queen.

== See also ==
- Triple Alliance (1596)
