= English Fury at Mechelen =

1580 sacking of city in Belgium

- Part of the Eighty Years' War
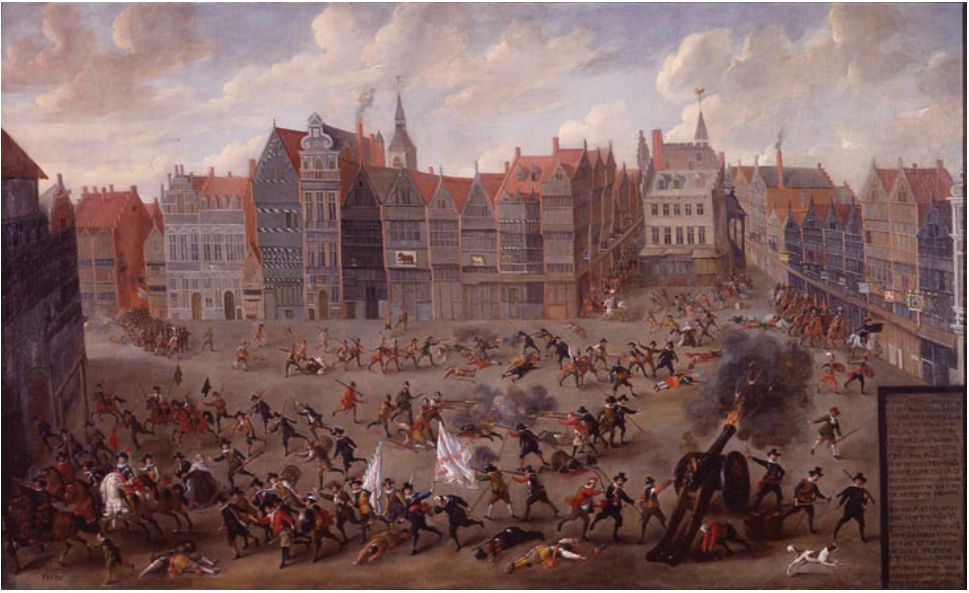
- A painting of the capture of Mechelen by Nicolaas van Eyck
Date	April 9, 1580
Location	Mechelen, Spanish Netherlands (Present day Belgium) 51°01′40″N 4°28′50″E
Result	States-General victory

Belligerents
(Dutch Republic) States-General	Spain

Commanders and leaders
(Dutch Republic) John Norris	Unknown

The English Fury at Mechelen or the Capture of Mechelen was an event in the Eighty Years' War on April 9, 1580. The city of Mechelen (known as Malines in French and historically in English) was conquered by Calvinist rebel forces from Brussels, which included a large contingent of English mercenaries. The city was sacked and many of its religious treasures destroyed or plundered.

== Background ==
After the great Spanish victory in the Battle of Gembloux (31 January 1578), Brabant became the primary battleground between State and Spanish armies. The States-General and Orange had relocated from Brussels to Antwerp and began reinforcing Brussels and surrounding towns with garrisons in defence. The newly defeated States Army was unpopular, and by popular demand of the burghers of Brussels, Olivier van den Tympel's regiment, on the States of Holland's payroll, took over the defence of the capital. Some States companies stationed in Mechelen by Boussu were also replaced by Hollandic companies, probably from the regiment of IJsselstein, while Pontus de Noyelles (lord of Bours) became the governor and military commander of the city of Mechelen.

The population was to pay the troops' wage, but the magistrates wrote to Orange in November 1578 that they could not afford the cost of Pontus' two Hollandic companies at Mechelen, and the two companies at Vilvoorde. Two of the six Hollandic battalions were transferred to Maastricht by Archduke Matthias in January 1579 when it became clear that Parma intended to lay siege to that city. Meanwhile, there were growing religious tensions between the Hollandic soldiers in Mechelen, supported by the city's Calvinist minority, and the Catholic majority of burghers. This culminated in a street battle on 29 May 1579, after which the troops from Holland withdrew from Mechelen. Governor Pontus of Noyelles thanked Orange for (reluctantly) acquiescing to these developments, then defected to the royalist side and made peace with Parma.

Thus, by mid-1579, the Lordship of Mechelen was one of the few territories in the Netherlands that had remained loyal to the Spanish King. Most surrounding cities, like Antwerp, Brussels, and Ghent were controlled by Calvinist rebels. There in 1580, plans were made to take over all remaining loyal cities, to deny the Spanish army any stronghold behind the frontline.

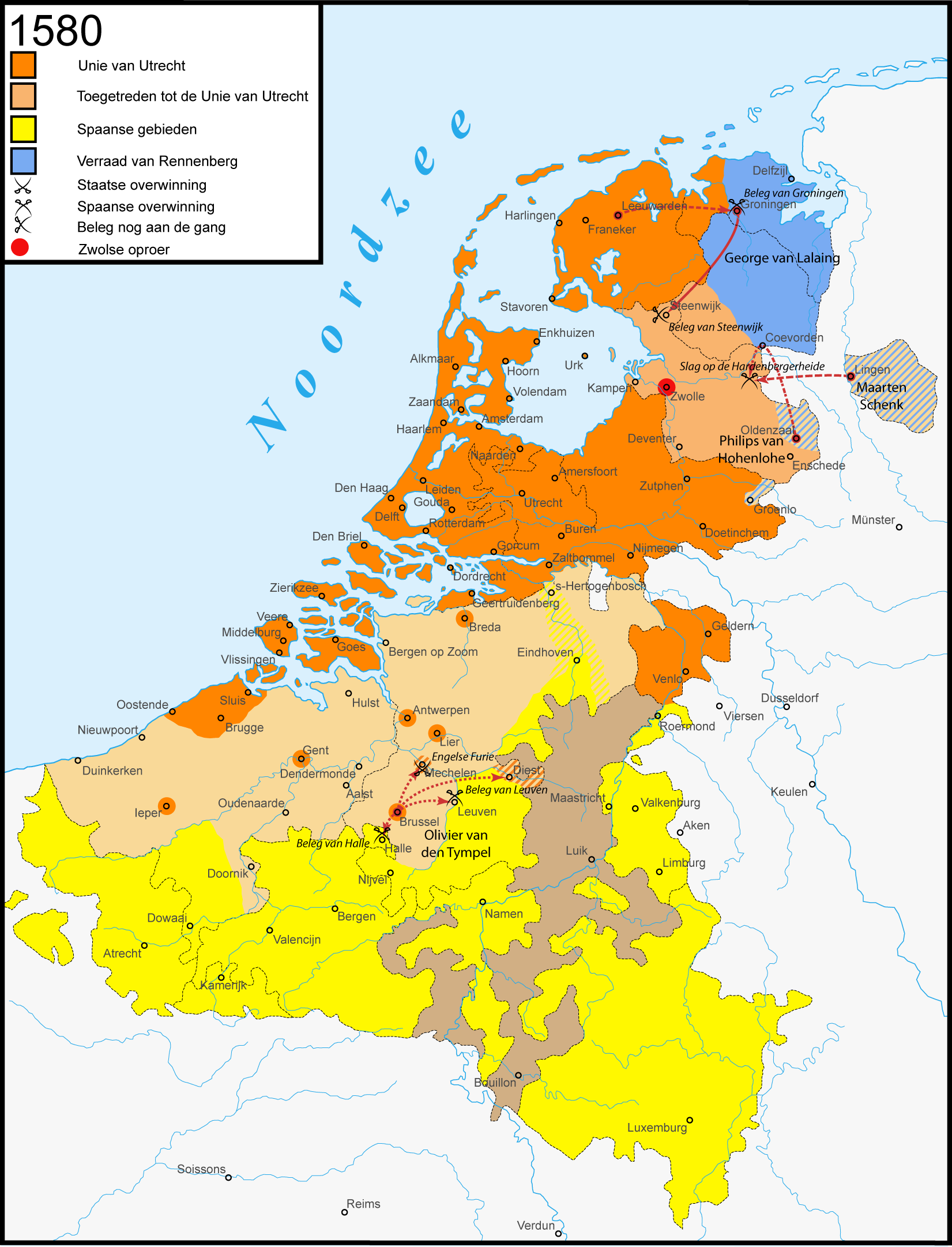
The frontline in 1580

== Capture of Mechelen ==
Just before dawn on 9 April 1580, States troops stormed the city of Mechelen. They were commanded by the Calvinist mayor of Brussels, Olivier van den Tympel, supported by English troops under command of John Norreys (or Edward Norreys according to Tracy 2008) and Scottish under command of Captain Stuart. After a short battle with Mechelen's Schutterij and Spanish troops the city was easily taken.

== Aftermath ==
The English and Scottish mercenaries under van den Tympel turned against the population, plundering homes, churches and monasteries; some tombstones were removed from the town's cemeteries and sold in England. Some sixty civilians were killed and Archbishop Mathias Hovius hid in a cupboard for three days and then fled the city, dressed as a peasant. The Carmelite friar Petrus de Wolf participated in the defence of the city and was killed by John Norreys himself with his bare hands.

Mechelen remained under Calvinist rule until it was reconquered in 1585 by the Spanish under Alexander Farnese, Duke of Parma as one of the last cities in the Southern Netherlands. The event was named the English Fury after the Spanish Fury that hit the city in 1572. However, the looting committed by the English in the same town was longer and more intense than that perpetrated by the Spanish. Contemporary laws of war admitted three days of looting, while that committed by the English lasted nearly an entire month.

== Bibliography ==
- Harline & Put, Craig E. & Eddy F. (2002). Verloren schapen, schurftige herders: de helse dagen van bisschop Mathias Hovius (1542-1620). Davidsfonds/Leuven. ISBN 9789058750631. (Dutch)
- Nolan, Cathal J. (2006). The Age of Wars of Religion, 1000-1650: An Encyclopedia of Global Warfare and Civilization, Volume 1. Greenwood Publishing Group. ISBN 9780313337338.
- Nolan, John S. (1997). Sir John Norreys and the Elizabethan Military World. Liverpool University Press - Liverpool Science Fiction Texts and Studies. ISBN 9780859895484.
- Tracy, J. D. (2008). The Founding of the Dutch Republic: War, Finance, and Politics in Holland 1572–1588. Oxford University Press. ISBN 978-0-19-920911-8.
