= Siege of Maastricht (1579) =

Part of the Eighty Years' War

- Part of the Eighty Years' War
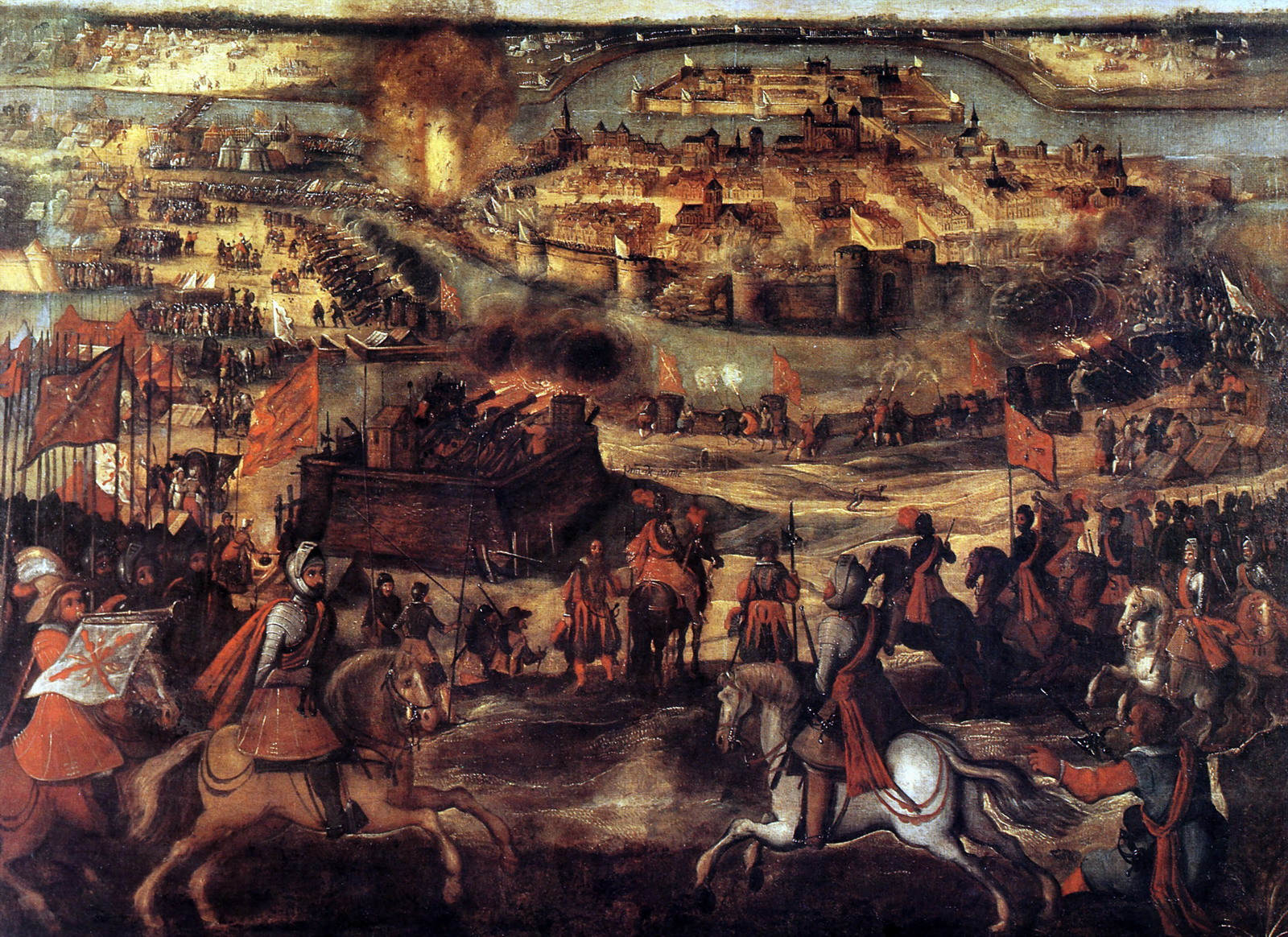
- Spanish troops storming the city of Maastricht.
Date	March 12 – July 1, 1579
Location	Maastricht (present-day the Netherlands)
Result	Spanish victory

Belligerents
(Dutch Republic) States-General	Spain

Commanders and leaders
(Dutch Republic) Melchior von Schwarzenberg † (Dutch Republic) Sebastien Tapin †	(Spain) Alexander Farnese (Spain) Gillis van Berlaymont †

Strength
1,200–2,000	20,000–34,000

Casualties and losses
900–1,000 soldiers, plus 6,000 civilians killed	4,000

The siege of Maastricht was a battle of the Eighty Years' War which lasted from March 12 to July 1, 1579. The Spanish were victorious.

== Prelude ==
=== Political background ===
The Siege of Maastricht was undertaken in a moment in which the Royal authority had almost collapsed in the Spanish Netherlands. A wave of Protestant, popular violence known as Beeldenstorm had erupted in 1566, leading Philip II to dispatch an army under the Duke of Alba to the region in 1567. Alba prosecuted the Protestants and those whose loyalty to the king was under suspicion, implemented a new episcopal reform and defeated an invasion by William of Orange from Germany. However, his fiscal policies, intended to finance the Spanish Army of Flanders, were highly unpopular and led to a new rebellion in the spring of 1572. This quickly spread across Zeeland, Holland and Gelderland, where the Geuzen and Orange's followers took control of many towns and cities. Alba failed to suppress the revolt and was replaced as governor by Luis de Requesens in 1573. The latter coupled military pressure with political negotiations in order to pacify the Low Countries, yet his efforts failed as a consequence of the Spanish bankruptcy of 1575. His sudden death in March 1576 created a power vacuum. The Council of State, which was to rule the country until Philip II designated a new governor, was divided between opposite factions led by the Spaniard Gerónimo de Roda and the Netherlandish nobleman Philippe III de Croÿ, Duke of Aarschot. Over the summer, the inability of the Spanish military command to pay its soldiers resulted in a series of mutinies which prompted the provinces loyal to Philip II to join forces with those rebellious in the Pacification of Ghent with the common goal of expelling the foreign troops and restoring the peace.

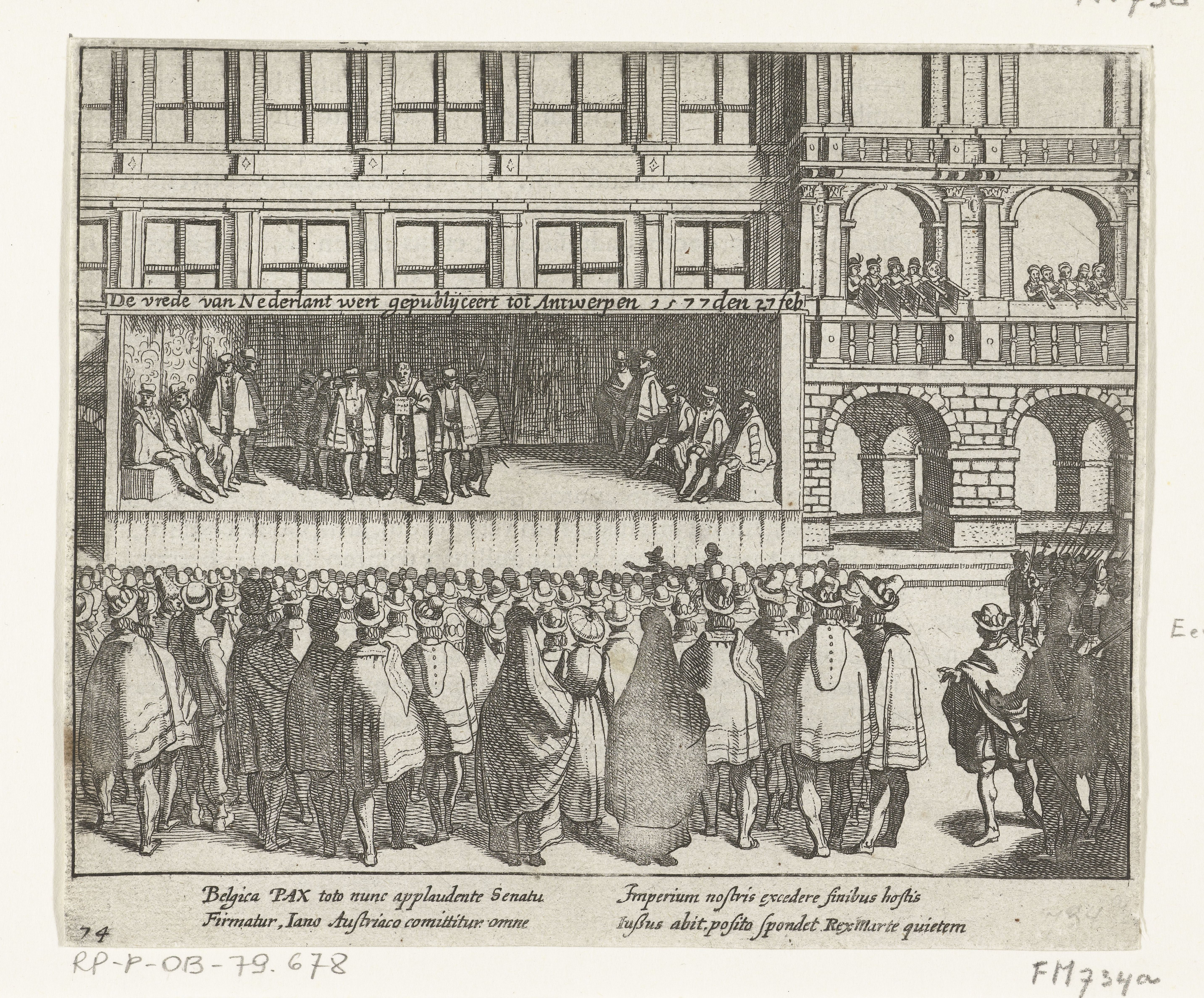
Promulgation of the Perpetual Edict in Antwerp, engraving by Simon Frisius, ca. 1613–1615.

The new governor, John of Austria, illegitimate half-brother to Philip, signed the so-called Perpetual Edict on 12 February 1577, ordering the Spanish troops to leave the Netherlands for Italy in exchange for the States General agreeing to recognize him as governor and to maintain the Catholic religion. The Spanish abandoned the country on 20 March 1577, but the reconciliation proved fruitless, as the provinces of Holland and Zeeland were not willing to return to the Royal obedience without the toleration of the Protestant cult. Orange, as stadtholder of the two provinces, refused to accept John as governor and to participate in the States General summoned by the latter. As Orange's influence was growing, John left Brussels for the safer Namur and recalled the Spanish troops. Aarschot, the most influential Southern noblemen, invited Archduke Matthias, future Holy Roman Emperor, to take John's position, which the States declared vacant. When he arrived on 30 October 1577, Orange, thanks to this popularity, had replaced Aarschot as the leading political figure, and Matthias had to content himself to be a figurehead. On 31 January 1578, the Spanish army routed the States General's force at the Battle of Gembloux and took Leuven on 13 February 1578, forcing Orange and Matthias to abandon the now unsecure Brussels for Antwerp. New prospects opened for Philip II, as the largest silver convoy up to the point had reached Seville in August 1577.

While the Spanish Army went on the offensive, growing religious tensions in Flanders and Brabant led to an increasing factionalism. Calvinists took power in Ghent, and the magistrates of Antwerp, Brussels and Mechelen, originating from the lower nobility and the landed aristocracy, were replaced by burghers. The States troops occupied several reluctant towns in the northern provinces, including Amersfoort, and purged its magistracies. In Holland, Calvinists seized power in Amsterdam and Haarlem, and in Zeeland, at Ter Goes. The Catholic majority in the States General blocked an edict of tolerance and, over the summer of 1578, the States of Hainaut, Artois and the Walloon Flanders declared that they would not accept the Protestant cult. In the same way, Holland and Zeeland refused to tolerate the Catholic cult. The Southern Catholic nobility, organized in a faction known as the Malcontents, asked France for help and, on 13 August 1578, the States General procclaimed Francis of Anjou, brother to the King of France, as 'Defender of the liberties of the Low Countries'. In exchange, 12,000 French soldiers would support the States Army against the Spanish. In turn, the Calvinists from Ghent appealed to John Casimir of the Palatinate-Simmern, a Calvinist too, who entered the Netherlands in autumn ahead a German mercenary army. Three factions were now fighting against other.

=== Military campaigning ===
The Spanish army continued its offensive amidst the Netherlandish inner conflict and made rapid gains. With Leuven secured, John of Austria sent Alexander Farnese, his nephew and close friend, to besiege Zichem. The town was captured, and its garrison executed to discourage further resistance. A quick advance followed: Diest surrendered after a brief negotiation, and Nivelle did the same in early March 1578. Beaumont and Chimay were taken with little or no resistance. On 13 April 1578, the Spanish army was reinforced by the Tercio of the League under Lope de Figueroa, which numbered 2,600 soldiers who had followed the Spanish Road from Milan. Philippeville was then invested and forced to capitulate a few weeks later. Then John went to Namur for a rest and split his army in two different commands. Ottavio Gonzaga, general of the cavalry, was sent to raid the area around Lier and Aarschot, while Farnese, with the bulk of the troops, was tasked with subduing the Duchy of Limburg. On arriving at the capital of the duchy, the town of Limbourg, Farnese ordered an assault over the suburb of Dolhain, which was quickly taken. The artillery was laid shortly thereafter and the States garrison, numbering 1,000 men, surrendered on 14 June 1578. Save for the governor, who was escorted to Aachen, all the States troops joined the Spanish army. Cristóbal de Mondragón, a veteran Spanish colonel of Walloon infantry, was appointed governor of Limburg and ordered to besiege the castle of Dalhem, from where the States troops raided the villages nearby. Despite the strength of the castle, erected over a step rock, it was taken by assault by the Burgundian Regiment of the Baron of Cheveraux, which massacred most of its defenders and residents, to Mondragón's displeasure.

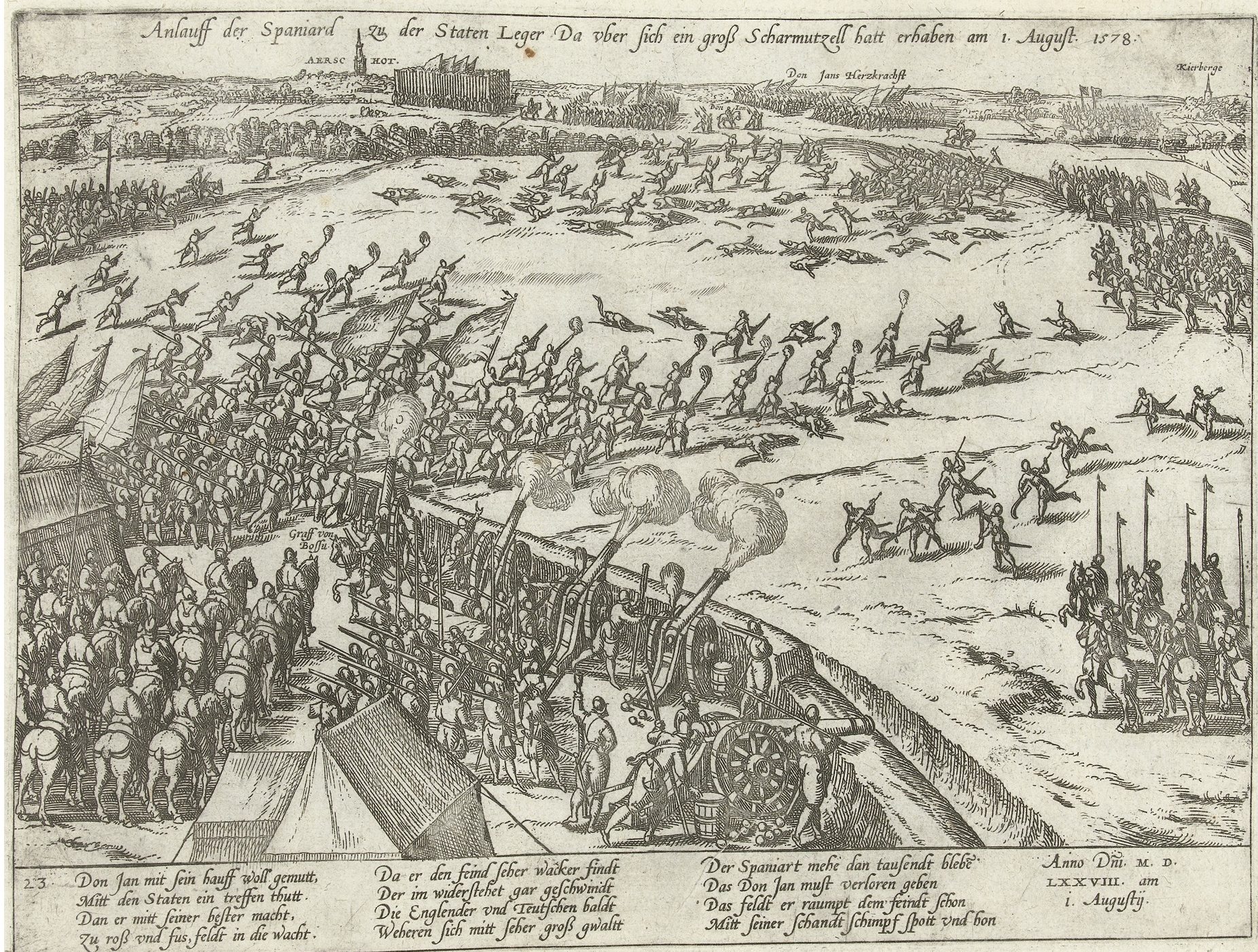
The States victory at the Battle of Rijmenan on 1 August 1578, by Frans Hogenberg, ca. 1588–1580.

The Spanish army faced an unexpected setback in August when John, whom Farnese had already re-joined with his troops, attacked the States Army camp at Rijmenam, near Tienen. The States troops, led by the Count of Bossu, repelled the attack and moved into the offensive, retaking Aarschot, Nivelle and Jemappes. The arrival of the French army under Anjou further worsened the Spanish situation, as it seized Maubeuge, Roeulx, Soignies and Havré, in Hainaut. The imminent arrival of John Casimir's German army led John to retreat back to Namur and entrench his army in a camp at Bouge, in a height between the Sambre and Meuse rivers. There he fell ill from typhoid fever and died on 1 October 1578. According to Ottavio Gonzaga, 'even the stones mourned him', as he was very popular among his men, while Captain Alonso Vázquez noted that even the German mercenaries were saddened. Farnese, his uncle – though they had similar ages, being on their early thirties – and confidant, accepted the appointment of Governor-General by Don John on his death bed until Philip II finalized it. His main concern was to prevent the Catholic Walloon nobility from forging a solid alliance with Anjou.

In November 1578, as the Spanish army was being decimated by diseases, Farnese left the camp at Bouge garrisoned by just six companies and advanced along the right bank of the Meuse with the bulk of the army, then numbering 20,000 men, towards Limburg. He intended to relieve Deventer, which was under siege by a States Army, but its German garrison surrendered before he could send reinforcements. He then encamped his army between Maastricht and Dalhem and began to conceive the siege of the former city. Before that, to isolate Maastricht from Aachen, Cologne and Cleves, a force under Mondragón was sent to capture the towns of Kerpen and Erkelenz on 31 December. Kerpen was invested on 7 January 1579 and taken four days later. The States defenders were executed, which prompted Erkelenz and Geldern to surrender. Then Mondragón sent 500 infantry and 50 horse to capture Straelen, while another force under Pedro de Toledo was dispatched to relieve the Bleijenbeek Castle, whose lord, Maarten Shenk, had declared for the Spanish. While the States troops were driven away, Mondragón completed the Spanish control of the right bank of the Meuse by taking Valkenburg, Wittem and 's-Hertogenrade.

Political map of the Spanish Netherlands in January 1579 with Spanish campaign.

On 10 January 1579 Farnese sent a messenger to the Maastricht, the Spanish Captain Francisco Montesdoca, its former governor, to inform the magistrates that he would confirm the city's privileges if they allowed a Spanish garrison inside. The offer was rejected, but Farnese did not besiege the city immediately. He advanced northwards from Limbourg to Visé on 15 January, aiming at crossing the Meuse. He considered doing this at Born, and later at Echt, but he delayed the operation until the army arrived at Beesel. A company of musketeers was sent to the left bank in boats to protect the laying of a pontoon bridge. The first unit to make it to the opposite side, the Tercio of Francisco de Valdés, was sent to occupy Weert. The crossing was completed in three days despite the bad weather. Excluding Mondragón's force and several troops left in the area around Diest and Leuven under the Marquis del Monte, the Spanish army numbered 25,000 infantry and 8,000 cavalry soldiers. The whole force arrived to the vicinity of Weert on 23 January, the same day that a meeting of delegates from the provinces of Holland, Zeeland, Utrecht, Gelderland, Friesland and the Ommelanden concluded the Union of Utrecht to push for the toleration towards the Protestant cult. The rebel unity was definitely shattered, as on 6 January the provinces of Artois and Hainaut had formed their own Union of Arras, soon joined by the Walloon Flanders, to ensure the Catholic primacy.

Having taken Weert on 29 January, Farnese advanced with most of his forces to meet the States Army, then led by the Huguenot François de La Noue, who withdrew his troops towards Antwerp. By mid-February, Farnese advanced to Eindhoven, but soon turned west to Turnhout. There he conceived the plan of attacking the States Army, entrenched outside Antwerp at the village of Borgerhout, while he negotiated the withdrawal of John Casimir's German army through Count Francis of Saxe-Lauenburg, then serving under Farnese and whose brother Maurice was John Casimir's lieutenant. Maurice agreed with Farnese to leave the Netherlands with the 10,000 remaining German soldiers in exchange for a free passage without informing John Casimir, who had traveled to England. Simultaneously, Farnese achieved another political success on 21 February, when the Union of Arras started negotiations with him, soon followed by the Malcontents, who would join the Spanish army on 6 April with 7,000 men in exchange for 250,000 florins. On 2 March 1579, the Spanish army attacked the remaining States troops, mostly French, English and Scottish under De la Noue and John Norreys, at their camp in Borgerhout, and drove them into Antwerp.

With the States Army neutralized and the rebels divided, Farnese held a war council at Turnhout and informed his commanders about his intention of besieging Maastricht, whose control he deemed key to prevent the arrival of reinforcements to the rebels from Germany, as well as to ensure that the Prince-bishop of Liège, Gerard van Groesbeeck, would cooperate with them. At that moment, peace conversations brokered by the Imperial authorities were about to begin at Cologne. The Spanish delegation was led by Carlo d'Aragona Tagliavia, Duke of Terranova, and the States one by the Duke of Aarschot, while Count Otto Heinrich von Schwarzenberg in name of the Empire, and Giovanni Battista Castagna, papal lagate to Cologne, in name of the pope, acted as mediators. They asked Farnese to delay his offensive while the talks were ongoing, but he utterly refused, going instead to besiege Maastricht.

== Siege ==
=== Preparations ===
With a population of about 15,000 to 17,500 people, Maastricht was one of the largest cities in the Low Countries, yet its prosperity, based on its textile factories and breweries, had diminished in the ten years prior to the siege because the interruption of the trade due to the disturbances, and the military constraints over the population. The garrison began to prepare for a siege already in November 1578, while the Spanish Army was encamped between Maastricht and Dalhem. All those whose loyalty was under suspicion were expelled from the city, vigilance was reinforced, gunpowder was acquired in Germany, cannons were cast in the city's foundries, and the peasants from the vicinity who sheltered in the city were armed with pikes and organized in companies, or put to work in the fortifications. On 10 January 1579, the governor of Maastricht, Melchior von Schwarzenberg, asked Archduke Matthias for money, and on 13 and 14 January, he requested reinforcements, both cavalry and infantry, although they failed to arrive. According to Famiano Strada, the garrison numbered 1,200 soldiers, mostly French, Scottish and English, and about 6,000 armed burghers. Captain Alonso Vázquez put the strength of the defenders at 4,000 'of the most experienced and veteran soldiers among those of the States of Flanders, and well disciplined'.

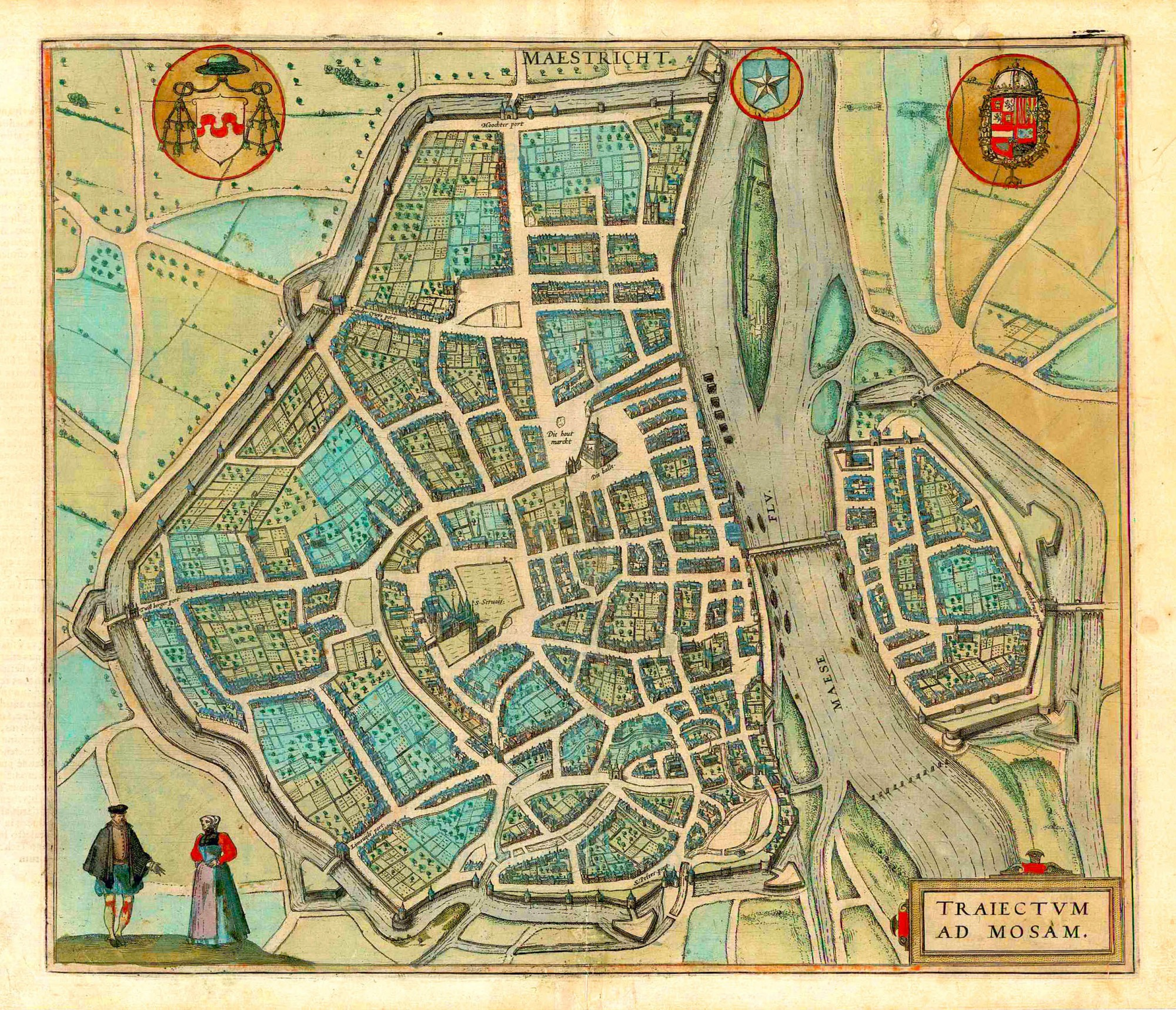
Map of Maastricht in the Civitates Orbis Terrarum by Frans Hogenberg and Georg Braun, 1575.

While Schwarzenberg was the senior commander, the man responsible of the defense was sergeant major Sébastian Tapine, a Lorrainer military engineer who had served under François de la Noue in the Siege of La Rochelle during the French Wars of Religion. Tapine's skills were praised by the Spanish, being labeled by Alonso Vázquez as 'a brave soldier and a great engineer, because in the defense of Maastricht he did things extraordinary and never seen in the war'. He was assisted by a Spanish defector, Captain Manzano, who came from a village near Ocaña. In the months before the siege, Tapine put thousands of men and women, nuns included, to repair the city walls and to strengthen them with earthworks. He also ordered ravelins with their moats to be erected in front of the gates, and the city moat to be cleansed and deepened. Additionally, he had casemates built on the walls and tunnels dug under the counterscarp. Moreover, he opened sally gates in the covertway to allow the burghers to launch surprise attacks against the besiegers. Finally, he built lunettes, traverses and other defenses inside the city.

On the Spanish side, preparations began in March, when Farnese ordered Gilles de Berlaymont, general of the artillery, to leave Namur for Liège and organize the transportation down the Meuse of 48 cannons, 3 culverins, 50,005 cannonballs and 500 quintals of powder. Ottavio Gonzaga, general of the cavalry, was dispatched to invest Maastricht from the right bank of the Meuse leading a substantial cavalry force, while Maestre de Campo Lope de Figueroa was entrusted the blockade of the city from the opposite bank leading his tercio, a Walloon foot regiment and four cavalry companies. Farnese advanced from Turnhout on 4 March 1579 with the bulk of the army and arrived to the vicinity of Maastrich four days later. He decided to fix his residence during the siege at the Pietersheim Castle, in Lanaken, belonging to the Merode family and located one hour from Maastricht. As the castle was garrisoned by States soldiers, he sent Lope de Figueroa and Marcos de Isaba with their respective foot companies and two cannons to besiege the fortress. The States troops surrendered before the artillery was laid and they were spared, though the Spanish troops looted the castle.

As cold persisted over March, the Spanish troops looked for lodgement in the villages nearby. The States troops set several of them on fire, but Figueroa drove them off and captured several of the arsonists. Meanwhile, Cristóbal de Mondragón invested Maastricht from the German side of the Meuse in command of a large force of Walloon and German soldiers. To ease the communications between the two sections of the besieging force, two pontoon bridges were laid over the river, one north of the city, at Haren, and another south of it, at Heugem. The Spanish tercio of Figueroa, as well as the German foot regiments of Hannibal Altemps and Karl von Mansfeld, encamped on the left bank of the Meuse, in front of the Hochterpoort; the Spanish tercio of Francisco de Valdés took positions before the Brussels gate, and that under Hernando de Toledo encamped before the Tongeren gate. The German infantry regiments of Frundsberg and Fugger, as well as the Walloon regiment of the Count of Roeulx, remained at Pietersheim.

=== First assault ===
As the siege began during a market day, hundreds of peasants from the villages around Maastricht found themselves enclosed inside the city. Schwarzenberg ordered the rationing of the food and appointed men to take loans from the local merchants at a reasonable interest to allow the purchase of provisions. In the meantime, the besiegers built four earth forts on the side of Brabant to block the way to any force that attempted to relieve the city, the first one at the village of Hunnenberg, on the course of the Jeker river, which flows towards Maastricht, and the other three in front of the Tongeren gate, the bulwark of Saint Servaas and the Boschpoort, opposite to the church of the Teutonic Order. Peter Ernst von Mansfeld, governor of Luxemburg, had summoned thousands of pioneers for the siege works, but, as they had not arrived yet, the soldiers undertook the construction of the forts. Farnese himself took a shovel to inspire them, and the redoubts were put in defense in two days. They were square-shaped, with a bulwark on each corner, and surrounded by a moat. They were designed by the Italian military engineers Giovanni Battista Platti and Propercio Barocci. On the German side, Mondragón built two forts in front of the suburb of Wyck.

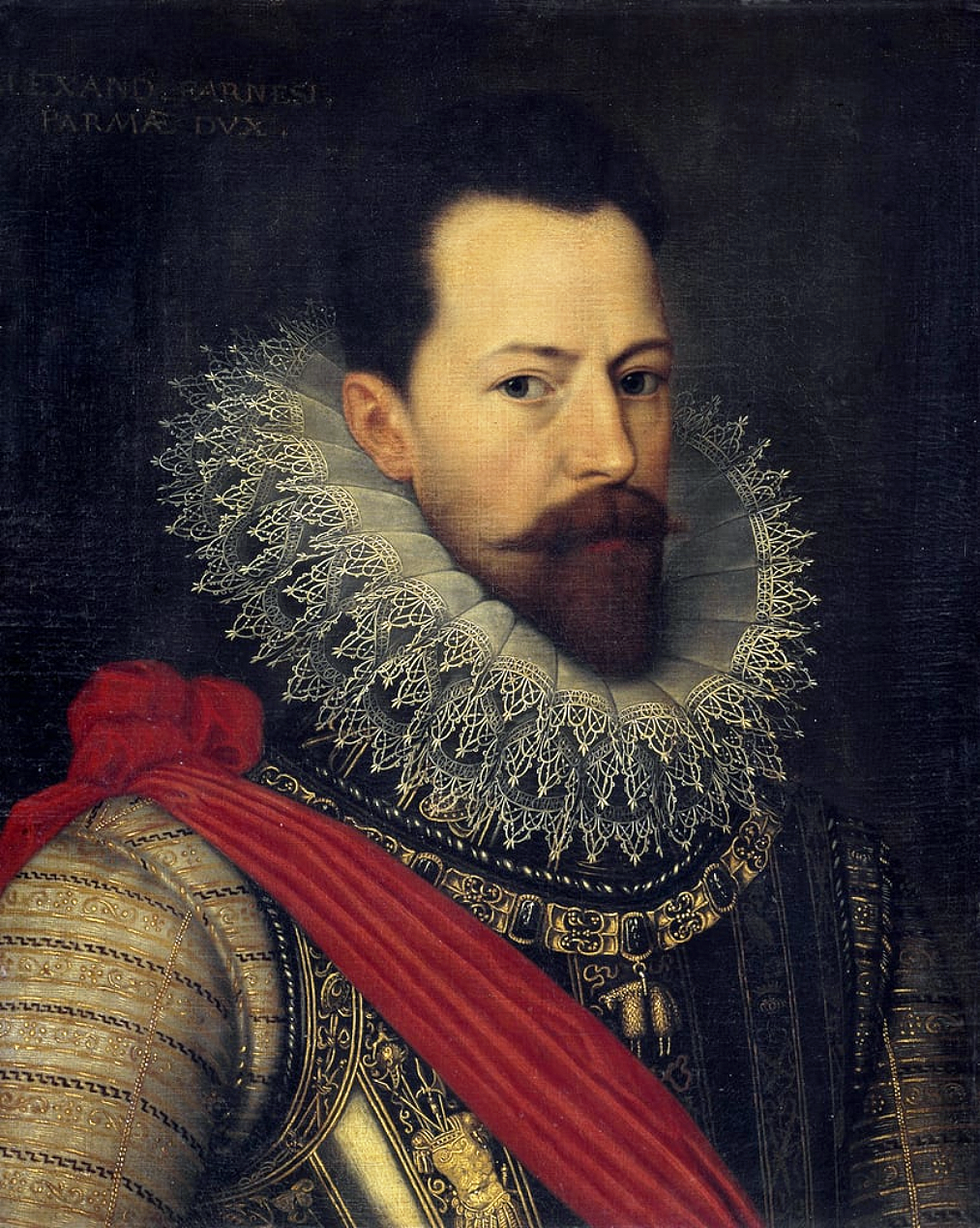
Portrait of Alexander Farnese by Otto van Veen, ca. 1585.

Farnese asked Maastricht's former governor, Francisco Montesdoca, and Maestre de Campo Hernando de Toledo, who had spent several years in garrison duties there, about the city's weak points, but they were unable to answer. Farnese and his chief engineer, Gabrio Serbelloni, intended to start the approach towards the Boschpoort, whose fortifications they deemed the weakest. Besides, they were close to the Meuse, which would allow Mondragón to support the attack from the opposite bank. However, Berlaymont had a different opinion. He argued that the ground near the Boschpoort was low, and therefore exposed to floods in case of heavy rains, and also that it was very open, so the troops would be too exposed to the artillery fire from Maastricht's walls. Farnese followed Berlaymont's advice and directed the approaches towards the Tongeren gate, chiefly to a tower located between that gate and the Pieterspoort, which had a ravelin in front of it. There, the roads were wider and deeper, and could be used as trenches. The work was assigned to the Spanish infantry, which opened trenches towards the tower and, by 20 March 1579, managed to reach the moat.

Farnese ordered the ravelin to be carried by assault on 23 March 1579. The attack was entrusted to the Spanish foot companies under Francisco de Aguilar, Gaspar Ortiz and Sancho Ladrón. When the assault became imminent, Tapin ordered additional artillery to be brought to the rampart behind the ravelin and the building of an earthwork in front of the gate. Moreover, in order to increase the willingness of his men to fight to the bitter end, he had twenty Spanish prisoners thrown into the Meuse with a weight on their feet. To prepare the assault, Farnese ordered Berlaymont to batter the entrance to the ravelin from the city walls with eight cannons. Captain Vázquez stated that, nevertheless, the artillery general did it just with three pieces because Farnese gave his orders through Count Guido di San Giorgio, from Monferrato, who was his confidant and a well-taught military theorist, but who Berlaymont despised because of his lack of experience. On the other hand, the anonymous Chronicle of St. Servaas, written by an inhabitant of the city, mentions that the bombardment was carried out by five cannons which shot over 300 cannonballs. The assault was launched after the cannonade and, although the Spanish infantry managed to seize most of the ravelin, it was forced to abandon it because of the artillery and musketry fire from the walls.

=== Underground fighting ===
After the failed assault, Farnese ordered Berlaymont to batter the ravelin between the Tongeren gate and the Pieterspoort with eight cannons and two culverins, yet the damages were repaired during the night. Realizing the readiness of the defenders, he ordered additional attacks over other points of the walls. The tercio of Hernando de Toledo was entirely deployed in the approaches towards the aforesaid ravelin while sappers dug mines towards the rampart, Lope de Figueroa was instructed to dig approaches towards St. Antonius gate with his tercio, and Francisco de Valdés to do the same towards the Brussels gate in command of the German and Walloon units. To motivate the sappers, Farnese sent them bread, cheese and beer. On the other hand, as he lacked of money to pay the troops, he asked for loans at Liège and sent his jewellery and cutlery to the bankers as payment guarantees.

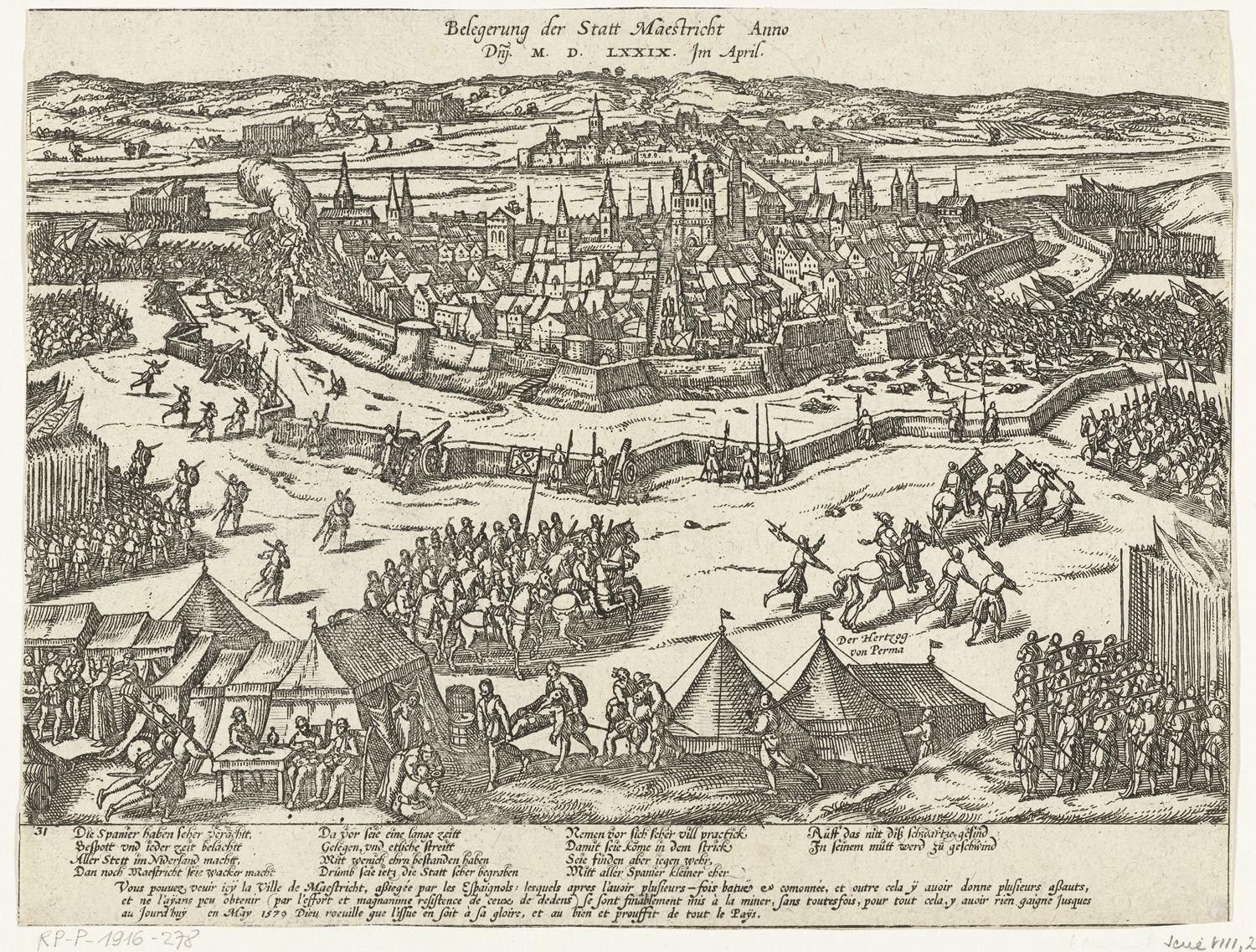
Engraving of the siege by Frans Hogenberg, ca. 1589–1581.

By 26 March 1579, the Spanish battery had been increased to 12 cannons in the plain before Maastricht and 2 culverins in a height nearby. More than 11,000 shots had been fired over the city since 20 March, the highest caliber being of 42 pounds. That same day, two mines were detonated with no result other than further hindering the assault over the ravelin. Farnese even considered lifting the siege, but he finally persisted so as not to lose reputation. In the following days, fighting focused on the mines and counter-mines dug by the Spanish and Dutch sappers. One of the Spanish galleries was intercepted by a Dutch counter-mine. Having at first blocked the way with planks, then the Dutch sappers poured a large vat of boiling water over the hole, scalding the men who worked in the mine and forcing them to abandon it. Another gallery was intercepted, and this time Tapin ordered an amount of green wood to be set on fire at the entrance of the counter-mine to propel the smoke over the Spanish gallery by using bellows from the pipe organ of the Basilica of Saint Servatius. Next day, 31 March, Farnese ordered a number of planks to be loopholed and sent a few dozen Spanish soldiers down the mines to claim them back. Firing from behind the planks and pushing the Dutch with pikes, the Spanish were able to re-occupy the galleries.

The same day in the afternoon, aiming at taking revenge, the defenders launched a sortie over the Spanish trenches spanning from the Brussels gate to the St. Antonius gate. Tapin himself was in command. 600 foot soldiers sallied across the Kruispoort, and 60 horsemen across the Boschpoort. The Spanish soldiers were caught off guard, most of them having a meal and with the matches of the arquebuses off. Just Captain Pedro de Guzmán and 12 of his soldiers offered some resistance before being killed. The Spanish casualties amounted to 35 'of the best soldiers in the army' dead, according to Vázquez, or to 48 killed and 50 wounded, according to Strada. The Dutch lost few to no men and destroyed 150 paces of trench. Farnese, who was conferencing with Mondragón on the other side of the Meuse, was angry on his return, as all the Maestres de Campo were dining with Ottavio Gonzaga at the encampment of the cavalry while the sortie took place.

=== Second assault ===
The defenders launched several additional sorties from 1 April to 3 April 1579 to hinder the Spanish siege works. In the largest one, 200 Spanish soldiers were killed, among them Captain Caravantes, who had been appointed less than two weeks before. Five sappers were captured and brought to the city. After the senior one was drowned in the Meuse when he refused to cooperate with the defenders, the remaining four agreed. Also on early April, Captain Willem de Riddere, along seven or eight men, managed to sneak through the Spanish lines in a boat down the Meuse and went to Antwerp to call for help. A few days later, a mail pigeon carrying a message from the States General which promised relief by 15 April was intercepted by the Spanish, prompting Farnese to order a general assault on 8 April. The day before, he summoned the senior officers and instructed them to ready the artillery on their posts and to prepare the mines to be blown.

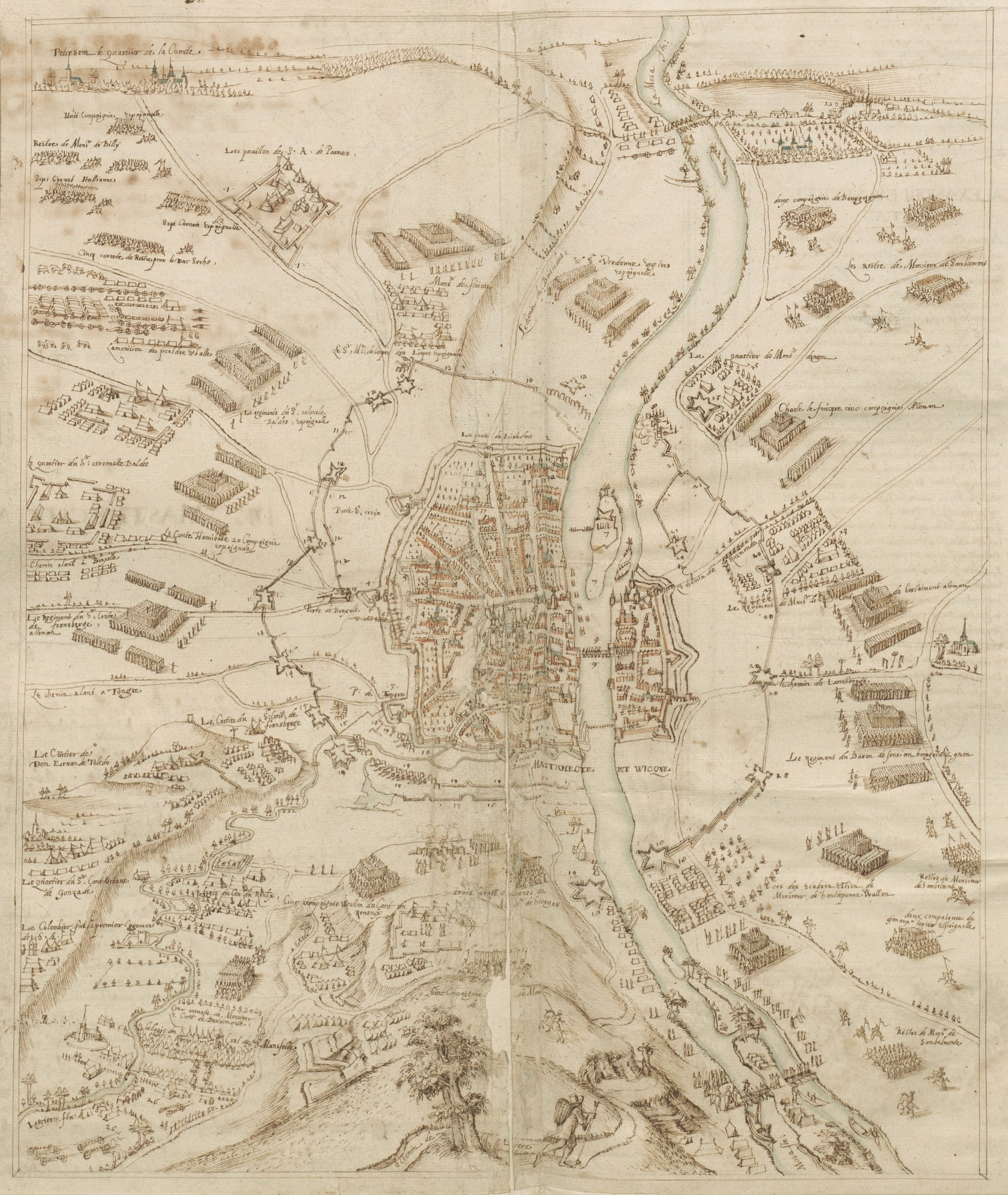
Map of Maastricht and the Spanish circumvallation line around it by the Walloon military engineer Pierre Le Poivre, 1615.

One of the mines was ignited that day below the ravelin of the Tongeren gate, whose tip was seriously damaged. Farnese then ordered Captain Antonio Trancoso to assault it in command of about 80 soldiers from his company. They scaled the ruined rampart, only to discover that the defenders had erected behind it a second parapet with a moat and a stockade. After a fierce fight, the Spanish took control of the ravelin, though Trancoso was badly wounded and died next day. Tapin immediately ordered a counter-attack across the gate, which ultimately failed. Several prisoners were taken on both sides. One of them, Alessandro Cavalca, a gentleman from the entourage of Farnese, was drowned next day in the Meuse with a rock tied around his neck.

On the morning of 9 April 1579, while men took their positions for the assault, the moat of the Boschpoort was emptied through breaches dug by the sappers while Mondragón subjected the gate to a heavy bombardment from the Wyck side with six cannons. Meanwhile, 20 cannons battered the walls in two points near the Tongeren gate and the Boschpoort. The assault column directed to this gate consisted of the Tercio of Lope de Figueroa, the Tercio of Francisco de Valdés, six German foot companies from the Regiment of Altemps and five Walloon companies. The eight remaining companies under Altemps were left in reserve. The Tongeren gate was to be taken by the Tercio of Hernando de Toledo and six German companies of the Regiment of Frundsberg under Gilles de Berlaymont. A detachment from the Regiment of Fugger remained in reserve. In Maastricht, Tapin led the defense of the Boschpoort, which he deemed the weakest point, and Manzano was in charge of the Tongeren gate.

Before giving the order to assault Maastricht, Farnese sent two officers to inspect the moat. One stated that it was empty enough, but the other argued the contrary. Farnese then wanted to make an inspection personally, but his war council dissuaded him, and he sent instead Guido di San Giorgio, who reported that the moat was shallow enough. Just before the assault, one mine was blown under a platform that the defenders had erected to defend the Tongeren gate. A second mine was ignited too, but it had been counter-mined by the Dutch from below and inflicted no damage. The rubble and the earth from the walls, as well as the fascine thrown by the pioneers into the moat, eased the way for the Spanish soldiers. The attack over the Boschpoort was headed by a volunteer forlorn hope formed mainly by young Italian noblemen led by Fabio Farnese, nephew to Alessandro, whom Count Mansfeld had assigned to the Tercio of Figueroa. The first two men to reach the top of the breach, Count Nofri and Antonio Simoneta, Lord of Torricella, were immediately dispatched by the defenders. Supported by Vasco de Zúñiga and the Marquis of Malaspina, Fabio Farnese managed to push the Dutch back, only to be killed shortly after together with nearly all his companions.

The assault on the Tongeren gate was ill-coordinated, as the German and Walloon infantry, deployed on the right wing, attacked before the Tercio of Hernando de Toledo was ready. They were met by heavy musketry fire and decimated by the shots of cannons loaded with nails and chains. The Dutch also threw boiling water, stones, incendiary devices and scythed carts over the attackers, yet they were close to breaking through thanks to a stratagem by the Count of Mansfeld, who sent horsemen to the Tongeren gate and the Boschpoort to spread news that the assault had succeeded in the other point. In the end, Farnese realized that the attack was doomed when Tapin ordered the garrison of a tower near the Boschpoort, in the Spanish right flank, which had remained silent till then, to open fire with light cannons, heavy muskets and arquebuses. The Catholic casualties were high. Vázquez admitted that 700 'chosen Spaniards' were killed, including Count San Giorgio. On the other hand, Farnese reported to Philip II in 1579 that since the beginning of the siege to 9 April, 400 Spanish soldiers had been killed, 400 were recovering at the field hospital, 130 wounded had been sent to Liège, and 200 additional wounded were being treated at their own expense in the encampments.

=== Continuation of the siege ===
After the failed assault, Farnese summoned his war council to decide on the next movement. A new assault was deemed impossible due to the lack of gunpowder and lead, which had to be brought from Luxemburg. Therefore, it was decided to build a massive artillery platform facing the Brussels gate to easily batter the walls and, notably, to prevent the defenders from erecting additional fortifications before the gate. That section of the wall was particularly strong, as a large bastion with loopholes and a deep moat had been built in front of the gate. Moreover, the bastion contained a second fortification, also surrounded by a moat and linked to the first and to the Brussels gate through narrow bridges over the moats. One large tower and four small ones defended the access to the city. On the other hand, the ground in front of it was high enough for an artillery platform capable of subjecting Maastricht to a bombardment from above to be placed.

As the States-General were assembling forces to march in relief of Maastricht, the Spanish command also decided to build a circumvallation line on both sides of the Meuse to fully isolate the city. The soldiers were exhausted and many pioneers had left the camp, so Farnese dispatched cavalry troops to gather peasants from the villages nearby and hired 3,000 coal miners from Liège. Meteren attributed the willingness of the Liegois to collaborate with the Spanish to the fact that they were all Catholics, to the maneuvers of Gerard van Groesbeeck, Prince-bishop of Liège – who shared the sovereignty of Maastricht with Philip II and was resentful of the city's independence – and to the grudge of the people from Liège towards the Netherlanders. The arrival of the new contingents of pioneers allowed a cordon of earthen forts linked by ramparts to be quickly put in defense. Eleven redoubts were built on the Brabant side, and five in front of Wyck.

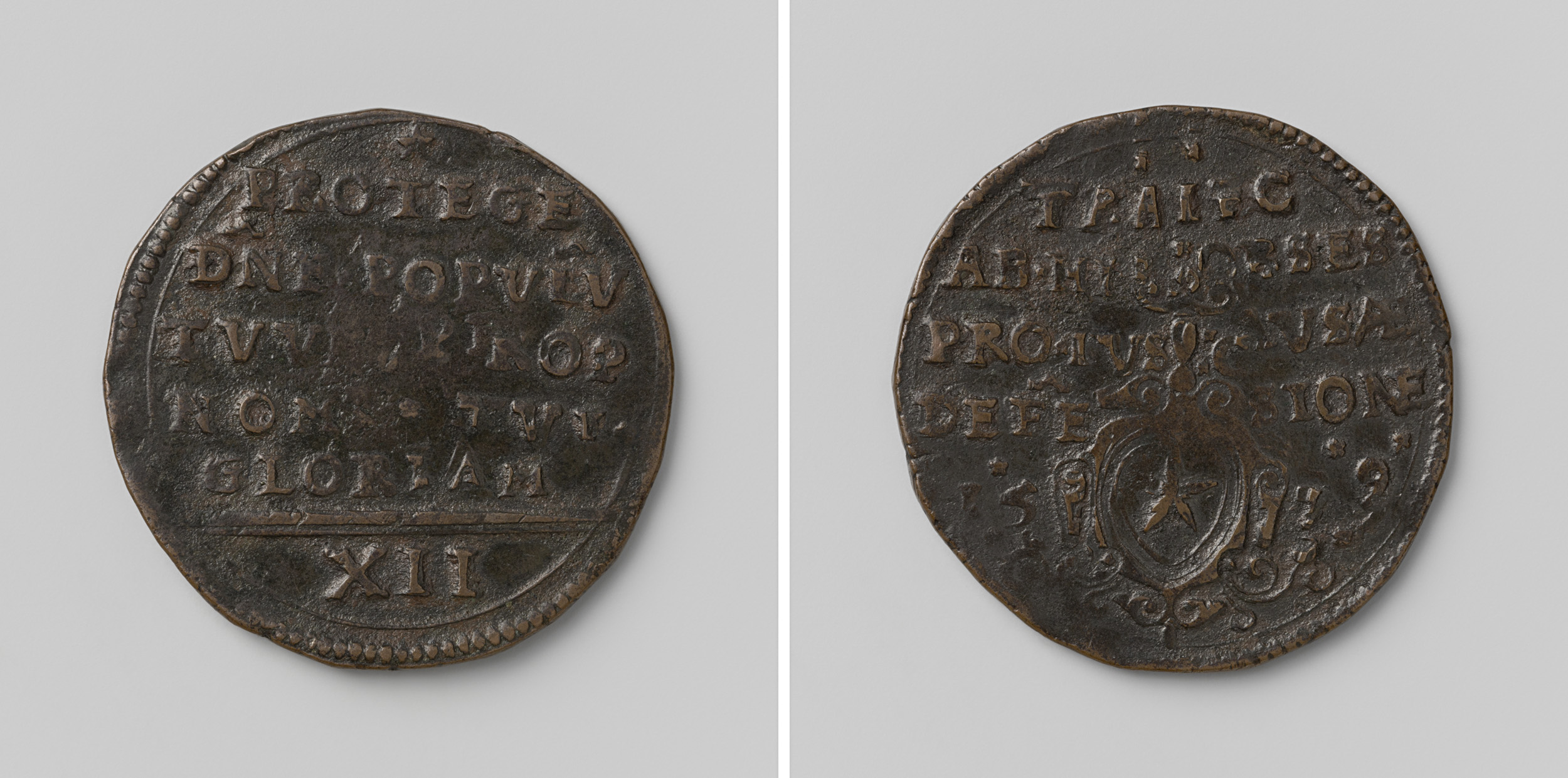
Obverse and reverse of an emergency coin issued by the governor of Maastricht during the siege.

Preparations for the relief of Maastricht had accelerated after the arrival of Willem de Riddere to Antwerp in early April 1579. The States recruited 3,000 to 4,000 reiters in Gelderland and intended to mobilize a large infantry force. However, most of the Walloon Catholic units refused to intervene – and would change sides over the summer – forcing the States to levy money across the provinces under their control to recruit new companies and to mobilize veteran soldiers detached to garrison duties. In the end, a force of nearly 100 foot companies – 15,000 to 20,000 infantry – and 3,000 cavalry soldiers under John of Nassau-Dillenburg, brother of the Prince of Orange, and Count Philip of Hohenlohe-Neuenstein advanced to the relief. However, a reconnaissance by Hohenlohe-Neuenstein himself revealed that the Spanish army was well entrenched, so they withdrew and the States opted for a political approach to ease the siege. They asked for a truce to the representative of Philip II in the peace talks at Cologne, the Duke of Terranova. The answer was delayed until 23 June 1579, when Terranova and Farnese informed the States commissioners that they would only accept the surrender of Maastricht.

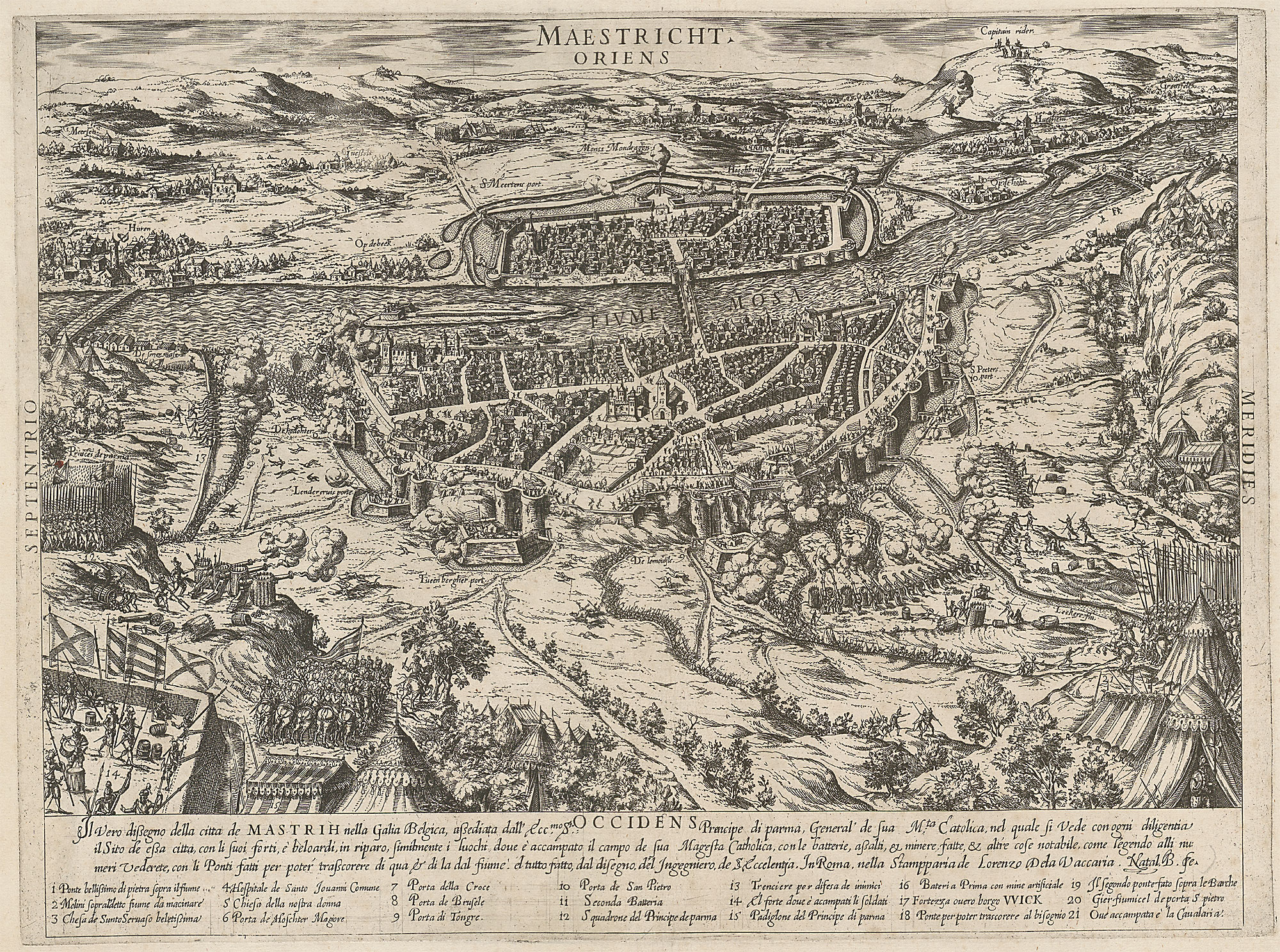
Engraving of the siege by Natale Bonifazio, ca. 1580.

While the conversations took place, the artillery platform was quickly erected with gabions made from wickerwork and filled with earth that were stacked on top of each other and supported by poles. These were crafted with help from the wives of the German soldiers. When finished, it measured about 35 meters wide and 40 meters high. Three cannons and two dozen of the best musketeers of the Spanish army were posted on top. Meanwhile, in order to put the city under a cross-fire, Spanish troops landed from boats on the St. Antonius island, in the middle of the Meuse, and started to entrench themselves there, but were promptly driven away by the fire from Maastricht.

The situation inside the city was becoming increasingly gloomy. Without news from outside since 18 April 1579, Schwarzenberg ordered emergency coins valued at half, one and two stuivers to be minted in red copper on 28 April. This became the only money of legal course in Maastricht during the siege, and the prices of food, drinks and clothes were regulated by the military command. Food restrictions were imposed on 4 May 1579 when Schwarzenberg ordered the two deans of the butchers' guild to inspect every house and stable in the city to prepare a list of the extant cattle. The burghers complained, as they had fed the garrison for longer than a year. Each soldier was paid four stuivers daily, the stonemason masters ten, and the poor people were fed at the expense of the town council, but the burghers were unable to exert their offices and received no compensation. Moreover, on 22 May, those who possessed wheat, rye or other grain in a quantity considered larger than sufficient to meet their basic needs, were ordered to sell it at the market at a fixed price.

=== Capture and sack of the city ===
With supporting fire from the platform recently erected, the Spanish focused on capturing the bastion of the Brussels gate. The fire from above made the Dutch defense difficult, leading Tapin to order the fortification to be gradually demolished. Despite the musketry fire from the casemates in the wall, the Spanish sappers reached the moat and started to mine the second line of defense. Farnese directed two batteries of four cannons each to batter the bridge linking the Brussels gate and the second bastion. Under heavy pressure, the Dutch troops withdrew into Maastricht and the Spanish took possession of the ruined outer works spanning 300 paces from the Brussels gate to the St. Servaas tower, on its left, and 150 paces to its right. Three mines were dug beneath the moat and blown under the walls, causing severe damage around the tower of St. Servaas, and allowing the Spanish to gain control of the ruined walls. After that, Captain Gaspar Ortiz led his company in an assault over one of the towers of the Brussels gate and seized it. Several scaffolds were built above, from which the Spanish musketeers fired over the defenders who moved around the streets and squares nearby.

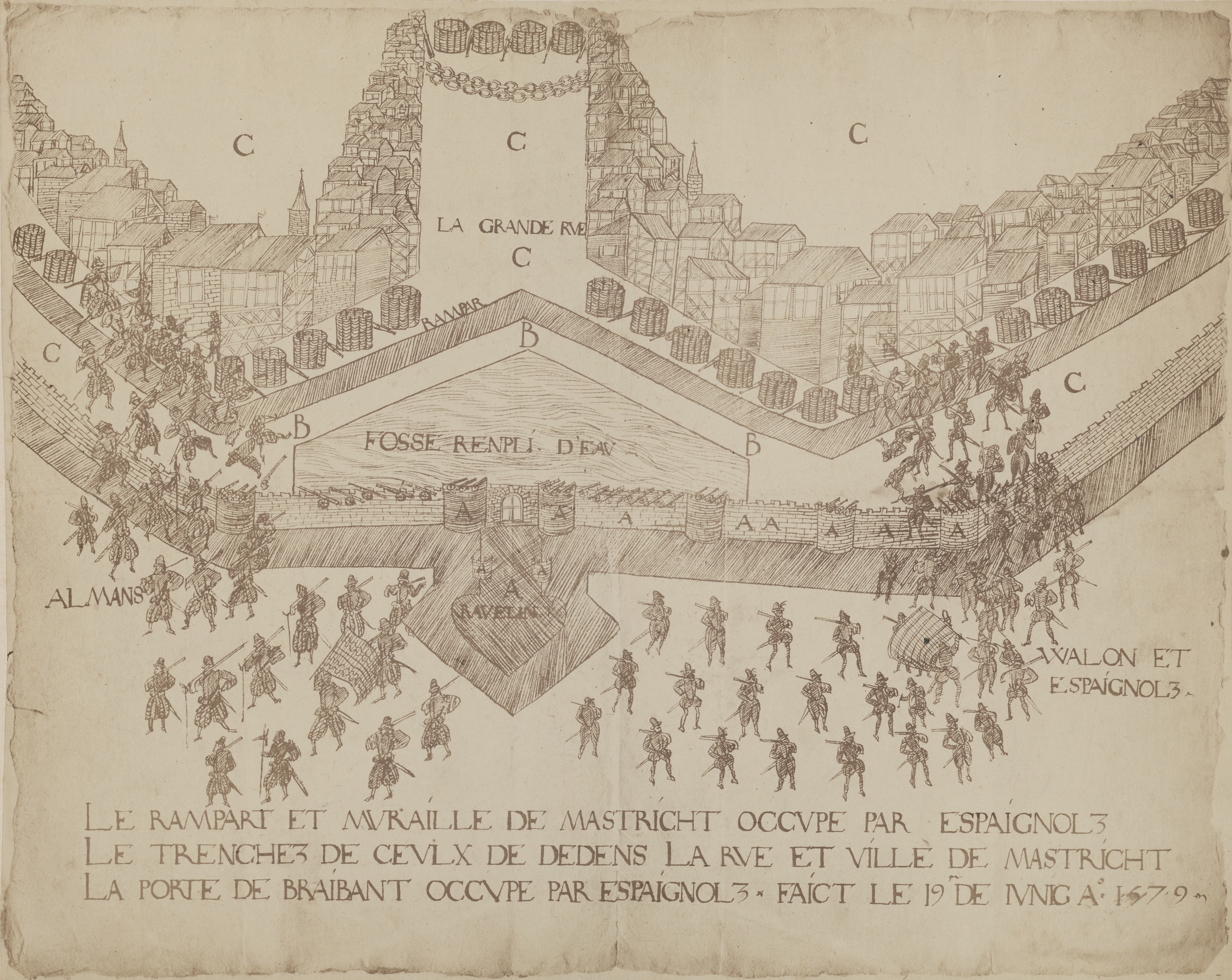
Sketch of the defenses around the Brussels gate by a German soldier of the garrison of Maastricht, drawn on 19 June 1579 and sent to the Landgrave of Hesse.

On 4 June, the Dutch sappers detonated two counter-mines below two Spanish mines, inflicting a number of casualties, including Captain Ortiz. Meanwhile, anticipating the loss of the Brussels gate, Tapin ordered a lunette to be built behind it. Thousands of civilians worked on the new fortification, which was quickly finished and furnished with eight cannons. By then, the number of able soldiers in command of Schwarzenberg and Tapin had fallen to just 400. According to a Dutch deserter, 1,000 defenders had been killed in the fighting. Farnese decided then to drag siege artillery to the section of the walls under Spanish control to batter the new lunette. While supervising the operation, Berlaymont was killed. His loss, according to Vázquez, was much deplored, 'for he was a brave gentleman, well-liked and much loved by all the nations'.

The Spanish artillery fire forced the Dutch to abandon their remaining positions in the Brussels gate and retreat behind the lunette. This was subjected to a heavy bombardment, and Tapin was wounded. To encourage his men and keep morale high, he ordered to be taken to the front in a litter. By 15 June, the number of Spanish cannons battering the lunette had increased to 14. Despite their high caliber of 40 pounds, they failed to breach the rampart. Farnese then ordered his sappers to gradually demolish the flanks of the lunette. By 24 June 1579, the rampart was almost reduced to rubble, notably its left flank, towards the Basilica of Saint Servatius. That day, the Spanish infantry assaulted the lunette, but was repelled with heavy losses in spite of Tapin briefly losing consciousness, having been hit by a stone. As the rampart was deemed defenseless, Tapin ordered a new entrenchment to be dug behind it. According to Famiano Strada 'there they [the Dutch soldiers and burghers] ate and slept, bringing the women their bread to them, remaining immobile on their positions'.

After the failed assault, Farnese fell ill and had to remain in bed. On 26 June 1579, he promised the besieged that the city would be spared if they surrendered. However, his terms were rejected, as the defenders did not trust him. Therefore, he determined that a final assault was to take place on 29 June, the feast of Saints Peter and Paul. The night before, while the deployment was being carried out, some Spanish and German soldiers unsuccessfully tried to storm the Dutch entrenchment, yet Farnese kept his orders. The Spanish infantry was placed on the right, and the German and Walloon soldiers on the left. During the night, several attacks were feigned in order to prevent the Dutch from resting.

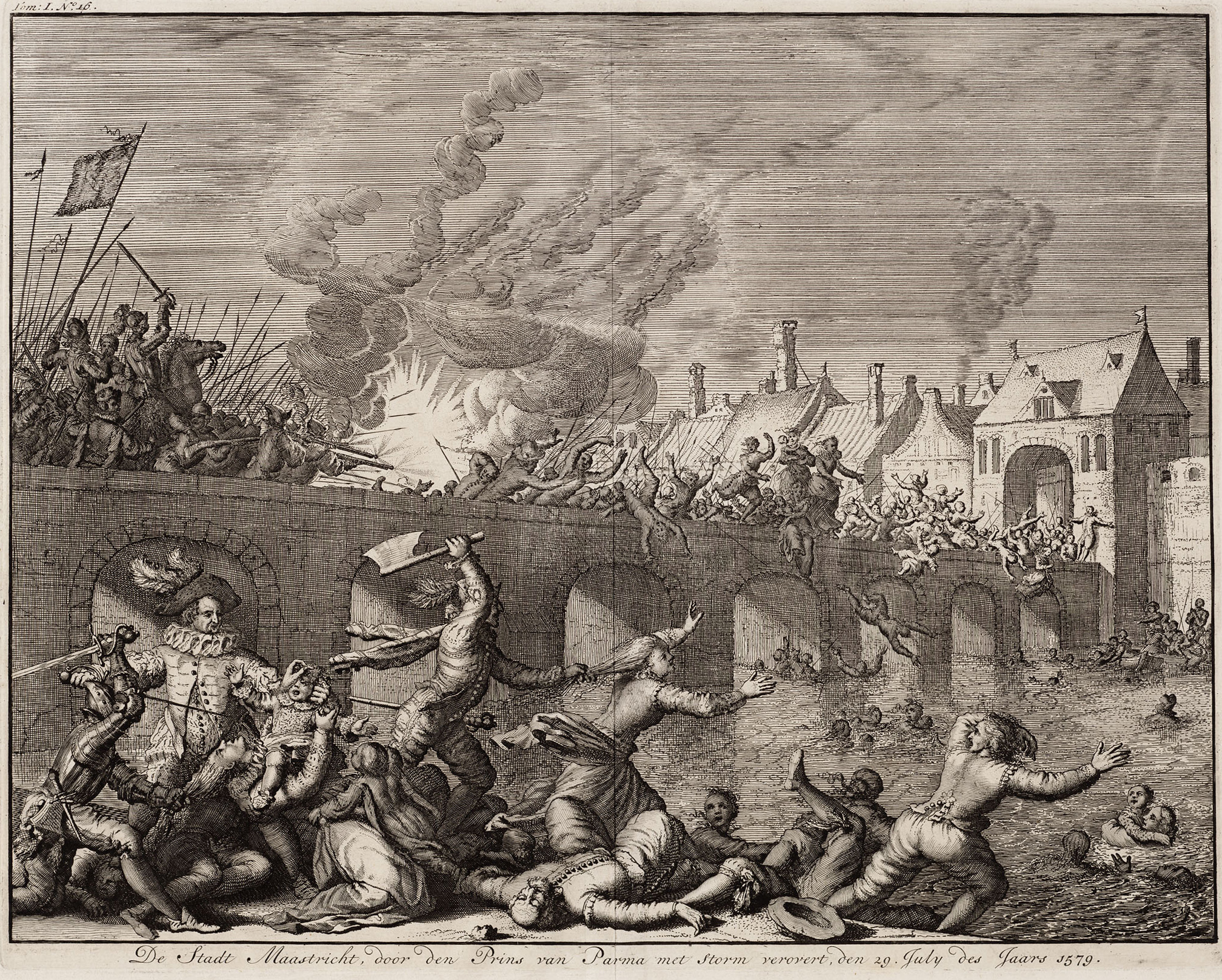
The Spanish Fury of Maastricht

At dawn, Maastricht was finally stormed. The defenders were then asleep and, taken by surprise, could not contain the push. Assailed from all sides, they broke ranks and fled, being chased and hunted down by the Spanish, German and Walloon soldiers along the streets. Many tried to hide in cellars and basements, but the Catholic troops searched house by house and put them to the sword. Soldiers and civilians alike died in the fight or drowned in the Meuse trying to escape. A last stand took place in the Vrijthof square, but ultimately the Spanish broke through and chased the soldiers and burghers along the bridge over the river to Wyck. Maastricht's wealthiest citizens, as well as the remaining soldiers, led by Tapin, saved themselves there by partially demolishing the bridge. 4,000 people were seized in the city and forced to pay a ransom while their homes were looted. It was said that the total booty amounted to more than 1 million golden ducats. The sack was particularly vicious as Farnese remained in bed and was unable to issue orders to contain the soldiery, and his two lieutenants, the Count of Mansfeld and Ottavio Gonzaga, disliked each other and refused to cooperate.

To put pressure over the last defenders, Mondragón launched an assault over Wyck, leading Tapin to realize that his position was hopeless. He requested terms to Gonzaga and surrendered on the condition he be spared with the surviving soldiers in exchange for a ransom. Schwarzenberg was slain during the battle, although it was rumored that he escaped in a boat disguised as a cook. By 1580, nevertheless, his states in Schinveld passed into the hands of a relative, dispelling any rumor about his survival. Captain Manzano was found hiding in a loft by a soldier called Alonso de Solís, and taken to Farnese. The Spanish infantry asked for Manzano to be handed over to them, which Farnese did. When asked how he preferred to die, Manzano answered that like a soldier, so he was passed through the pikes as a punishment 'for those who to live with freedom abandon the Spanish obedience and go with the heretics'. Most historians have promulgated the story that Tapin was spared and brought to Limbourg for medical treatment but exhaustion, coupled with his several wounds, took its toll, and he died some weeks later. However, what seems more likely is Tapin was found wounded in a room. Before this hero, Ottavio Gonzaga and the Spanish soldiers who had accompanied him felt neither any respect nor any pity: blinded by anger, they put him to death without any form of trial. When the Prince of Parma learned of this fact, he was profoundly indignant and violently reproached Gonzaga for it. He would have liked to save the life of the valiant defender of Maastricht but, immobilized by illness in his quarters and not knowing any more of what was going on in the city but what they wanted him to know, he could not prevent his heroic adversary from falling victim to the vengeance of the Spaniards. (Note: Vazquez, Campana, Strada, Motley, and Joly assert that Tapijn was made prisoner and led before the Prince of Parma, who granted him the life saved. He would soon have died in the service of the Emperor. We think we have to challenge their testimony. They are not eyewitnesses or immediate witnesses, while Paolo Rinaldi, the author of the unpublished manuscript Liber Relationum, is. He kept himself near the ill Farnese, in the tent where the latter was lying. However, his testimony is categorical: «Che venendo [Tapijn] in mano d'Ottavio Gonzaga et de Spagnoli, lo fecero morire malamente senza ordine et saputa di Parma, che cosi ho detto all' hora stava infermo, la qual cosa come seppe se ne risenti gagliardamente con Ottavio Gonzaga di questo…». Strada and Campana say that Farnese, after having saved Tapijn, had him brought to and shut up in Limbourg Castle. Isn't there contradiction here with the history of La Noue, for whom Tapijn was the lieutenant? This may be the origin of the legend.)

== Aftermath ==
The four months of siege and the sack of the city left Maastricht partially ruined. Contemporaneous Netherlandish authors such as Emanuel van Meteren and Pieter Bor noted that just 300 to 400 burghers remained after the capture of the city, which according to them had to be repopulated by people from Liège. Strada wrote that 8,000 inhabitants, including 1,700 women, died during the siege, while the Mémoires anonymes sur les troubles des Pays-bas reduces the figure to 4,000 dead. The number of deaths in the assault and sack was set by Christophe d'Assonville, member of the Privy Council, at 500 or 600, a number which Farnese rose to 900 to 1,000, and Protestant authors to 2,100 to 2,500. In 1865, a study by the Dutch historian Jozef Habets, who researched the baptismal records of the city's four parishes in the ten years after the siege, denied that Maastricht had been depopulated as a consequence of the city's capture, but that it quickly recovered its former prosperity after 1579. Habets argued that, of the 1,362 names listed in the 1581-1591 period, just four are of Spanish background and 61 of Walloon or French origins, the remaining being of Lower Dutch extraction. Later, in 1876, A. F. Haakman further dispelled the mass depopulation when concluded that in 1582 about 5,880 people lived in two of the four Maastrich parishes, for a total estimated population of more than 13,000 people. Besides the casualties during the siege, Haakman attributes the decrease in population to the diseases and to the flight of many of the city's wealthiest inhabitants. He also noted that the schepen, the guild masters and the administrators of the charities were essentially the same before and after the siege, and that the bakers, brewers, wine merchants and butchers were allowed to continue their jobs unmolested.

The Spanish casualties were high. According to Alonso Vázquez, more than 1,500 Spanish soldiers died in the combats, including 23 captains and three sergeant majors. 22 German and Walloon captains were killed, for a total loss, excluding the pioneers, of about 2,500 soldiers. Farnese dispatched Cristóbal de Mondragón to Spain to inform Philip II about the success, and wrote letters to the pope Gregory XIII and to his parents, Ottavio Farnese and Margaret of Parma – half-sister of Philip II and former governess of the Netherlands. However, his illness quickly worsened, and he was even given the last rites, though he eventually recovered and, on 28 July 1579, the army was put in formation and fired many salvos to celebrate his comeback. According to Vázquez, 'it was a feast never seen [...] as there were light horsemen who dressed overcoats worth 400 scudi'. That day he finally entered Maastricht across the main breach. There, 24 generals and senior officers waited him, aiming at covering him with the canopy of the Basilic of Saint Servatius as a sign of victory. However, Farnese instructed them to return the canopy to its place. He lodged at the Deanery of Saint Servatius and stayed in Maastricht for eight months, until March 1580, when he went again on campaign. During this period, he commissioned the creation of a new bust of Saint Servatius to replace the old one, which had been lost during the looting. His coat of arms adorns the bust.

=== Military and political developments ===
While the siege of Maastricht and the Cologne peace talks were being undertaken, Farnese was also negotiating with the Walloon States of Artois, Hainaut and the Walloon Flanders, which agreed to submit to Philip II by the Treaty of Arras on 17 May 1579. At Mechelen, growing tensions between the Catholics, on one side, and the Calvinists on the other, supported by troops from Holland, led to an armed struggle on 29 May which ended with the victory of the Catholics, who immediately pledged allegiance to the king. The Catholic successes at Maastricht and Mechelen further shattered the unity of the rebel provinces, as intended by Farnese, leading to Catholic revolts against the Calvinist magistracies in Bruges and 's-Hertogenbosch, though just this one was successful. At Groningen, which had not joined the Union of Utrecht, a Calvinist insurrection was put down, and the city declared for the king on 5 March 1580, followed by other towns in the surrounding Ommelanden region. Emboldened by the capture of Maastricht, as well as by Cardinal Granvelle's assertion that more towns will soon defect the rebels, Philip II instructed his delegates in Cologne to demand the restoration of exclusive Catholic worship in all the Low Countries, and fewer checks to his royal authority. Ultimately, the talks failed, and in March 1580 Philip outlawed William of Orange, who responded with his Apology, paving the way to the recognition of Francis of Anjou as 'prince and lord of the Netherlands' by the States General in January 1581 and the Act of Abjuration that July, which marked the de facto independence of the Dutch Republic from the Spanish Crown.

== Legacy ==
As a major victory for Philip II, the Siege of Maastricht was depicted in paintings, engravings and plays. The siege features prominently in two series of paintings about battles and sieges of the Eighty Years' War commissioned in the late 1590s by Archduke Albert, governor from the Spanish Netherlands, to commemorate military victories that highlighted the reputation of the Spanish Crown, and intended as a present to Philip II. When the canvases arrived to Spain, Philip had already died, but they were kept at the Palace of El Escorial. The two series differ in the size, being the large one 204 x 245 cm and the smaller one 119 x 169 cm, and in the presence in the latter of explanatory legends. The two paintings are similar in composition, both showing the assault over Maastricht from the west, and were probably inspired by an engraving of Frans Hogenberg. In the smaller painting, Farnese, the Count of Mansfeld and Gilles de Berlaymont are identified. These canvases were sent to the Palace of El Pardo to replace artworks lost in a 1604 fire, and stayed there until 1634–1635, when the Count-Duke Olivares, valido of Philip IV, ordered them to be sent to the newly built Buen Retiro Palace, intended to be a new symbol of the power of the Spanish Monarchy.

The first artworks to depict the siege were two engravings by Frans Hogenberg which were published shortly thereafter. One focuses on the siege, and the other portrays the sack of the city, chiefly the escape of the townsfolk across the bridge over the Meuse and the Spanish violence. Hogenberg, a Protestant based in Cologne, depicted many sacks by the Army of Flanders, but none by the Dutch rebels. Hogenberg's visual reports were directed to politically interested contemporaries and appealed to the feeling of the beholder, thereby fostering support for the Dutch Revolt.

A century later, the Dutch Anabaptist artist Jan Luyken, one of the most productive and influential printmakers of the late 17th century in the Dutch Republic, produced an engraving about the siege for a 1679–1684 edition of Pieter Bor's chronicle Oorsprongk, begin, en vervolgh der Nederlandsche oorlogen, published with support of the authorities of the provinces of Holland and Utrecht. Luyken's engraving focuses in the Spanish sack, which is depicted in an explicit and violent way characterized by the use of a close perspective and a condensation of the violence. At the same time, one engraving about the siege was produced by Romeyn de Hooghe for the Spanish edition of Famiano Strada's De Bello Belgico, published in Cologne in 1681. Though Hooghe was Dutch and known for his anti-Catholic engravings, he was approached by the Spanish military engineer Juan de Ledesma to design the illustrations of Strada's work, which celebrates Farnese and his military feats. Therefore, Hooghe's engraving depicts the capture of the city focusing in spectacular hand-to-hand combats and the intricacies of the siege.

A series of paintings depicting the campaigns of Alexander Farnese, based on Hooghe's engravings for De Bello Belgico, was created in the early 18th century by the Cuzco School of the Viceroyalty of Peru, during the reign of Philip V. They were meant to foster a sense of continuity at a moment when the Habsburg dynasty had been replaced in Spain by the Bourbon one, which was linked to the House of Farnese through the second wife of Philip V, Elisabeth Farnese, direct descendant of Alexander. Other paintings about Farnese's campaigns, inspired by this series, were produced in the 18th century Spanish Americas, including several ones belonging to the collection of the Casa de la Moneda in Potosí. One of the canvases, measuring 97 x 155 cm, portrays the siege of Maastricht. Much like in Hooghe's engraving, Farnese is seated in a chair, covered by a parasol, while the Spanish troops assault the city and a mine explodes on the left.
