= Battle of Rijmenam =

1578 battle

- Part of the Eighty Years' War
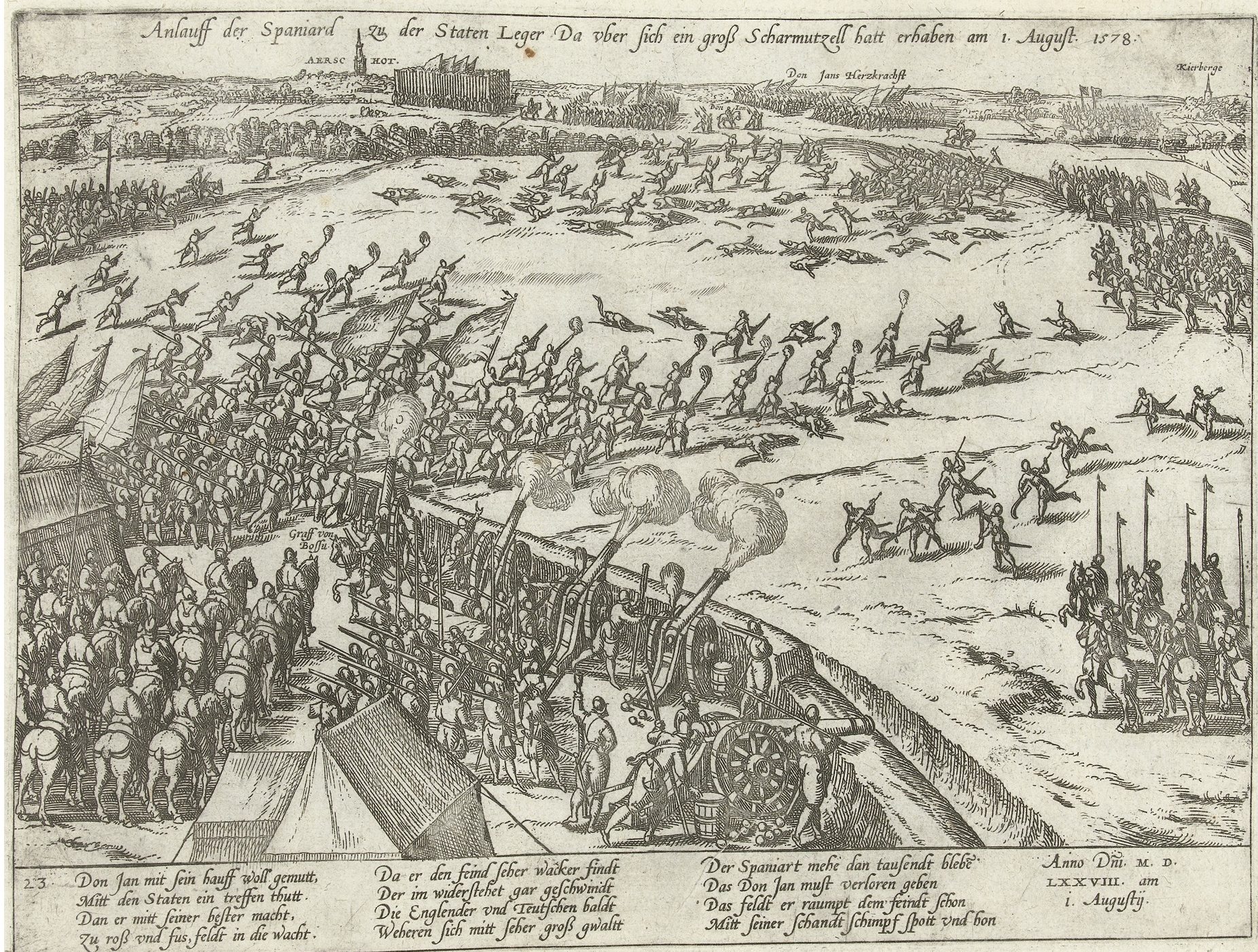
- Spanish attack on the States army, by Frans Hogenberg.
Date	31 July 1578
Location	Rijmenam (present-day Belgium)
Result	States-General victory

Belligerents
(Dutch Republic) States-General	Spain

Commanders and leaders
(Dutch Republic) Count of Boussu (Dutch Republic) John Norreys (Dutch Republic) François de la Noue	(Spain) Juan de Austria

Strength
18,000 infantry 2,000 cavalry	12,000 infantry 5,000 cavalry

Casualties and losses
400+ dead or wounded	Between 400 and 1,000 dead or wounded

The Battle of Rijmenam was fought in the early stages of the Eighty Years' War between the forces of the States-General of the Netherlands and those of the Spanish Governor-General of the Habsburg Netherlands, Don Juan de Austria, on 31 July 1578, near Rijmenam in present-day Belgium. The Spanish forces were dealt a strategic defeat.

== Background ==
After the Pacification of Ghent the entire Habsburg Netherlands had risen against Philip II of Spain. When the new Governor-General, Philip's half-brother Don Juan, arrived in the country in November 1576, he initially feigned readiness to cooperate with the States-General, but soon there was a rupture, and the war was resumed. From January 1578 on, the reinforcements that were sent to Don Juan by way of the Spanish Road had made him strong enough to go on the offensive. Almost immediately, he gained a stunning victory in the Battle of Gembloux. This motivated foreign powers to intervene on behalf of the States-General. Queen Elizabeth of England sent money and troops, as did the Duke of Anjou. These reinforcements formed the backbone of a reconstituted States Army that took up formation in a reinforced encampment at Rijmenam during July 1578. The nominal commander of this force was the Count of Boussu. It consisted mainly of English mercenaries under Sir John Norris and Sir Richard Bingham, Scottish mercenaries under Robert Stuart, and French Huguenots under François de la Noue. On the eve of the battle it was waiting for further reinforcements from the Count Palatine, who was waiting near Zutphen for the arrival of a subsidy that Queen Elizabeth had promised, but not yet paid. Without those considerable reinforcements it counted about 18,000-foot and 2,000 horse.

Don Juan, on the other hand, could free no more than 12,000-foot and 5,000 horse. This inferiority of forces motivated him to seek battle before the forces of the Count Palatine could unite with those of the army at Rijmenam. However, during a council of war before the battle his second-in-command, the Duke of Parma and the experienced commander Gabrio Serbelloni opposed the plan as they thought the risk too great. Nevertheless, Don Juan decided to attack.

== Battle ==
After having spent the night opposite the enemy, Don Juan's army attacked early in the morning of 31 July 1578. The States Army was drawn up in front of the village of Rijmenam, with its flanks anchored in forests on both sides. In front of the army a system of entrenchments had been dug. Don Juan approached these trenches in the hope that Boussu would come out and engage him in the open, but Boussu refused to be drawn. After a wait of three hours, Don Juan ordered a company of musketeers under Alonso de Leyva and three troops of cuirassiers under the Marquis del Monte, to make a feint to the rear of the village on the Spanish left wing. This time Boussu took the bait and ordered Norris to head him off. A skirmish ensued but neither Norris, nor Leyva followed through

However, a few English soldiers had become lost between the lines and this drew in reinforcements from both sides. Both the Scots under Stuart and Spanish infantry under Fernando de Toledo came forward. At the same time the entire Spanish infantry started an advance on the trenches, led by Parma who went ahead on foot, pike in hand. Meanwhile, Toledo pushed Norris back inside the village. Norris directly counterattacked after having set fire to a few houses in the village. This was misinterpreted by the Spanish commanders as an attempt by Boussu to burn his baggage train. Thinking that the States Army was retreating, they now pressed the attack, despite attempts from Don Juan and Parma to stop them. When Leyva and Toledo had reached the center of the village, they discovered they had been lured into a well-laid trap.

It now turned out that the apparent deployment of the States Army in front of the village had been a ruse to draw the Spaniards in. In reality, the reinforced camp of Boussu was located behind the village and his artillery was drawn up in front of the real line. Five hundred Spanish musketeers and six hundred cavalry now found themselves in very perilous circumstances. The Scottish soldiers stripped to the waist, while singing psalms, and attacked the astounded Spaniards. At the same time the States's artillery opened fire. The Spanish troops were in danger of being annihilated. However, Parma personally extricated them by way of a covered path through the village, while executing one of his famous cavalry manoeuvres. This ended the battle, as Boussu did not follow through.

As usual, the reports of casualties differ. According to Dutch historians a loss of 1,000 dead was suffered by the Spanish forces. On the Spanish side no more than 400 dead are admitted and the same number on the other side claimed. Spanish historians admit to more wounded and prisoners lost, however.

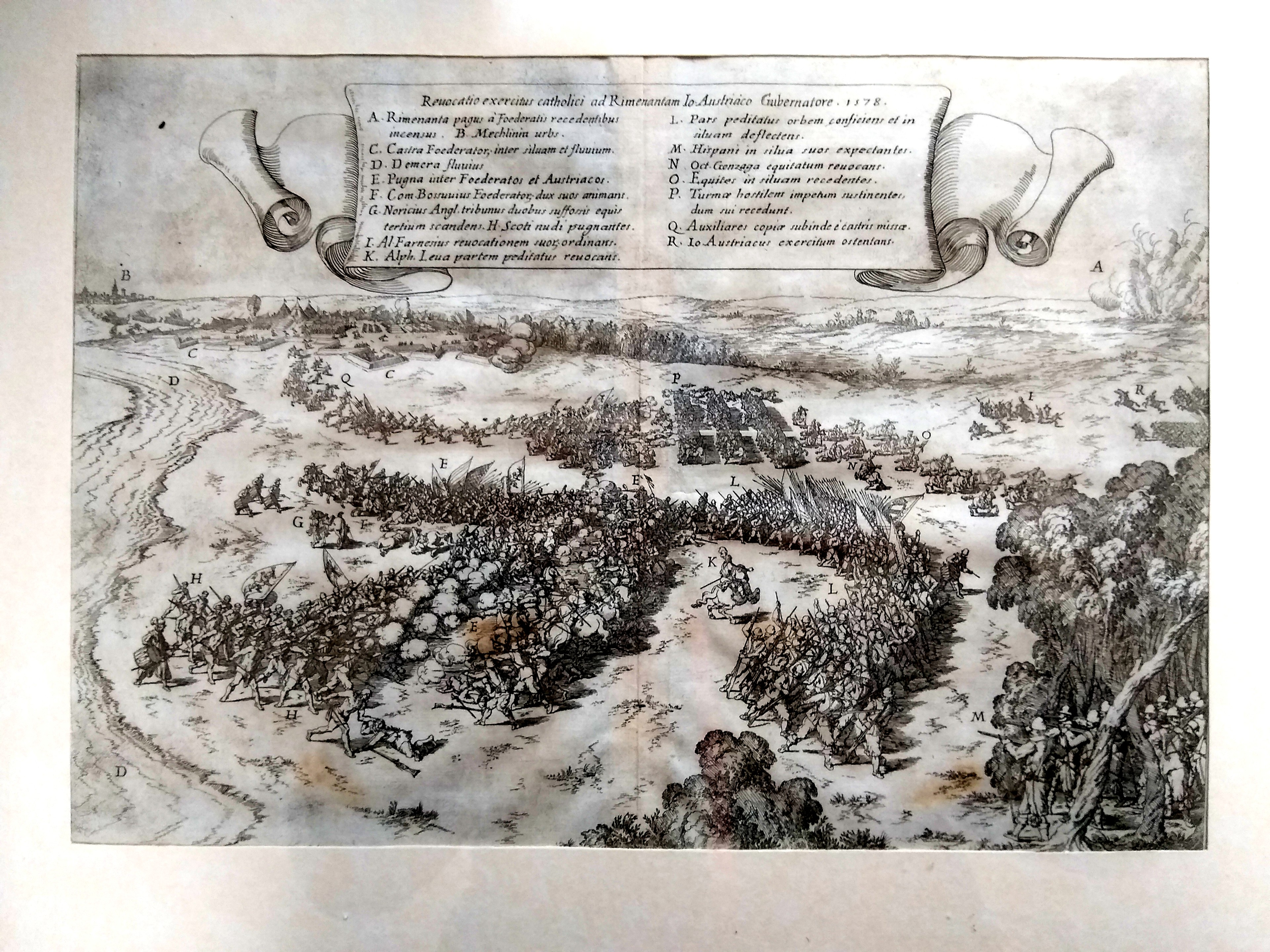
Alonso de Leyva attacks Rijmenam by Johann Wilhelm Baur

== Aftermath ==
After the battle Don Juan first withdrew to Tienen, but soon had to retreat to Namur. He thus relinquished most of the territorial gains after Gembloux. While encamped near Namur he died from a sudden illness (probably typhus) on 1 October 1578.

== Sources ==
- Butler, A.J. (ed.) (1903) "Preface", Calendar of State Papers Foreign, Elizabeth, Volume 13: 1578–1579, pp. V-LX
- (in French) Namèche, A.J. (1886) Le règne de Philippe II et la lutte religieuse dans les Pays-Bas au XVIe siècle, Vols. 5–6, C. Fonteyn, pp. 346–353
- Marek y Villarino de Brugge, André (2020a). Alessandro Farnese: Prince of Parma: Governor-General of the Netherlands (1545–1592): v. I. Los Angeles: MJV Enterprises ltd. inc. ISBN 979-8687255998.
