= Rijmenam =

Village in Flemish Region, Belgium

- Village
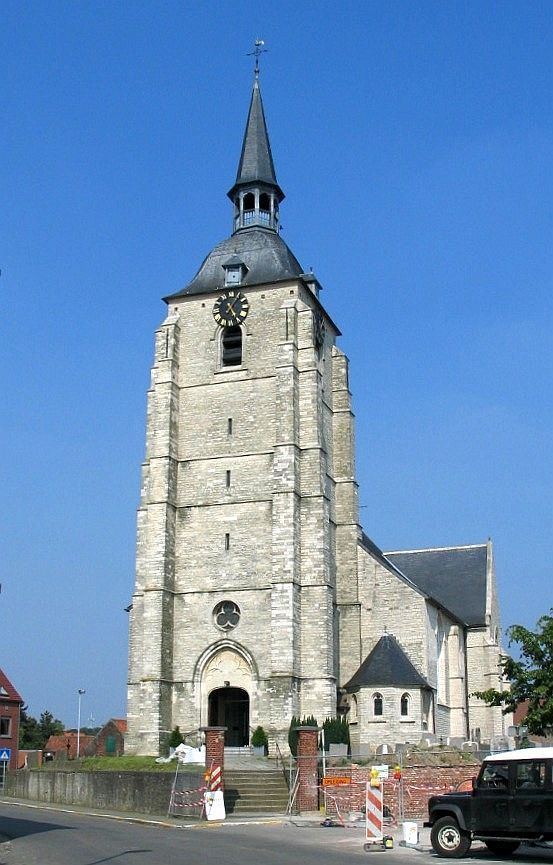
- Saint-Martinus Church at Rijmenam

- Location in Belgium
- Coordinates: 51.002°N 4.586°E
- Country: Belgium
- Region: Flemish Region
- Province: Antwerp
- Municipality: Bonheiden

Area
  - Total: 15.35 km^{2} (5.93 sq mi)

Population (2021)
  - Total: 5,809
  - Density: 378.4/km^{2} (980.1/sq mi)
- Time zone: CET

Rijmenam is a village located in the Belgian province of Antwerp and is part of the municipality of Bonheiden.

== History ==
The area around Rijmenam has been settled since the Roman era. A chapel is known to have existed since the 11th century. Rijmenam used to belong to the Duchy of Brabant. In 1578, the Dutch States Army and Spanish forces fought the Battle of Rijmenam over control of Mechelen. The village was almost completely destroyed, and rebuilt twenty years later. Rijmenam used to be an agricultural community, but it became a residential area during the 20th century.

Rijmenam has a triangle-shaped open space with tilia trees, which was used for trials by the Franks.

Rijmenam used to be an independent municipality. In 1977, it was merged into Bonheiden except for the hamlet Peulis which became part of Putte.

== Gallery ==
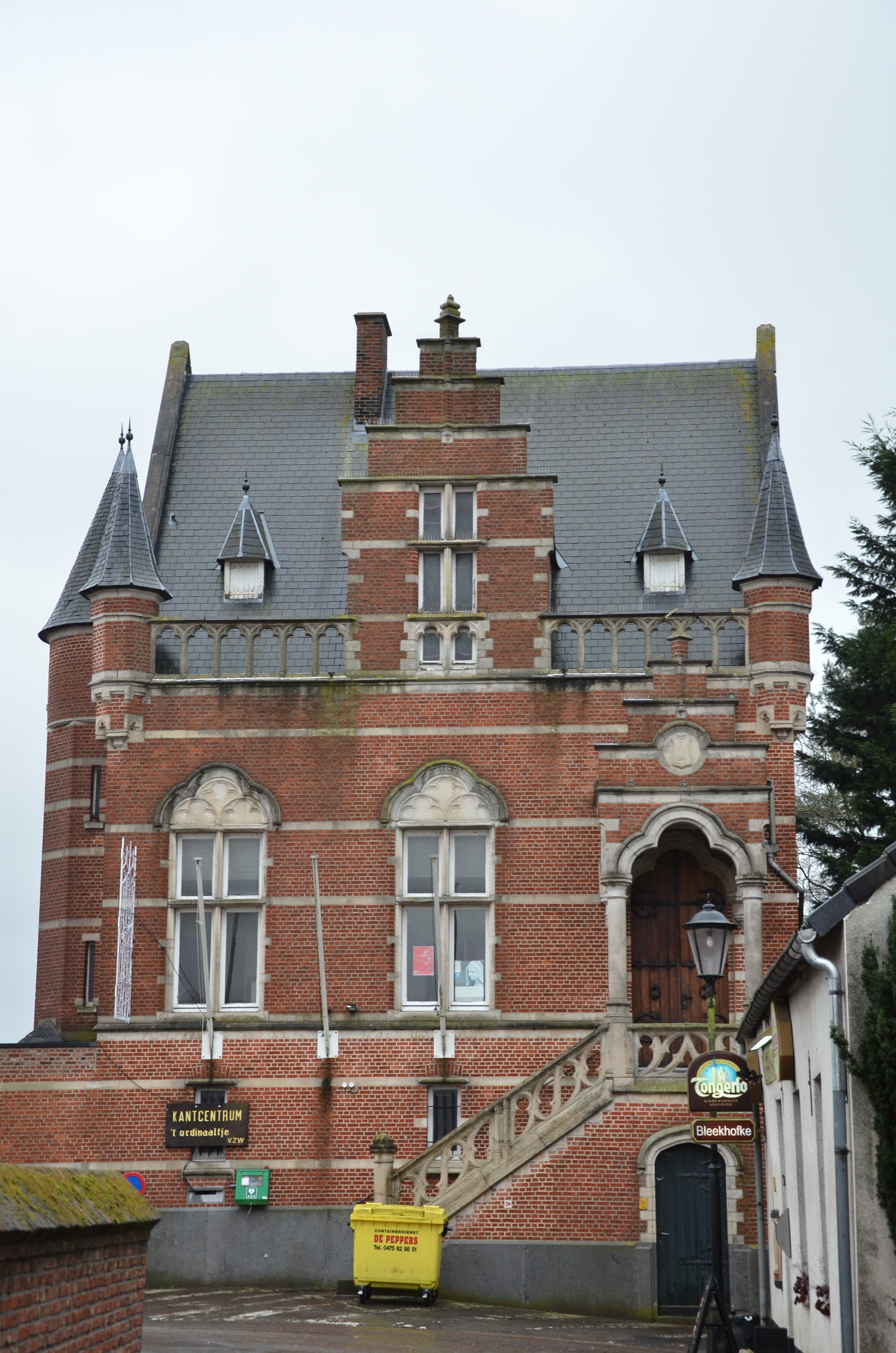
Former town hall

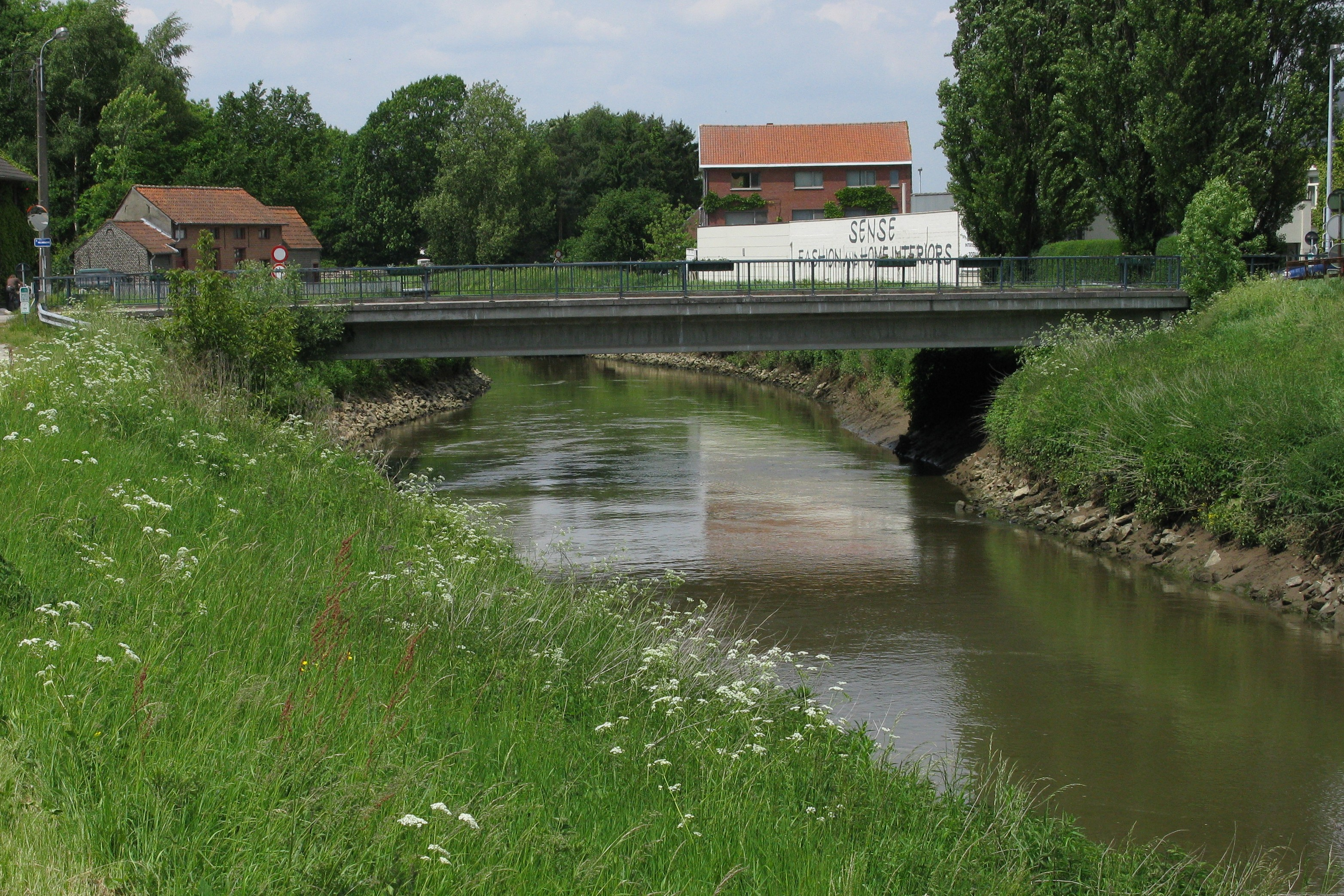
Bridge at Rijmenam

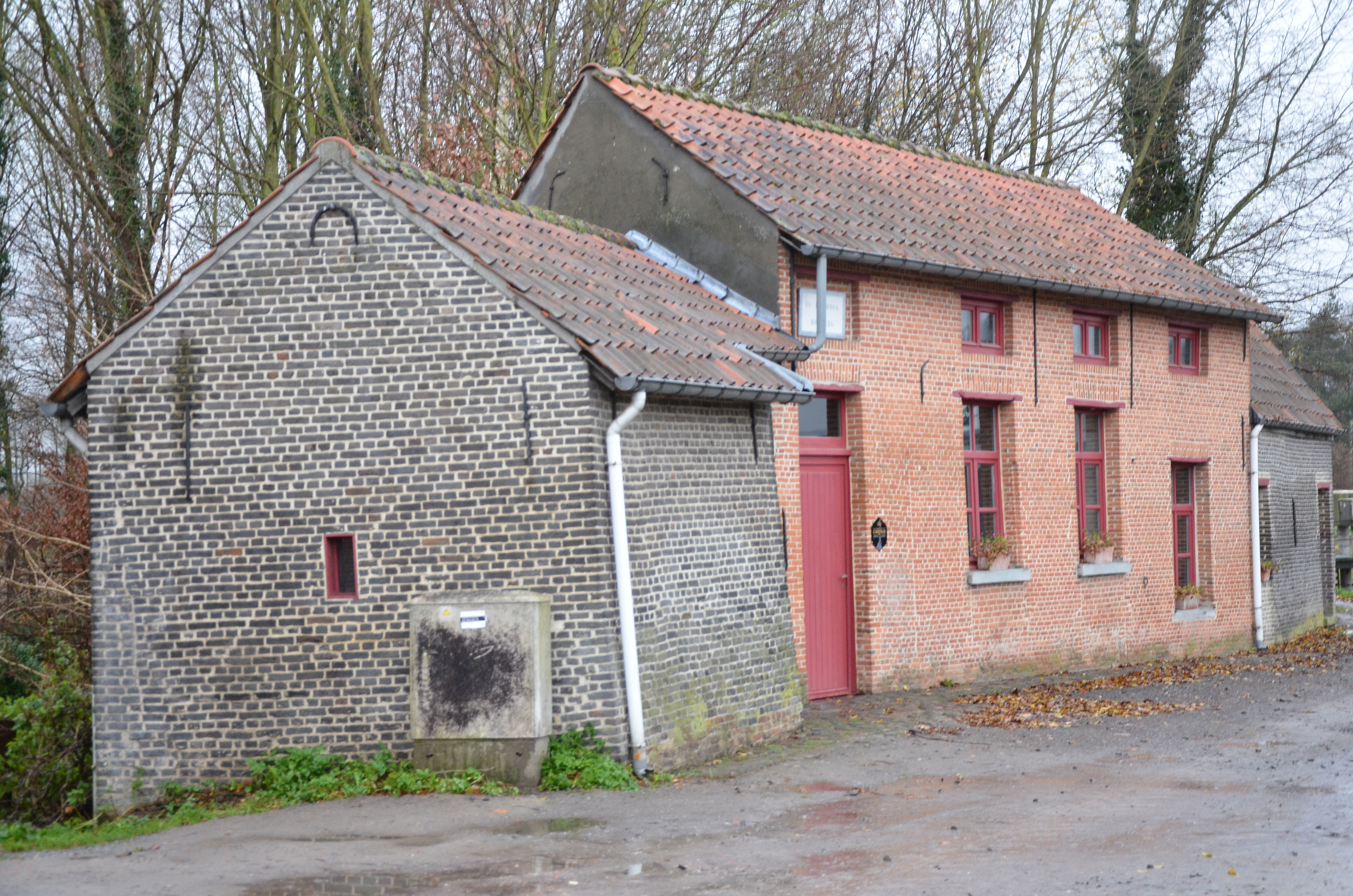
Houses on the dike

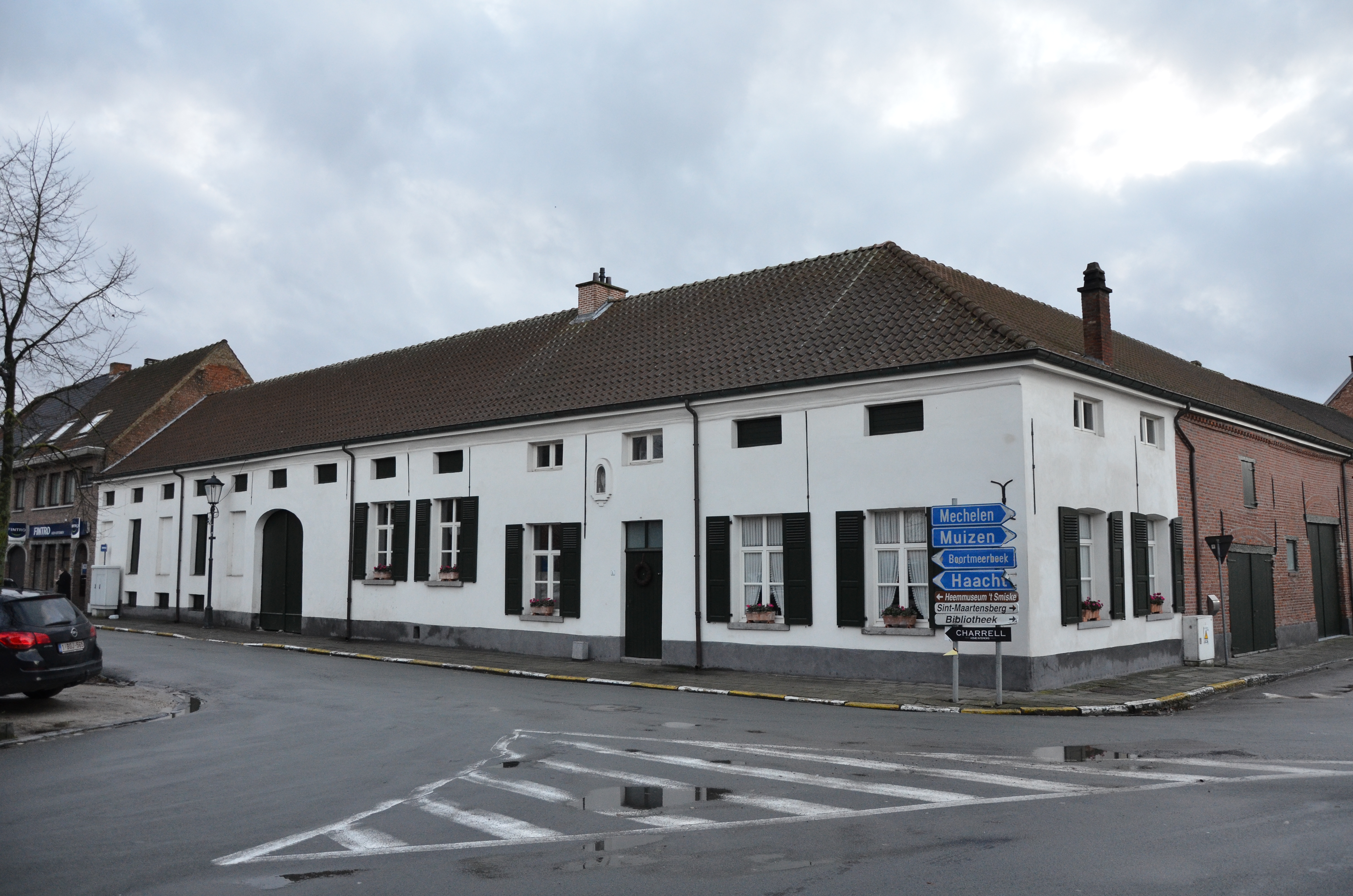
Building in Rijmenam
