= Gabrio Serbelloni =

Italian condottiero and general

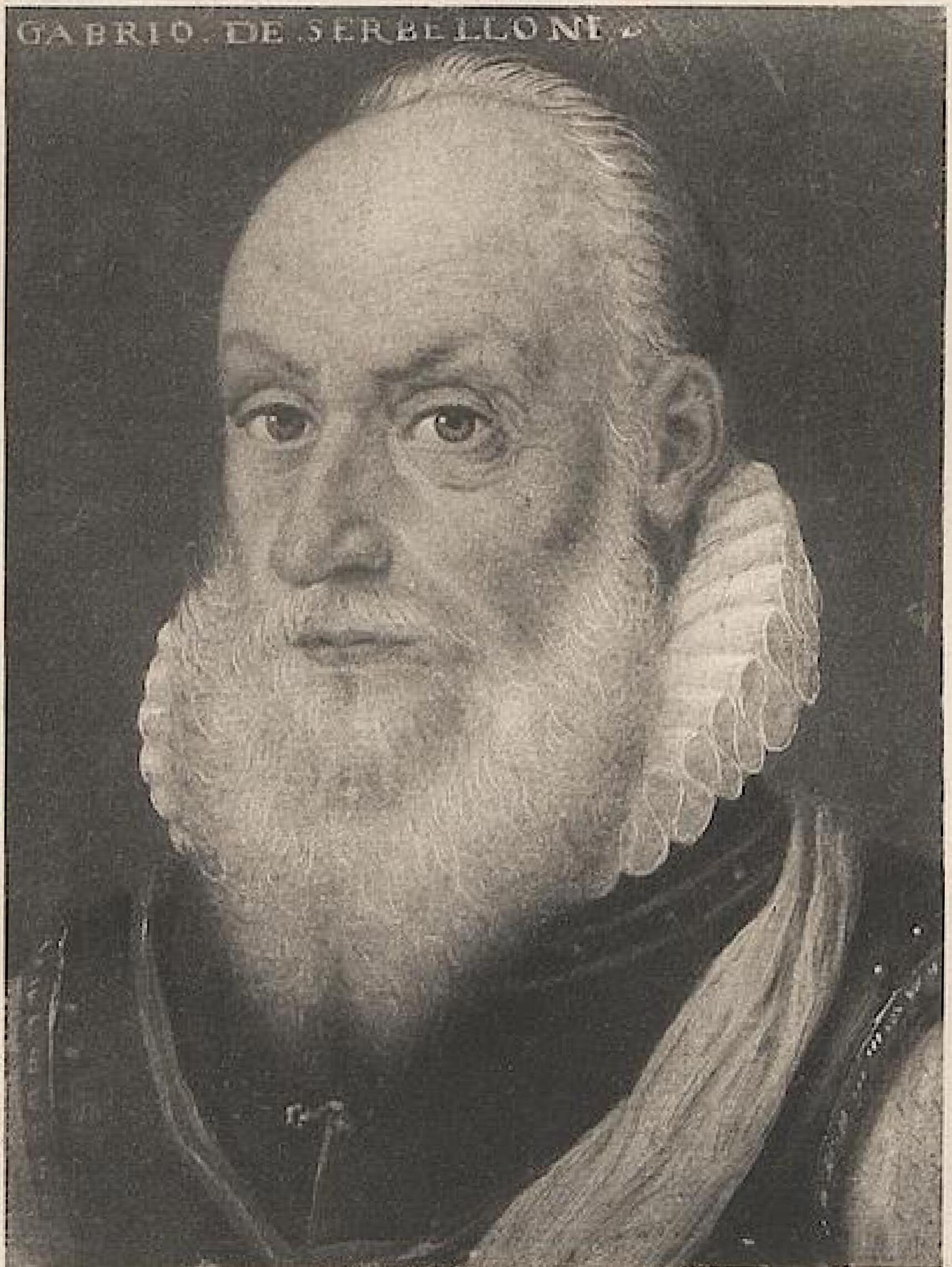
- Born: 1508; Milan, Duchy of Milan
- Died: 1580 (aged 71–72); Milan, Duchy of Milan
- Military career
- Allegiance: Spain
- Rank: Condottieri; General
- Conflicts: Italian War of 1542–46; Italian War of 1551–59; Dutch Revolt

Gabriele Serbelloni, better known as Gabrio Serbelloni (also Gabriel Cerbellón in Spanish), (1509 – January 1580) was an Italian condottiero and general. A noble by birth (his family was among the noblest in Milan), he achieved an even higher status through his military accomplishments as well as his family connections. He defended Asti against the French in 1551 and was made governor of Saluzzo after conquering the town. He was made Captain General of the Papal Guard in 1559 when one of his cousins was elected pope. Later he entered the service of Philip II of Spain, joined the Knights of Malta and received the title Prior of Hungary. He took part in the suppression of the Dutch Revolt in 1567 and captured Tunis in 1573. He was humiliated when the town was besieged and captured by Ottoman forces. He was later released in a prisoner of war exchange and eventually died in Milan.

== Military career ==
As a lieutenant to his cousin, the condottiero Gian Giacomo Medici (known as Medeghino), in the fall of 1531, Serbelloni fought against the Sforza militias and the imperial forces of Charles V, who later became his lord and employer. A few weeks later, he took part in the defence of Lecco together with Niccolò Pelliccione. Later on still he followed his cousin into exile in Piedmont, in the service of the Duke of Savoy. At the end of 1536, he was imprisoned along with Medeghino in the Castello Sforzesco of Milan as he was suspected of being an accomplice to the rebel Lodovico da Birago. After that he offered his services to the Holy Roman Empire and fought in Hungary. With 300 infantrymen at his command, in 1542 Serbelloni distinguished himself against the Ottoman Turks in the defence of Esztergom. Four years later he rejoined his cousin Gian Giacomo Medici to fight against the Protestant coalition in Germany; he was now a general in the artillery corps fighting against the Duke of Saxony.

== Defending Asti ==
In 1551, still with 300 men on foot, Serbelloni was sent by Ferrante Gonzaga to defend Asti against the French; he conquered the town of Saluzzo and was appointed as its governor. Always with his fierce cousin, he commanded the Florentine artillery in the war for Siena in 1554; the next summer he assaulted and overcame Porto Ercole fortress after a four-day artillery barrage, then with 700 German Landsknechts he defended Populonia against a Turkish sea-borne assault, receiving support from the Florentine cavalry.

== Papal Guard ==
After serving as overseer of the fortresses for Duke Cosimo II de' Medici, Serbelloni's career was advanced when another of his cousins was elected Pope as Pius IV. In 1559 he was made Captain General of the Papal Guard, Governor of Borgo and overseer for all the fortresses of the Apostolic See; he was especially active in rebuilding Civitavecchia, touring the whole of the Papal States in his duty. After the Pope's death, he entered the service of Philip II of Spain, who employed him in the same capacity in the Spanish-held Kingdom of Naples. Serbelloni entered the ranks of Knights of Malta, sending troops to help break the Turkish siege and organizing naval raids against the Muslims. After receiving the title of Prior of Hungary, Serbelloni oversaw the reconstruction of the Maltese fortifications damaged or destroyed under the Turkish assault, and acted as middle-man between Jean de la Vallette, his order's Grand Master, and the viceroy of Sicily, don Garcia de Toledo.

== Dutch Revolt ==
In 1567, Serbelloni followed the Spanish armies into Belgium under the Duke of Alva during the repression of the Dutch Revolt, being appointed twice as governor of Antwerp. He took part in the Battle of Lepanto (1571) and, two years later, he captured Tunis. The following year Ottoman forces under the command of Sinan Pasha besieged and eventually took Tunis; Serbelloni was humiliated, dragged by his beard to the conqueror to ask for mercy on his knees, and many of his surviving men were slain. He had then to physically work to restore the fortifications. Brought in Constantinople as an important prisoner, he was ransomed in 1575 by the Venetian ambassador Antonio Tiepolo under a prisoner of war exchange. He was thus able to return to Milan through Ragusa and Naples. His last military campaign was against the Flemish and Dutch rebels: he took part in the Spanish capture of Maastricht in 1579.

== Death ==
He died at the age of seventy in his native Milan in January, 1580.
