= Siege of Lochem (1582) =

1582 siege

- Part of the Eighty Years' War
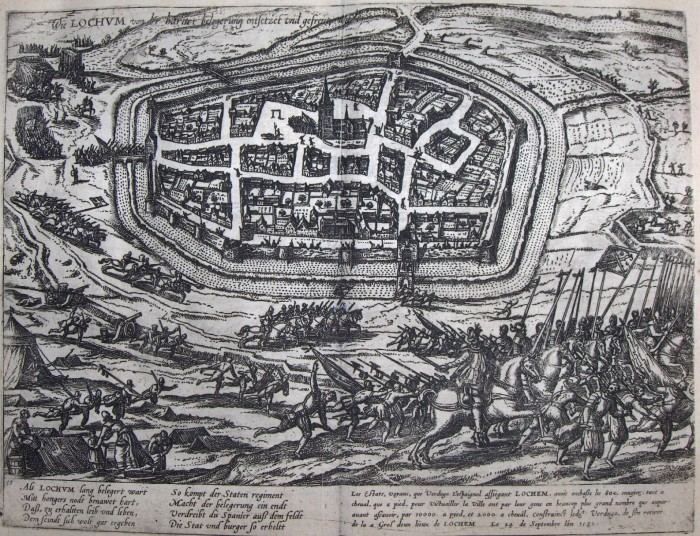
- Liberation of Lochem from the Spanish in 1582. Etching by Frans Hogenberg
Date	22 July to 15 September 1582
Location	Lochem (present-day the Netherlands)
Result	States-General victory

Belligerents
(Dutch Republic) States-General	Spain

Commanders and leaders
(Dutch Republic) Count of Hohenlohe (Dutch Republic) John Norreys	(Spain) Francisco Verdugo (Spain) Juan Baptista de Taxis

Strength
5,000 soldiers 2,500 cavalry	4,000 soldiers 400 cavalry

Casualties and losses
Low	High

The siege of Lochem also known as the Relief of Lochem was a siege that took place in the Dutch city of Lochem during the Eighty Years' War. The city was relieved by a States army under Count Philip of Hohenlohe-Neuenstein and William Louis of Nassau-Dillenburg and John Norreys on September 24, 1582. This marked the end of the Spanish siege of the city by the Spanish general Francisco Verdugo.

== Background ==
In the summer of 1581 Francisco Verdugo had been sent by the Duke of Parma to replace the Count of Rennenberg after his defeat by Anglo Dutch forces under John Norreys at Kollum. Verdugo was able to defeat Norreys at Noordhorn his attempt to seize Niezijl was foiled by stout resistance, mutiny, and bad weather in the autumn of 1581. The following year Verdugo instead turned his attention to Lochem, a city in Guelderland, where Johann Baptista von Taxis had built a sconce around the walls of the town. Taxis joined forces with the Baron van Anholt, Lieutenant-colonel of former Rennenberg's regiment of foot, and laid siege to the town, believing it would be easy to capture as it was short of food. Verdugo had not given orders to start the siege and deemed it too risky because Lochem was easy to relieve. Nevertheless, after Anholt brought to Groningen news of the siege, he decided to take command of the operations in order to keep his good reputation as a commander. Moreover, with Lochem taken Verdugo would then have an easy chance to advance and take the cities of Zutphen and Deventer.

== Siege ==
By July 22 Lochem was under siege by 4,000 Spanish troops and 400 cavalry. In Lochem itself after a month of siege they had managed to hold out but conditions inside the town were appalling. Starvation took hold and many citizens had resorted to eating their own horses. The weather had been poor and the countryside was flooded; hampering conditions for both besieged and besieger.

Philip Hohenlohe had sent some Frisian companies on an offensive in the northern provinces, hoping to lure the Spanish commander Verdugo away from Lochem, but this failed. Hohenlohe then organised a relief force whilst in Deventer in late August. He gathered an army of 2,500 infantry and 1,500 cavalry which included fourteen companies of English and Scots troops (three companies were cavalry) under John Norreys. Hohenlohe had with him four heavy pieces of artillery and was expected to join up with more forces on his way.

On September 21, 1582, they left Deventer and joined with the army of William Louis, Count of Nassau-Dillenburg between Zutphen and the Castle Van Dorth. The size of the army grew to 5,000 soldiers and 2,500 cavalry including 1,800 newly arrived French Huguenot soldiers. This force also carried large quantities of food and supplies to meet the hungry population of Lochem.

=== Relief and aftermath ===
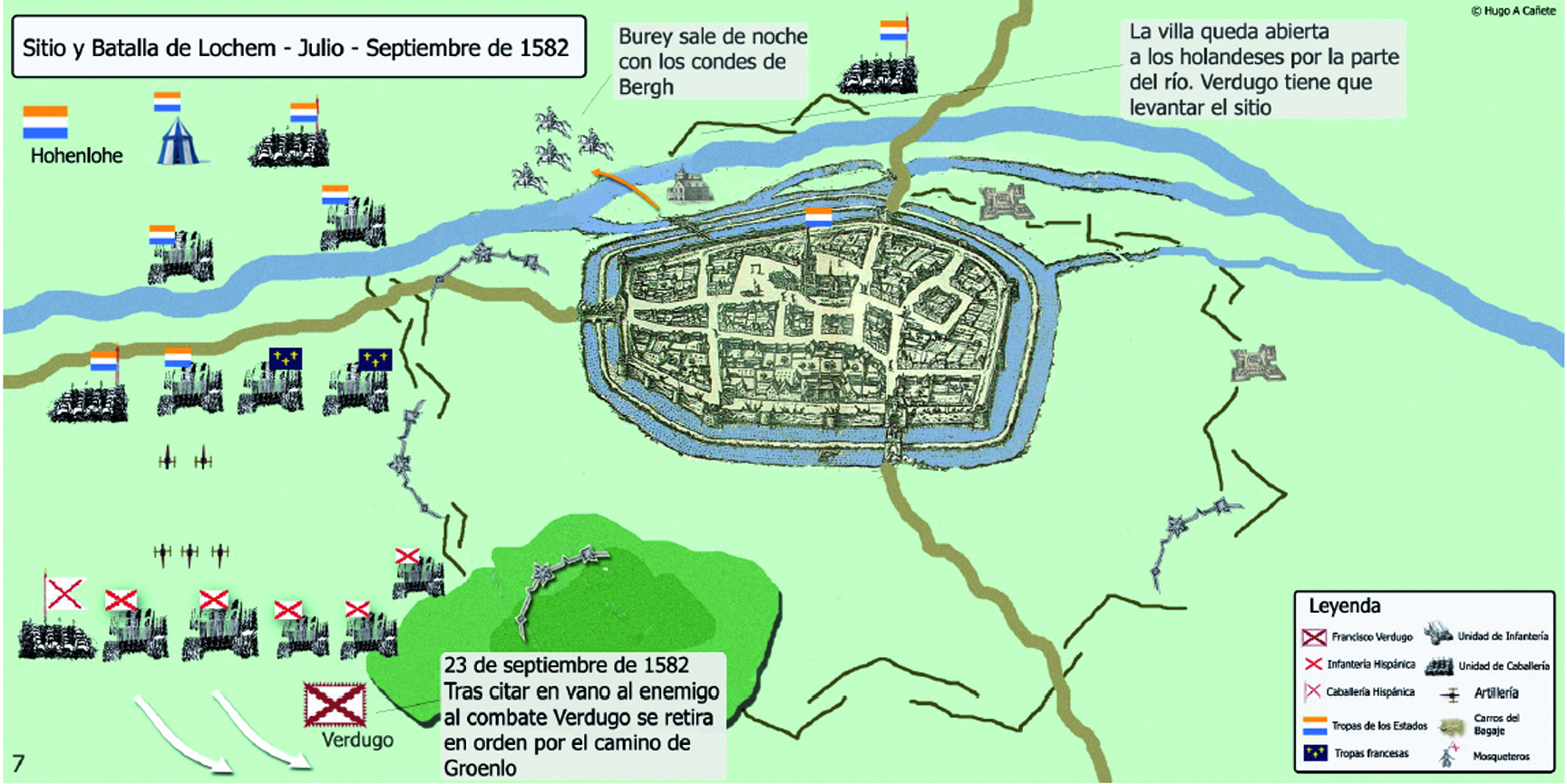
Final stages of the siege of Lochem.

On sighting the relief army from nearby Wildenborch castle the Spanish seeing they were outnumbered there decided to retreat. The allied force immediately occupied the castle, constructed a sconce and then built a bridge over the moat. The rising waters of the small river Brekel caused by mills in Zutphen stopping the water meant that for Verdugo it was now impossible to prevent the city from being resupplied. In the night Hohenlohe gained access to the city and at once provided some food, evacuated the sick and wounded as well as replacing the garrison with fresh troops. Verdugo on the other hand managed to launch an assault, and in confused fighting managed to drive Hohenhole's French troops from a sconce and destroyed them. The success for Verudgo however was only temporary, the following morning the combined allied force mounted an attack on the besiegers. The assault was a success and many guns were captured, and realising the siege was over Verdugo retreated to the wooded Lochemse hill further South of the town. His rearguard under the command of van Anholt suffered heavily protecting the Spanish retreat and lost five ensigns as a result, whilst van Anholt was severely injured.

With the Spanish finally gone Lochem was completely free, and food provided to near starving citizens and soldiers.

Bronckhorst-Batenburg was taken to Bredevoort Castle where he later died, while Verdugo retreated to Groenlo. Taxis with his detachment however headed North and captured the fortress city of Steenwijk, the key to the north-east of the Netherlands that had defied Rennenberg.

== Bibliography ==
- Canete, Hugo A (2015). La Guerra de Frisia. Ed Platea. ISBN 9788494288432.
- Duerloo, Luc (2012). Dynasty and Piety: Archduke Albert (1598-1621) and Habsburg Political Culture in an Age of Religious Wars. shgate Publishing, Ltd. ISBN 9781409443759.
- Nolan, John (1997). Sir John Norreys and the Elizabethan Military World. Exeter: University of Exeter Press. ISBN 0859895483.
- Tracy, James (2008). The Founding of the Dutch Republic: War, Finance, and Politics in Holland, 1572-1588. OUP Oxford. ISBN 9780191607288.
- van den Broek, J.F.J (2009). Voor god en mijn koning, Volume 3 (Dutch). Uitgeverij Van Gorcum. ISBN 9789023245131.
- Vázquez, Alonso (1879). Guerras de Flandes y Francia en tiempo de Alejandro Farnese. Madrid: Ginesta. OCLC 42661016.
