= Siege of Deventer =

Siege of Deventer may refer to:

- Siege of Deventer (1123), conflict between Henry V, Holy Roman Emperor and Lotharius of Supplinburg, duke of Saxony
- Siege of Deventer (1179), conflict between Gerard III, Count of Guelders and Baldwin II of Holland, bishop of Utrecht
- Siege of Deventer (1456), by Philip of Burgundy
- Siege of Deventer (1578), by George van Lalaing, better known as the count of Rennenberg (successful)
- Siege of Deventer (1591), Prince Maurice took the city from the Spanish
- Siege of Deventer (1814), the French occupied the city after defeating the Cossacks
