= Siege of Steenwijk =

Siege of Steenwijk may refer to:

- Siege of Steenwijk (1580–81)
- Siege of Steenwijk (1592)
