= Battle of Noordhorn =

Part of the Eighty Years' War

- Part of the Eighty Years' War
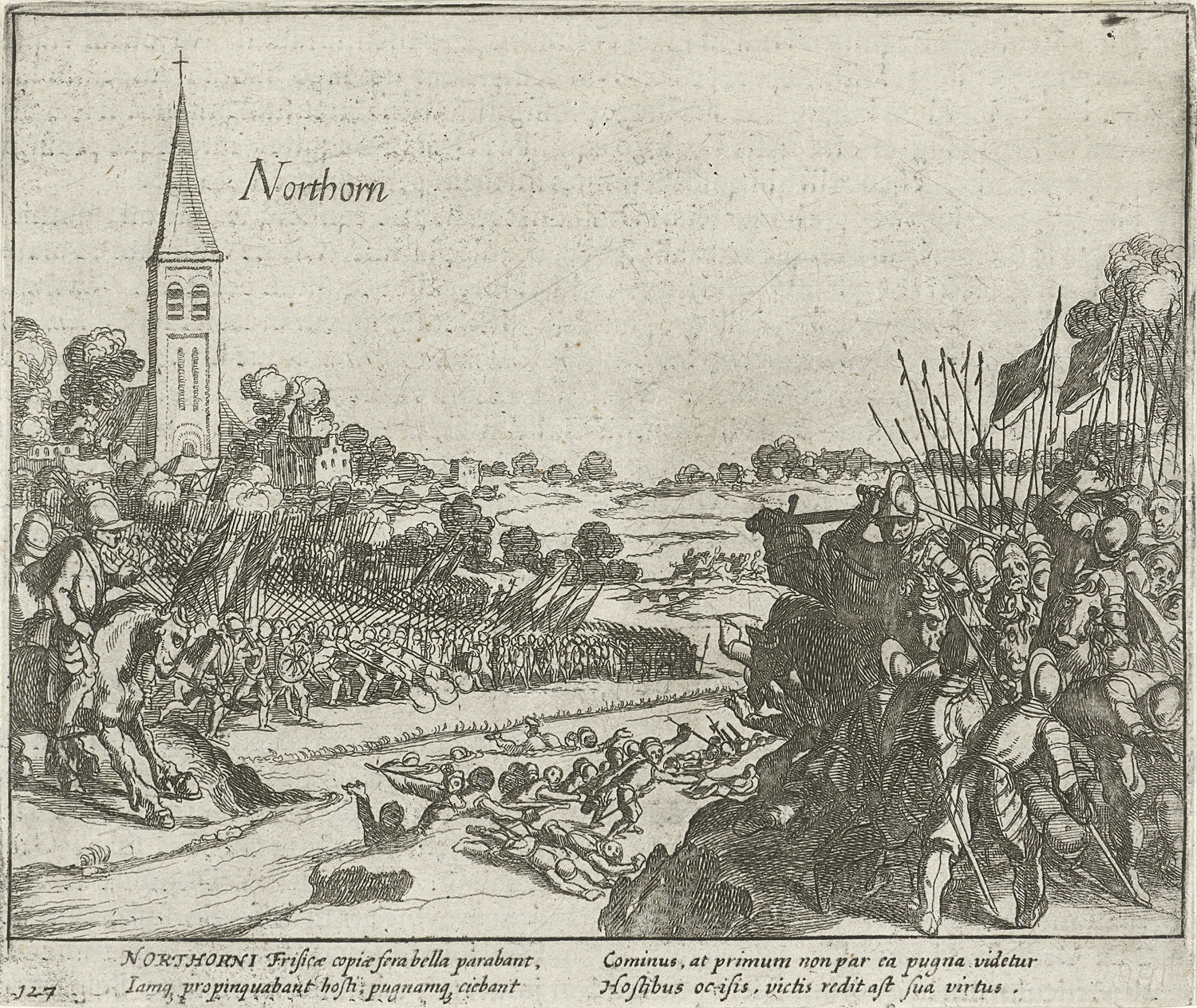
- The States' army in Noordhorn defeated by Verdugo, 1581. Simon Frisius, 1613–1615.
Date	30 September 1581
Location	Near Noordhorn, Lordship of Groningen (present-day Netherlands)
Result	Spanish victory

Belligerents
Spain	(Dutch Republic) States-General

Commanders and leaders
(Spain) Francisco Verdugo	(Dutch Republic) John Norreys (Dutch Republic) William Louis of Nassau-Dillenburg

Strength
Exact number unknown: 3 infantry regiments, 4 cavalry companies, no artillery	3,000 infantry, 500 cavalry, 5 cannons

Casualties and losses
Unknown	2,000 to 3,000 killed, 5 cannons

The Battle of Noordhorn, fought on 30 September 1581, was a pitched battle of the Dutch Revolt, fought between a Spanish army commanded by Colonel Francisco Verdugo – consisting of Walloon, German, Spanish, and Albanian soldiers – and a Dutch States rebel army under the Englishman John Norreys – comprising English, Scottish, Dutch, and Walloon troops – in the province of Groningen. In 1580, the Dutch stadtholder of Groningen, George van Lalaing, Count of Rennenberg, had shifted his allegiance from the Dutch to the Spanish side. This opened a new front at the back door of the Dutch Republic, forcing the States-General to dispatch forces to the north. That year the Dutch, under the leadership of John Norreys, succeeded in relieving the town of Steenwijk. In July 1581, Rennenberg died and was replaced by the Spaniard Francisco Verdugo, whose arrival in Groningen with reinforcements changed the situation. On 30 September Verdugo forced Norreys to give battle using a strategy of attrition.

The battle was fought on a rough, marshy ground very favorable to the Spanish army. Norrey's initial assault on the Spanish right wing was successful, but the Spanish cavalry, led by Verdugo, routed the Dutch cavalry under William Louis, Count of Nassau-Dillenburg and broke the States' infantry. The English left was then cut off from the rest of the States' army and destroyed. During the pursuit of the States' troops Verdugo was nearly captured, but left unharmed in the end. Both Norreys and Count William Louis were wounded, and their army suffered a heavy death toll, losing many flags and all five of its guns. Verdugo could not capitalize on his victory because of a mutiny the following day by his German regiments and heavy flooding. The military situation in Friesland, however, had reached a turning point, and in 1582 the Spanish made great advances, even taking Steenwijk on 17 November 1582.

== Background ==
In 1580, during the Eighty Years' War, the Dutch stadtholder of Groningen, George van Lalaing, Count of Rennenberg, though having been appointed by the rebellious States-General, shifted his allegiance to the Spanish government, held at that time by Don Alexander Farnese, Prince of Parma. In July 1581 after being defeated by John Norreys and Diederik Sonoy at Kollum, Lalaing fell ill and died in the city of Groningen. Parma sent one of his most accomplished officers, the Spaniard Francisco Verdugo, to take the place of the deceased stadtholder. Verdugo, born in Talavera but raised amongst the Flemish and married to a daughter of the later governor-general of the Netherlands, Peter Ernst von Mansfeld, began his career as a simple soldier, but rose through the ranks to become a colonel. He was considered by the historian Charles Maurice Davies "a leader of eminent skill and ability", and was promoted to the post over other candidates such as Colonel Maarten Schenck van Nydeggen, whom Farnese had earlier sent to relieve Rennenberg and had dealt a serious defeat to a Dutch army at the Battle of Hardenberg, on 17 June 1580.

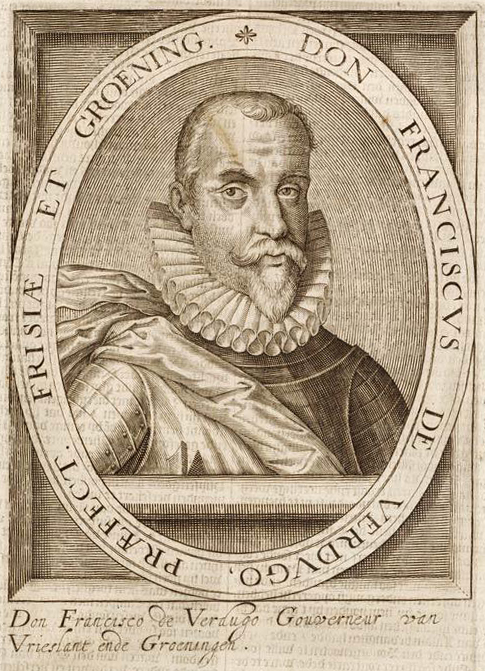
Francisco Verdugo, stadtholder of Friesland for Philip II of Spain. Hillebrant Jacobsz. van Wouw I.

Verdugo, having been forced by the Union of Arras – formed by the Dutch provinces loyal to Spanish King Philip II, who wanted the foreign troops out of the Netherlands – to hand over his regiment to his brother-in-law Charles von Mansfeld, recruited a regiment of 2,000 Walloon arquebusiers and made his way to Friesland. While mustering his infantry in the village of Kerpen, Verdugo learned that the Dutch rebels were leaving a company of German reiters – a type of armoured cavalry armed with pistols – in Cologne under a rittmeister called Adam von Langen. As he lacked cavalry or pikemen and it was reported by Spanish agents that von Langen was angry because he had been paid by the Dutch with false coins, Verdugo managed to convince the rittmeister to escort his arquebusiers to Groningen. Passing through Bredevoort and Coevorden, Verdugo and his regiment reached Groningen. There, Verdugo was met with a mutiny, which he ended by distributing 40,000 escudos amongst the mutineers, disbanding an undisciplined German regiment, and giving license to two companies of men-at-arms to join Farnese's army in Hainault. With the loyal troops, meanwhile, he took two Dutch forts, one at the mouth of the Emden and another near Groningen.

Verdugo's arrival quickly altered the situation in Friesland, which had until then been favourable to the Dutch. During 1580, the Dutch forces fighting Rennenberg in Friesland had failed to prevent him from taking the towns of Oldenzaal and Coevorden, but in December, under the leadership of the English Colonel John Norreys, a veteran soldier with experience in the Netherlands and Ireland, they had succeeded in relieving Steenwijk from a Spanish siege. Norreys, appointed "Master of the Camp" by the Dutch States-General, harassed the Spanish army during the winter of 1580–1581, forcing Rennenberg to lift the siege and withdrew in February. The most effective force of the Dutch army in Friesland was Norreys' English regiment. Though England was not officially at war against Spain, Queen Elizabeth I was playing a complex diplomatic role to keep the Dutch revolt alive, and this included sending troops to the Netherlands under the guise of "volunteers", but factually maintained by the English crown.

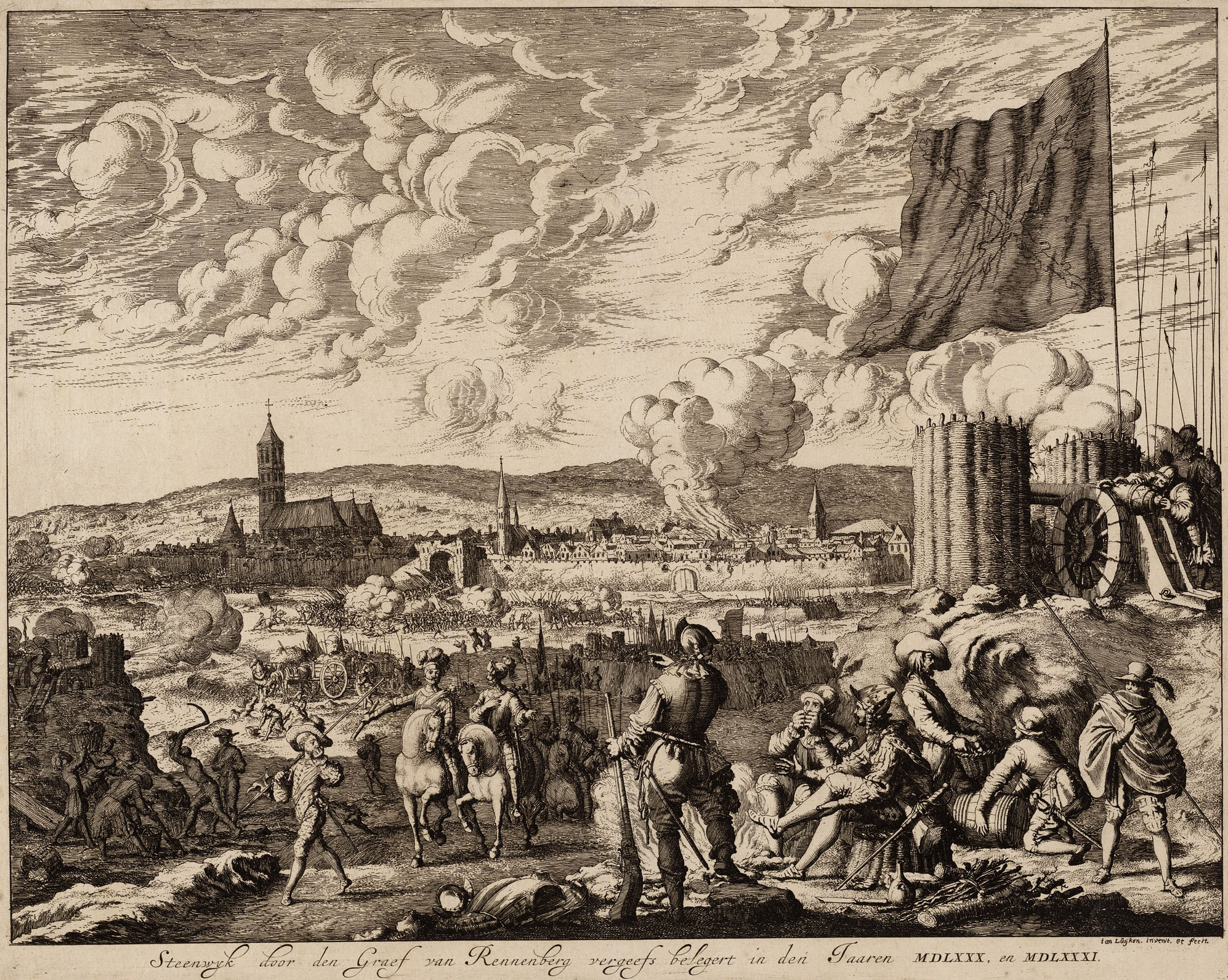
Siege of Steenwijk in 1580–81 by Count Rennenberg. Jan Luyken, 1679

In June 1581, the States-General appointed Norreys General of all the States' troops beyond the Meuse. In August, the Dutch local council, assembled in Leeuwarden, tasked Norreys with preventing Verdugo from penetrating further into the country, for which his 30 companies of infantry were reinforced by five cavalry companies under William Louis, Count of Nassau-Dillenburg. He was expected to besiege the Spanish forts around Groningen, but he lacked the artillery to do so, having been given only four small guns. Moreover, Norreys' Dutch and Walloon soldiers were unhappy with being under the command of a foreigner. Norreys spent the summer months attempting in vain to blockade Groningen, while Verdugo, who was aware of the dissent amongst the Dutch army, patiently waited in his fortified posts despite being urged by the local authorities to confront Norreys. In early September, after a failed raid on his camp, Verdugo was sure of Norreys' intentions of giving battle, and thus he advanced his army to near Norreys' camp near the village of Noordhorn. Shortly thereafter, determined to fight, Norreys' Anglo-Dutch army was deployed over the dike of Niezijl.

== Order of battle ==
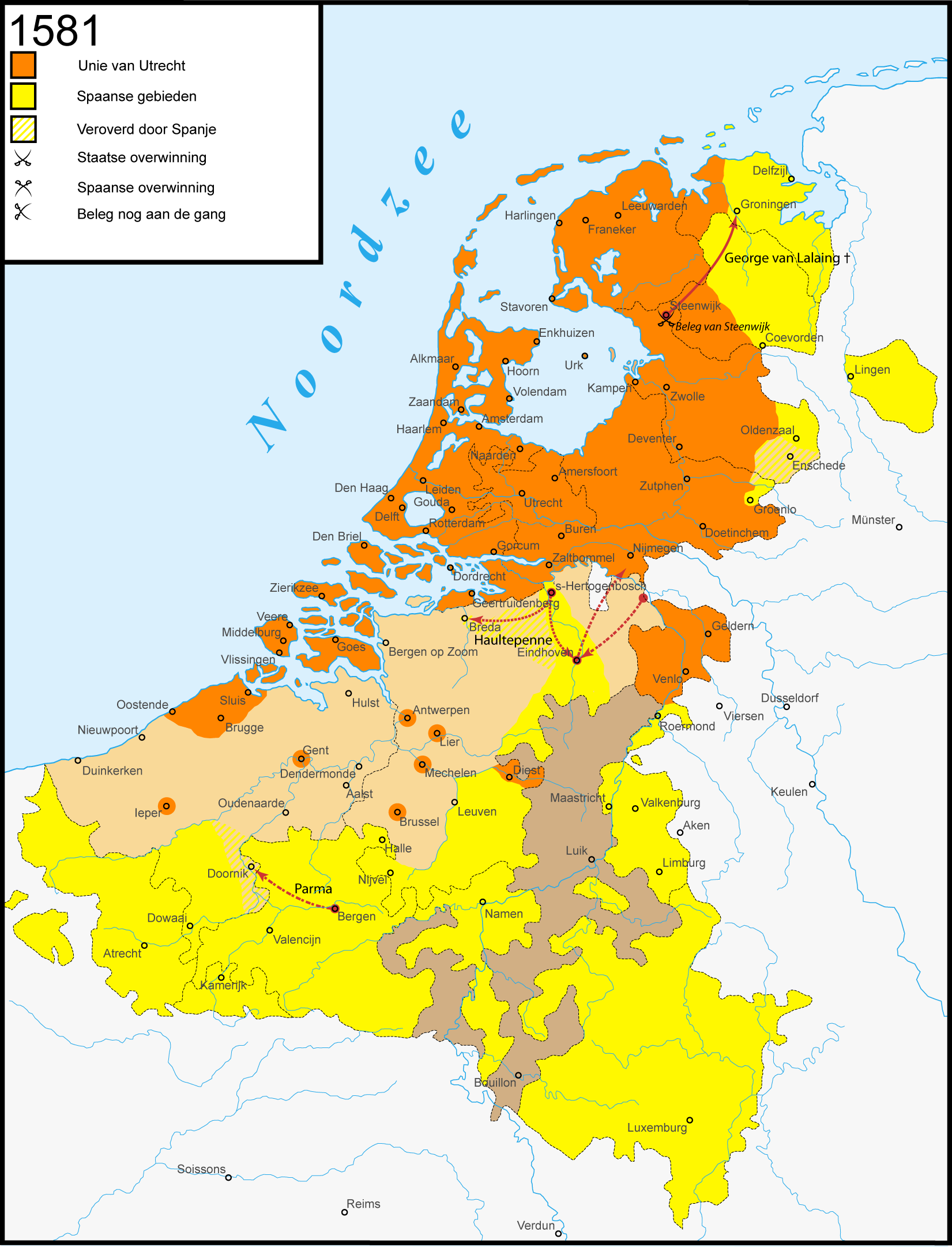
Battles and operation of the Eighty Years' War in 1581

The Spanish army, led by Francisco Verdugo, with Lieutenant-Colonel Johann Baptista von Taxis as second in command, was deployed before the village of Noordhorn and behind broken ground with only one access point that was covered by a wide ravine and flanked on its left by a series of muddy ditches. Aiming to create a trap for Norreys' army, the Spanish had smoothed the ground on their right in order to funnel English units and draw Norrey's troops into an engagement area where a crossfire effect could be created. Verdugo himself drove two stakes into the ground to mark the point that his cavalry was to charge upon the English vanguard.

The Spanish army was organized into three infantry battalions with two cavalry companies at each wing: the right wing was taken by the Walloon mounted harquebusiers under Monsieur de Villers and Verdugo's Spanish lances under Corporal Alonso Mendo, plus a battalion formed by half of Verdugo's Walloon foot regiment. 200 arquebusiers were detached later in a house nearby. The centre was made up by one battalion formed by the German foot regiments of Rennenberg, under Lieutenant Colonel Guillaume de Monceau, and of Caspar de Robles, who was serving Farnese and had left the command to Lieutenant Colonel Johann Baptista von Taxis. The left consisted of two cavalry companies (Famiano Strada names German reiters under Wolfgang Prengier, while Alonso Vázquez mentions Albanian horse under Captain Tomas Frate and Walloons under Baron de Bievres) plus a battalion formed by the second half of Verdugo's foot regiment. Verdugo also deployed a forlorn hope of 200 musketeers and arquebusiers into a ditch covering the way, 300 steps ahead of his three foot battalions.

The Anglo-Dutch army under John Norreys and Count William Louis of Nassau-Dillenburg was formed by 30 companies of foot – 11 English and Scottish flags from the regiments of Norreys and Colonel Thomas Morgan, and 19 Dutch, Frisian and Walloon flags – plus four cavalry companies under Captains Hendrik van Eck, Goor, Elleborn and Roger Williams, the latter of English cuirassiers. There existed a certain hostility between Norreys and Morgan, as Prince William of Orange favored Norreys despite Morgan's longer experience in the Netherlands, having served since 1572. When Queen Elizabeth's secretary and advisor Francis Walsingham requested Orange appoint Morgan as a colonel, he refused, and Morgan attributed this to Norreys' "hard dealings".

== Battle ==
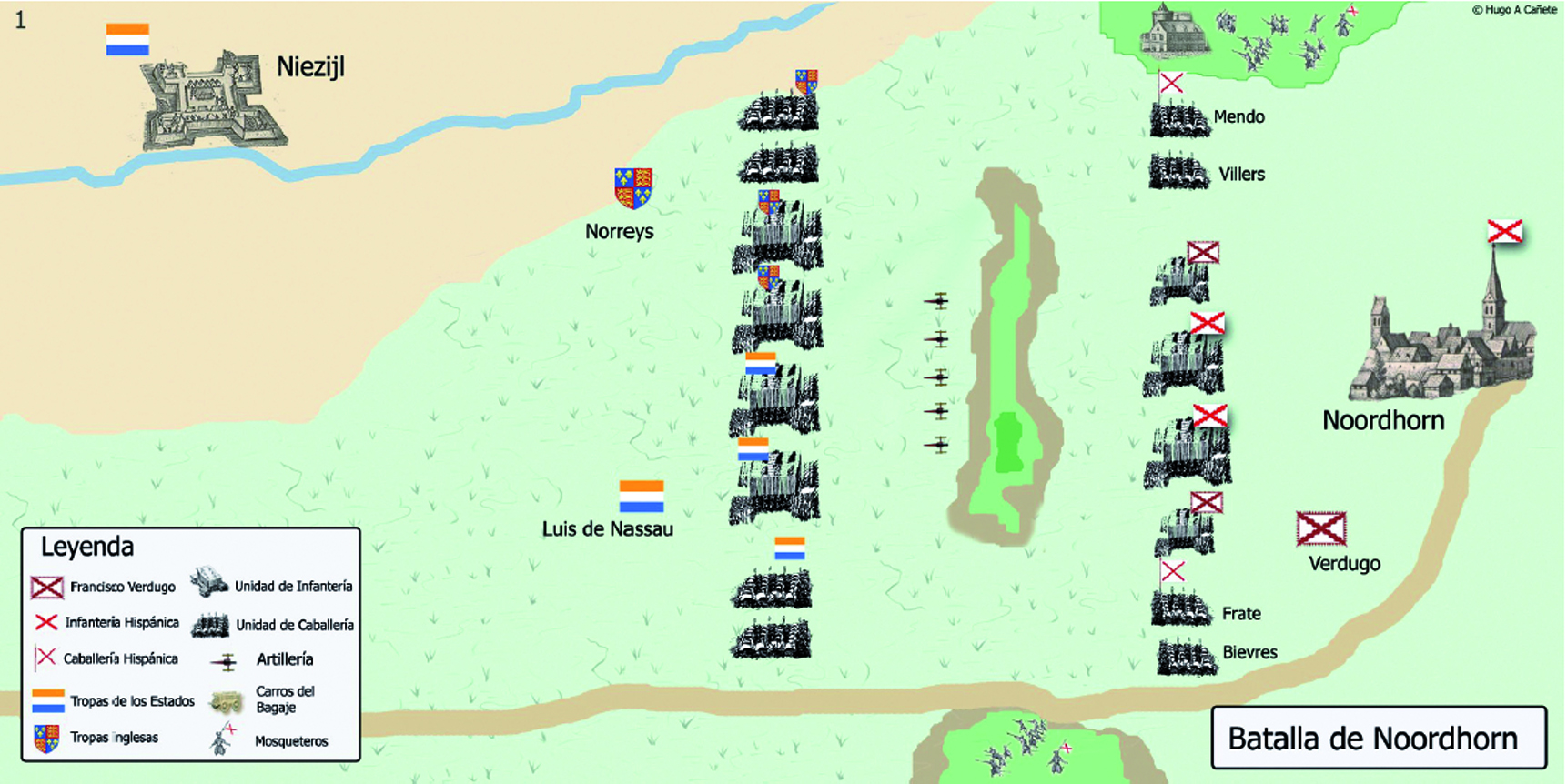
Positions of the troops at the beginning of the battle of Noordhorn.

Sons, seeing how the enemy is posted and how bad had formed his squadrons, with the favor of God victory is ours and consists only in you stand firm and do not move without my order, for the first of the two armies that moves will be lost.
Francisco Verdugo to his army before the battle

Having instructed his troops to hold their positions until he ordered them to attack, Verdugo sent 200 musketeers to occupy a house on his right flank, near the Villers' position and that of his own companies of horse, to cut off the Anglo-Dutch vanguard with musketry fire as they advanced towards the Spanish positions. After that, Spanish and English armies began to skirmish. Verdugo aimed to take over a hill in the middle of both armies in order to force Norreys to order a general advance. The Englishman fired over the Spanish battalions with his five guns, but the fire was ineffective because of the broken ground: Spanish sources state that only Verdugo's drummer was killed. Seeing the ineffectiveness of the bombardment, Norreys ordered a general advance. As the way was narrow, the Dutch cavalry went in advance, flanked by the English infantry. Monsieur de Villers' harquebusiers and Verdugo's lances under Corporal Mendo ignored their general's orders, and charged against the Dutch cavalry, which drove back them "broken and disrupted". The English infantry, upon Norreys' order, charged the Spanish foot on the right, gaining more ground despite the difficult advance, and pushing back Verdugo's Walloons to Noordhorn.

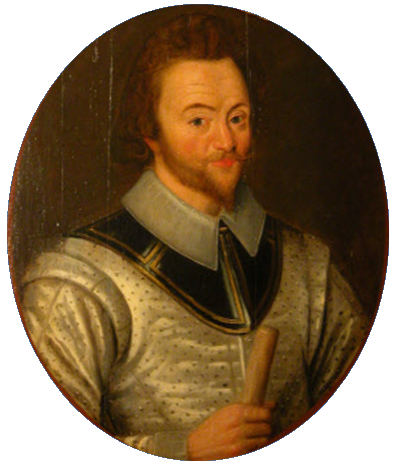
Sir John Norreys – Unknown author, 1600–1629

On the left, on the other hand, Count William Louis of Nassau advanced with the remaining Dutch cavalry but was halted by the musketry fire of the 200 men standing on the advanced ditch. Aiming to disrupt the Dutch right, Verdugo then charged ahead of Frate's Albanian company and that of Baron de Bievres. The Dutch horse, disorganized by the musketry fire, could not resist Verdugo's rush and turned back, breaking the order, in turn, of the English foot standing behind. To capitalize on this success, Verdugo ordered his foot to follow up the victory. Unaware of the Spanish success on the other side of the field, the English infantry continued pressing back the Spanish right flank until they reached the Spanish camp. When they realized what had happened, however, the Englishmen turned back in a vain attempt to escape. The Spanish centre and left were blocking the way, and thus the English attempted to save themselves fleeing across the bogged ditches, only to be killed in large numbers.

In the meantime, Verdugo aimed to block Niezijl's dike with Frate's and Bievres' companies, but as these troops lagged behind, he found himself alone on the dike when Norreys and his officers attempted to retreat to their camp. Alone, Verdugo fought desperately against them. Twice the Spanish commander was taken prisoner, but in the end, as he killed or wounded many of his foes, Norreys preferred to let him go free rather than risk allowing the pursuing Spanish troops to capture himself or his remaining men. Once he had recovered, Verdugo massed some cavalry and completed the Anglo-Dutch defeat by destroying an English troop which, trying to save the flags, fled across a field towards the Niezijl canal. Most of the English flags and all of their artillery were lost. As the night was falling, Verdugo collected his troops and returned to Noordhorn, where they formed into squadron formation and, kneeling down, prayed to thank God for their victory.

== Aftermath ==
The battle was "a very greate overthrowe" for the English, as noted by the affluent English trader Sir Christopher Hoddesdon in a letter written in Antwerp on 15 October. The Frenchman Gillaume Baudart noted that half of the States' infantry and a large number of cavalry were lost. Verdugo claimed between 2,000 and 3,000 casualties in Norrey's army, asserting that "Few times is true the number of dead that in such cases is said, but the common [number] for those who saw it was this". Many English and Dutch officers were killed, mostly of foot: Charles van Wijngaerden, George Robert, Schul, Wynaert van Ommeren, Rets, Gerard Entens, Corneille Loevesschen and, for the English, captains Cotton, Bishop, Fitzwilliams, and Nisbeth, who died of a wound on the head. Amongst the cavalry Hendrik van Eck and Lieutenant Bellewijn of Elleborn's company were killed. Both States' commanders were wounded: Norreys on one hand and Count William Louis in a leg. The Spanish army's exact losses are unknown. Alonso Vázquez, a contemporaneous chronicler and soldier with direct access to the Spanish, wrote that "of the Catholics died no more than Verdugo's drummer, but there were some wounded". Charles Maurice Davies noted that "Scarcely any one of note fell on the side of the royalists".

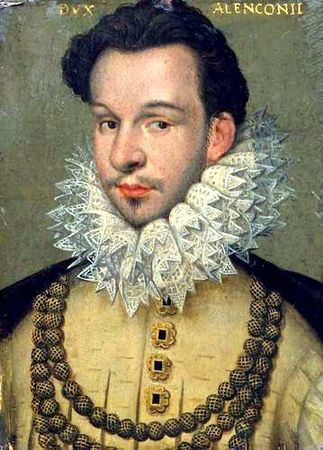
Francis, duke of Anjou – Nicholas Hilliard, 1577

The day after the battle, the Spanish army's German regiments, induced by Captain Jean van der Cloester, mutinied again in their quarters, claiming that they had not received their monthly pay. Verdugo sent Captain Pedrosa to take news of the Spanish victory to Farnese and, having refreshed his troops, aimed to capture the Niezijl fort with his Walloon regiment, his four cavalry companies and a few volunteers from among the German mutineers. As the season changed and a furious rain started, Verdugo was forced to abandon the project of seizing the fort and returned to Noordhorn. The autumnal floods made the Frisian land impassable for the armies, and thus Verdugo moved with his troops to the dry and gritty land of Drenthe, while Norreys kept the remains of his army behind the IJssel river. A group of 400 Dutchmen in Norreys' army lodged themselves in the town of Keppel, in Gelderland. In January 1582, Verdugo destroyed them and seized Keppel and the castle of Bronckhorst, achieving great success in Gelderland.

Over the following months many English soldiers, who were unpaid and decimated by disease and disappointed by the progress of the war, amongst them Captain Roger Williams, deserted the States-General army and went to serve in Francis, Duke of Anjou's French army. By the Treaty of Plessis-les-Tours, Francis had been recognized by the States-General as the sovereign of the Netherlands instead of Philip II of Spain. Even Norreys, in the end, left the States' service and put himself under Anjou's command. Thus, in command of the English infantry, he found himself at the Battle of Steenbergen in 1583, when he covered the rearguard of the defeated French army.
