= Battle of Kollum =

Battle during the Eighty Years' War

- Part of the Eighty Years' War
| Date | 19 July 1581 |
| Location | Kollum (present-day the Netherlands) |
| Result | States-General victory |

Belligerents
| (Dutch Republic) States-General | Spain |

Commanders and leaders
| (Dutch Republic) John Norreys (Dutch Republic) Diederik Sonoy | (Spain) George van Lalaing |

Strength
| 4,000 | 5,000 |

Casualties and losses
| Light | 700 killed, wounded, or captured |

The Battle of Kollum was a military engagement that took place on 16 July 1581 during the Eighty Years' War. The battle was fought between an States-General force under John Norreys and Diederik Sonoy, respectively, and a Spanish force under George van Lalaing, Count of Rennenberg. The Dutch and English were victorious, and as a result of the defeat Rennenberg, already ill, died two days later.

In March 1580 George van Lalaing, Count Rennenberg, had turned against William the Silent and then declared for Spain. This caused outrage amongst the Dutch, with many even coming over to the side of the rebels. Rennenberg led an army to lay siege at Steenwijk but was defeated when an Anglo-Dutch relief army under John Norreys arrived.

Many of Rennenberg's army were sick and in a mutinous mood; they fled east towards Groningen, with Norreys in pursuit not too far behind. Rennenberg, hoping to catch his pursuers off guard, turned and faced them at Kollum. Norreys attacked almost at once, sweeping away the Spanish forces from the field, who then fled all the way to Groningen itself. The battle was one-sided and a heavy defeat; Spanish casualties were heavy with 700 killed, wounded, or captured and in addition the loss of all their military baggage and all four of their field guns. Rennenberg, who had been too ill to take command, died four days later at Groningen.

Rennenberg's successor Francisco Verdugo soon attacked again at Noordhorn; this time Norreys was defeated in the pitched battle.
