= Siege of Geertruidenberg (1593) =

Part of the Eighty Years' and Anglo-Spanish Wars

- Part of the Eighty Years' War & the Anglo–Spanish War
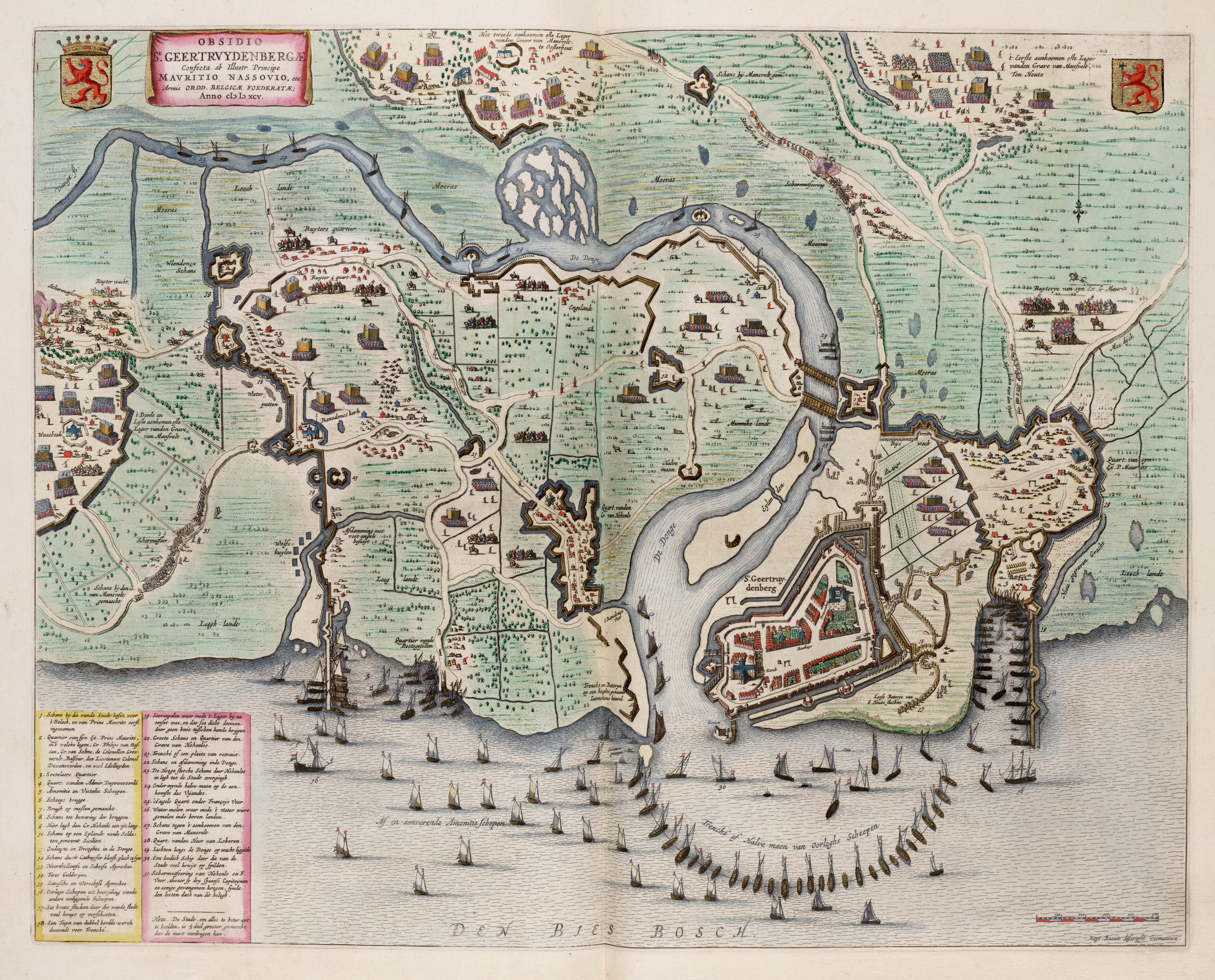
- Siege of Geertruidenberg in 1594 by Giovanni Battista Boazio – the semi circle curve at bottom are brigantines blockading the city
Date	27 March – 24 June 1593
Location	Geertruidenberg; Present day the Netherlands 51°42′03″N 4°51′37″E
Result	Dutch and English victory

Belligerents
Dutch Republic; England	(Spain) Spanish Empire

Commanders and leaders
(Dutch Republic) Maurice of Orange (England) Francis Vere	(Spain) Count of Mansfeld (Spain) Earl of Masieres † (Spain) Sieur de Gissant †

Strength
12,000	800 (Garrison); 8,000 troops & 1,500 cavalry (Relief)

Casualties and losses
Light; 500 to disease	1,000 killed wounded or captured
- Location within Netherlands

The siege of Geertruidenberg was a siege of the city of Geertruidenberg that took place between 27 March and 24 June 1593 during the Eighty Years' War and the Anglo–Spanish War. Anglo-Dutch troops under the commands of Maurice of Nassau and Francis Vere laid siege to the Spanish garrisoned city. The siege was unique in that the besiegers used a hundred ships, forming a semicircle in a chain on the Mass river to form a blockade. A Spanish force under the command of the Count of Mansfeld attempted to relieve the city in May, but they were defeated and later forced to withdraw. Three Governors of the city were killed – after the last fatality and as a result of the failed relief, the Spanish surrendered the city on 24 June 1593. The victory earned Maurice much fame and had thus become a steadfast strategist in the art of war.

== Background ==
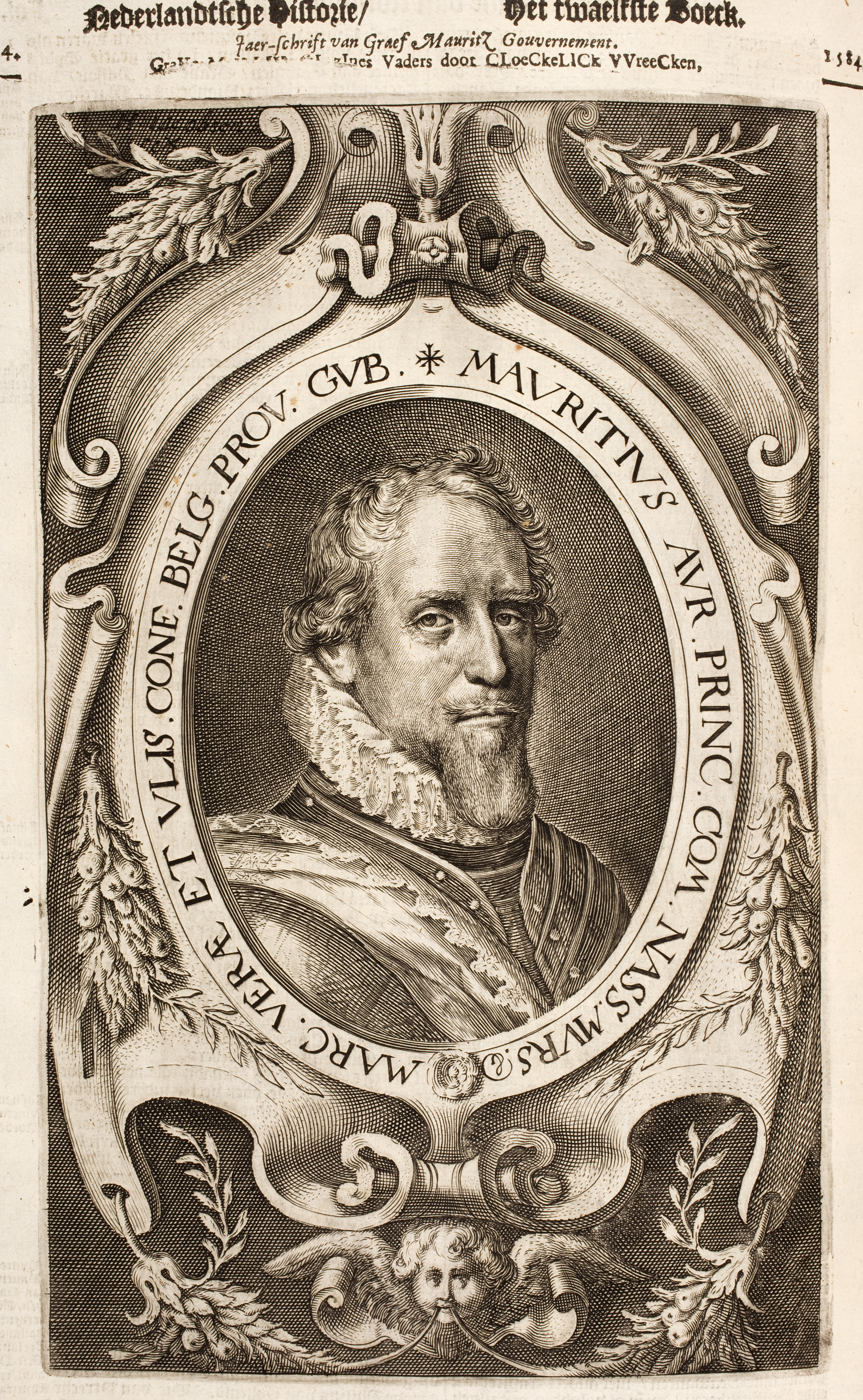
Maurice of Nassau by Emanuel van Meteren

In 1573, Geertruidenberg had been taken by a mixed Protestant force of English, French, and Dutch troops. In 1589, however, the Spaniards won the town back by successfully bribing the long underpaid English troops who had been garrisoned there. Despite this however the Spanish Army of Flanders had been hampered in its effort to overcome the local resistance. When the Spanish forces were committed in France to halt the collapse of the Catholic League, Dutch and English forces under the command of Maurice of Nassau went on the offensive. Maurice adopted the same tactics as the Duke of Parma by creating defensible barriers and zones of control; this resulted in many towns and regions falling into Anglo-Dutch hands throughout the 1590s.

In 1592, the Zeelanders urged the States-General delegates to advance on Geertruidenberg, but the decision was overruled and Groningen was chosen as more important and as such the operations continued to cut off the city. Thus during Maurice's 1592 summer offensive two cities were besieged and captured – Steenwijk fell in July and Coevorden capitulated in September which resulted in Spanish-held Groningen being strangled further by the end of the year. After the capture of both towns, this time the Frisians demanded that Groningen should be besieged. The States delegates decided otherwise, and in 1593 Geertruidenberg was chosen much to the Zealanders delight. The Frisians were bitter, and in protest, they sent no troops to Geertruidenberg. This turned into a strategy that the Dutch played upon; the Frisian troops stayed put and this forced the Spanish to think that Groningen would be besieged, forcing them to leave a sizeable garrison there.

A relative advantage for the Dutch was that Alexander Farnese, Duke of Parma, captain of the Spanish army had died of his wounds he had sustained while retreating from Caudebec in France. His replacement was Count Von Mansfeld, and the Republic ordered Philip of Nassau to launch a diversionary attack on Luxembourg. The strategy was to lure Mansfeld, also governor of Luxembourg, to pursue Nassau to the south of the Netherlands. This would then give Maurice the necessary time to surprise the Geertruidenberg garrison.

Before his pursuit of Philip, Mansfeld had already sent some companies from Groningen to Gertrudenberg. The city had been strengthened in Spanish hands and the approaches were difficult, owing to the network of ditches and canals which surrounded it. Moreover, a besieging force would be exposed to attacks from the army under Mansfeld. An elaborate set piece siege on a large scale was necessary.

Philip of Nassau's Luxembourg campaign went ahead as planned and succeeded in drawing Mansfeld away, which gained Maurice enough time to march to Geertruidenberg.

== Siege ==
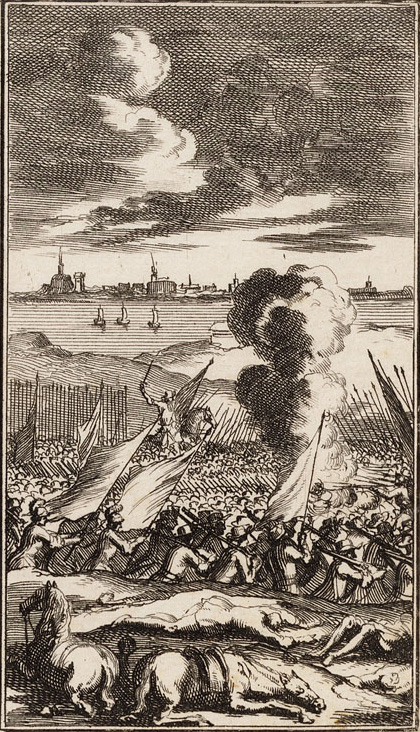
Siege of Geertruidenberg; by Jan Luyken

On 27 March 1593 Maurice arrived with his troops at Geertruidenberg; his forces were augmented by six ensigns of English under Francis Vere and ten companies of Scots under Colonel Bartholomew Balfour. The first operations were to stop all roads by which the Spanish could succour the town. On land, several forts were built which also closed Geertruidenberg overland. Windmills and dikes were constructed in order to protect against possible resistance from surrounding towns. Maurice, with the Count Solms and Groenvelt regiments, were posted on the western side; Francis Vere conducted the approaches from the south while the Hohenlohe and Brederode regiments were encamped at the village of Raamsdonk to the east.

In mid-April, the approaches against the town were commenced with works constructed and dug by the soldiers rather than the usual practice of using land labour; farmers and other civilians. The motivation of good pay and a quick end to the siege seemed to double the effort. Despite the dangers of exposed positions against fire, the works were so well constructed that they were considered stronger than fortified cities. The trenches were divided by ravelins flanking one another, each ravelin mounted two guns, and outside there was a wide water dike. Instead of a counterscarp, rows of piles were driven into the ground, being left four feet above the surface, and pointed with iron. There were four main forts, connected by smaller forts in a double line, and upwards of a hundred pieces of various artillery were mounted on the works. The river Donge, flowing from the south, supplied the moat with water while two bridges over it connected the works. In addition, the besiegers were able fortify the camp against attacks from a potential hostile army in the field. A hundred ships, forming a semicircle in the old Maas, completed the blockade, with light brigantines on the flanks, all of which were connected by strong ropes or chains.

On 8 April, a strategic outlying fort on the river was captured by troops of Count Hohenlohe after fighting that lasted five days. This was the only way into the city along this fort, and in addition, due to its height, the besiegers would be given advance warning of a relief force.

During this time, the siege developed into a lull - the camp arrangements, being of good quality, were enticing enough for locals to sell their produce, and many came from far and wide. Louise de Coligny, the fourth wife of William of Orange and Countess Louise Juliana of Nassau sister to Maurice, on her way to be married to the Elector Palatine Frederick IV visited along with other dignitaries. They were conducted over the works, and noted that they were the grandest that had ever been constructed in the annals of war.

=== Attempted relief ===
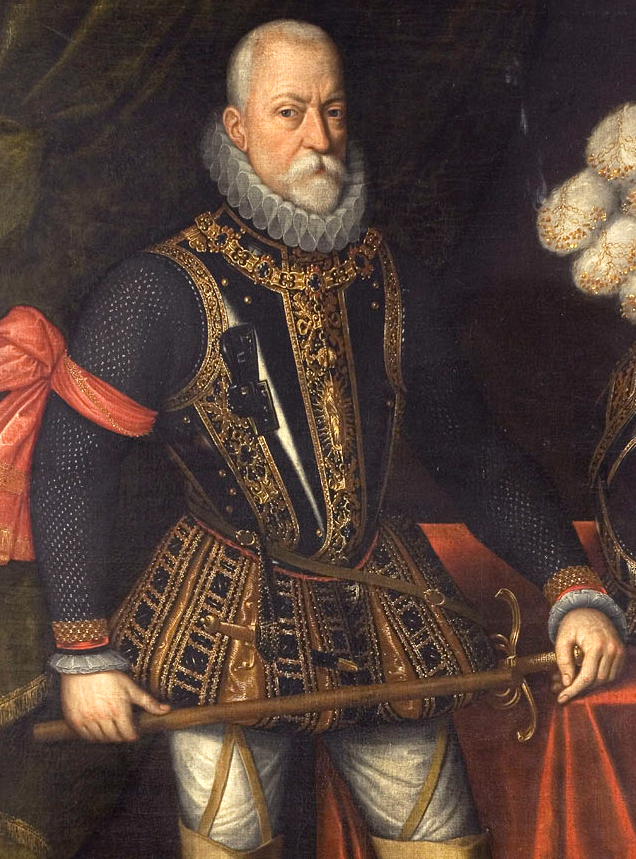
Count of Mansfeld by Antonis Mor

As Maurice had his soldiers motivated to construct a sconce, the Anglo-Dutch force was sufficiently entrenched by the beginning of May. Meanwhile, Count Mansfeld returning from his pursuit of Philip of Nassau on hearing of Gerrtudenberg's situation marched his army from Brussels as soon as it was possible to relieve the besieged city. Mansfeld in desperation even called upon his son, Karl von Mansfeld, with his detachment in France to assist his own army but this was to no avail.

On 28 May, Count Mansfeld appeared with an army of 7,000 foot and 2,000 horse, encamping in the villages of Capelle and Waalwijk, about six miles east of Gertruydenburg. This army could have been greater, had it not been for when a mutiny took place causing a large number to desert as they moved past Hainault. Mansfeld allowed his soldiers to perform various pickets upon the besieging force, but soon realised that they had been strongly entrenched. Vere then led 600 English and 1,000 Zealanders, to which they advanced against Mansfelt's forward-leading infantry and forced them back after heavy fighting. Soon after a Spanish cavalry charge probing the defences was routed in a skirmish and a convoy of their supplies nearby was ambushed. With losses increasing as a result, Mansfeld pulled his forces back but stayed within a safe distance of the besieging Anglo-Dutch.

At the beginning of June, heavy rains then caused the land around the city to become a quagmire hampering all involved in the siege. By this time galleries had been run under the ramparts in three places. The blockading fleet took a regular part in the daily cannonade along with the land batteries and caused severe damage both to the walls and the city itself.

On 25 June the Sieur de Gissant was mortally wounded by a cannon shot. He had been the third governor who had been killed during the siege, and the loss was a huge blow to the morale of the garrison. Soon after news had got through that Mansfeld had been unable to advance any further, morale plummeted further. The city then sent out emissaries to discuss terms with Maurice and an honourable surrender was agreed – Gertruydenburg after a siege of three months surrendered to Maurice.

The following day after hearing news of the city's surrender Mansfeld's force marched away and occupied the Bommelerwaard, in order to check any attempt by Maurice in that direction. Meanwhile, Gerrtudenberg's garrison was allowed to march out with their arms and colours, and in the terms agreed were to be non-combatants for the rest of the war.

== Aftermath ==
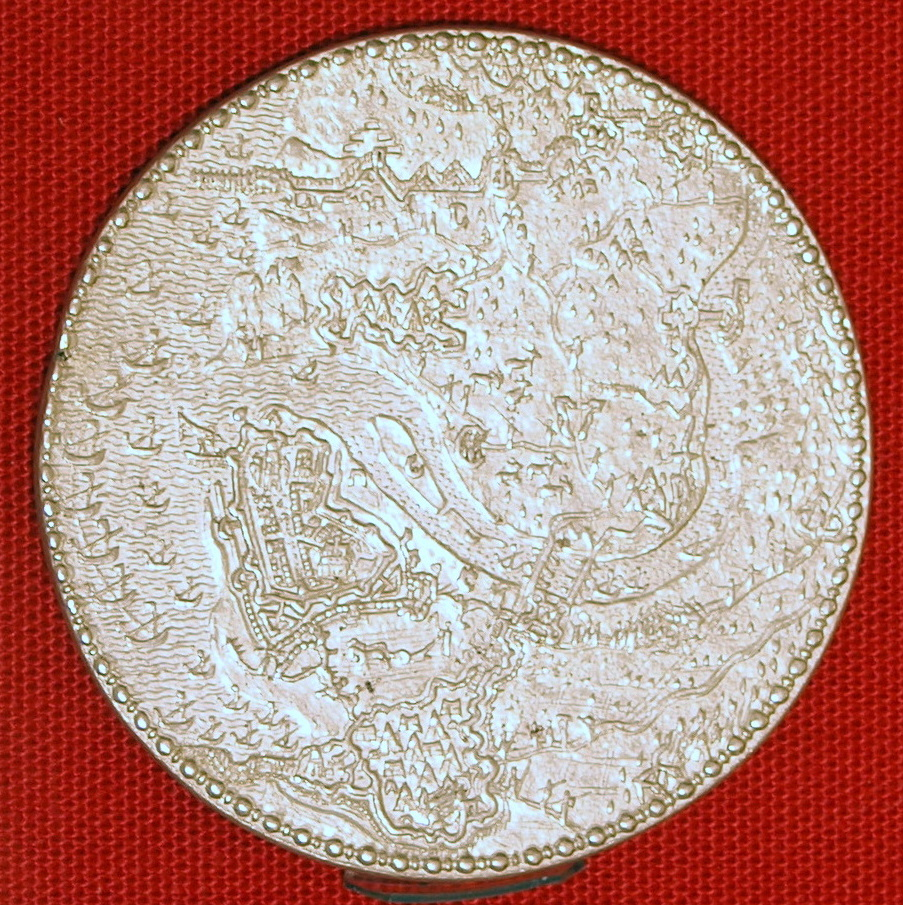
A coin commemorating the siege of Geertruidenberg

Maurice led the army into the captured city and then set about repairing and strengthening the defenses. The city was then garrisoned by the Scottish troops that took part in the siege; they remained there until the autumn of the same year. After the success at Geertruidenberg the Frisian troops urged the States-General to bring the army to Groningen. However, because there was a truce in France at this time, Mansfeld in the eyes of the Dutch, could have threatened the Republic with his large army. Maurice as a result made sure the army kept a watch on the Spanish troops threatening the south of the Republic.

The capture of Geertruidenberg had been a triumph for the Dutch and English army; as a result, all the rivers of Holland and Zeeland were in their hands. Count William of Nassau, the Stadtholder of Friesland, continued to put pressure and march against the Spanish under Francisco Verdugo who was present at Groningen and in the field in a series of manoeuvres. English troops under Francis Vere, sent aid to Count William into Friesland in July forcing the movement of Spanish regiments to reinforce Verdugo. In October the Dutch and English returned to the Hague to be billeted, and both sides went into winter quarters.

The following year after a failed Spanish attempt on Coevorden Groningen was at last captured by the Anglo-Dutch force after which the Spanish had been cleared of the Drenthe region.

The conquest of Geertruidenberg was confirmation of Maurice's great ascendency as a field commander particularly during sieges. William Louis praised the victory and compared the siege to that of Alescia in 52 BC.

== Bibliography ==
- Black, Jeremy (2005). European Warfare, 1494–1660 Warfare and History. Routledge. ISBN 9781134477081.
- Tracy Borman (1997). Sir Francis Vere in the Netherlands, 1589–1603: A Re-evaluation of His Career as Sergeant Major General of Elizabeth I's Troops. University of Hull.
- Duffy, Christopher (2013). Siege Warfare: The Fortress in the Early Modern World 1494–1660 Volume 1 of Siege warfare. Routledge. ISBN 9781136607875.
- Dunthorne, Hugh (2013). Britain and the Dutch Revolt 1560–1700. Cambridge University Press. ISBN 9781107244313.
- Edmundson, George (2013). History of Holland. Cambridge University Press. ISBN 9781107660892.
- Fissel, Mark Charles (2001). English warfare, 1511–1642; Warfare and history. London: Routledge. ISBN 978-0415214810.
- Israel, Jonathan Irvine (1998). The Dutch Republic: Its Rise, Greatness and Fall, 1477–1806 Oxford history of early modern Europe. Clarendon Press. ISBN 9780198207344.
- Jaques, Tony (2006). Dictionary of Battles and Sieges: A Guide to 8500 Battles from Antiquity Through the Twenty-first Century. Greenwood Press. ISBN 978-0313335365.
- Kunzle, David (2002). From Criminal to Courtier: The Soldier in Netherlandish Art 1550–1672 Volume 10 of History of Warfare. Brill. ISBN 9789004123694.
- MacCaffrey, Wallace T (1994). Elizabeth I: War and Politics, 1588–1603. Princeton Paperbacks Princeton University Press. ISBN 9780691036519.
- Markham, C. R. (2007). The Fighting Veres: Lives Of Sir Francis Vere And Sir Horace Vere. Kessinger Publishing. ISBN 978-1432549053.
- T.A. Morris (2002). Europe and England in the Sixteenth Century. Routledge. ISBN 9781134748204.
- van Nimwegen, Olaf (2010). The Dutch Army and the Military Revolutions, 1588–1688 Volume 31 of Warfare in History Series. Boydell & Brewer. ISBN 9781843835752.
- Wernham, Richard Bruce (1984). After the Armada: Elizabethan England and the Struggle for Western Europe, 1588–1595. Clarendon Press. ISBN 9780198227533.
- Wilson, Peter Hamish (2009). The Thirty Years War: Europe's Tragedy. Harvard University Press. ISBN 9780674036345.

External links

- The Buffs – East Kent Regiment
