= Siege of Steenwijk (1592) =

1592 siege

Siege of Steenwijk 1592
- Part of the Eighty Years' War & the Anglo–Spanish War
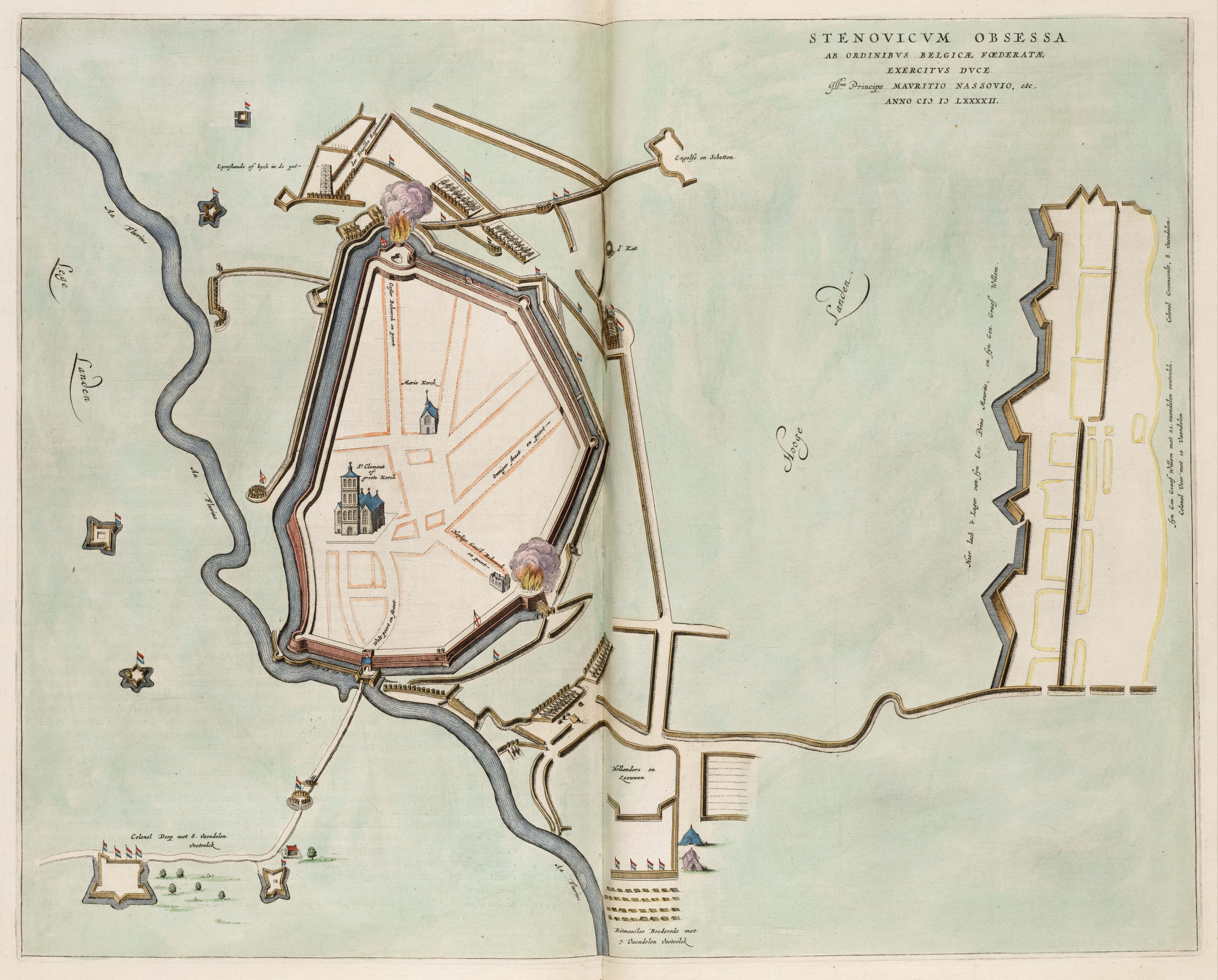
- The siege of Steenwijk in 1592; print from Atlas Van Loon: The detonations of the mines are made visible.
Date	30 May – 5 July 1592
Location	Steenwijk; Present day the Netherlands
Result	Dutch and English victory

Belligerents
Dutch Republic; England	(Spain) Spanish Empire

Commanders and leaders
(Dutch Republic) Maurice of Orange (England) Francis Vere	(Spain) Antonio Coquel (Spain) Francisco Verdugo

Strength
6,000 troops 2,000 cavalry	1,060; 300 (relief)

Casualties and losses
600 casualties	550 casualties 800 surrendered

The siege of Steenwijk was a siege that took place between 30 May and 5 July 1592 as part of the Eighty Years' War and the Anglo–Spanish War by a Dutch and English force under Maurice of Orange. By taking Steenwijk the Republic's army would take out one of the two main transport routes overland to the Drenthe capital of Groningen, the other lay at Coevorden. After a failed bombardment, an assault was made in conjunction with the detonation of mines under important bastions, and with two out of three successfully assaulted, the Spanish troops surrendered on 5 July 1592 and handed over the city to the Dutch and English army. This siege was one of the first in history to make use of pioneers as a separate military unit although they were still at the time regarded as soldiers.

== Background ==
Maurice of Orange had conducted a successful campaign from 1590 that commenced with the capture of Breda and from there an offensive was launched that soon captured several important strategic cities, which included Nijmegen During this campaign Delfzijl was captured which meant that Groningen was gradually getting cut off.

The States determined to open the campaign with the siege of Steenwijk, a strongly fortified town on the route from the IJssel at Deventer in order to cut off Groningen further. This was however against the wishes of the Zeeland representatives in the States-General who preferred to see Geertruidenberg taken, or a campaign to be conducted in Spanish held Flanders. The Duke of Parma had marched into France, leaving Ernst I von Mansfeld as his deputy, while Francisco Verdugo was in command of the area as the Spanish Stadtholder of Friesland, Groningen, Drenthe, and Overijssel.

Steenwijk is located in the northern corner of the province of Overijssel, bordering on the Zuyder Zee, called Vollenhove. The city had been besieged by Count Rennenberg in 1581 but a relief army led by John Norreys defeated the besiegers who were forced to retreat. In November 1582, the Spaniards, led by Juan Baptista de Tasis then took Steenwijk and held it for Spain.

On 28 May 1592 Maurice took to the field with six thousand foot, two thousand cavalry, and fifty guns. This included the English contingent under Francis Vere of 1,344 men consisting of twelve companies of infantry under his brother Horace Vere, Oliver Lambart, John Buck and four troops of cavalry numbering 300 men under Sir Robert Sidney. Maurice was able to bring his siege train via the waterways.

== Siege ==
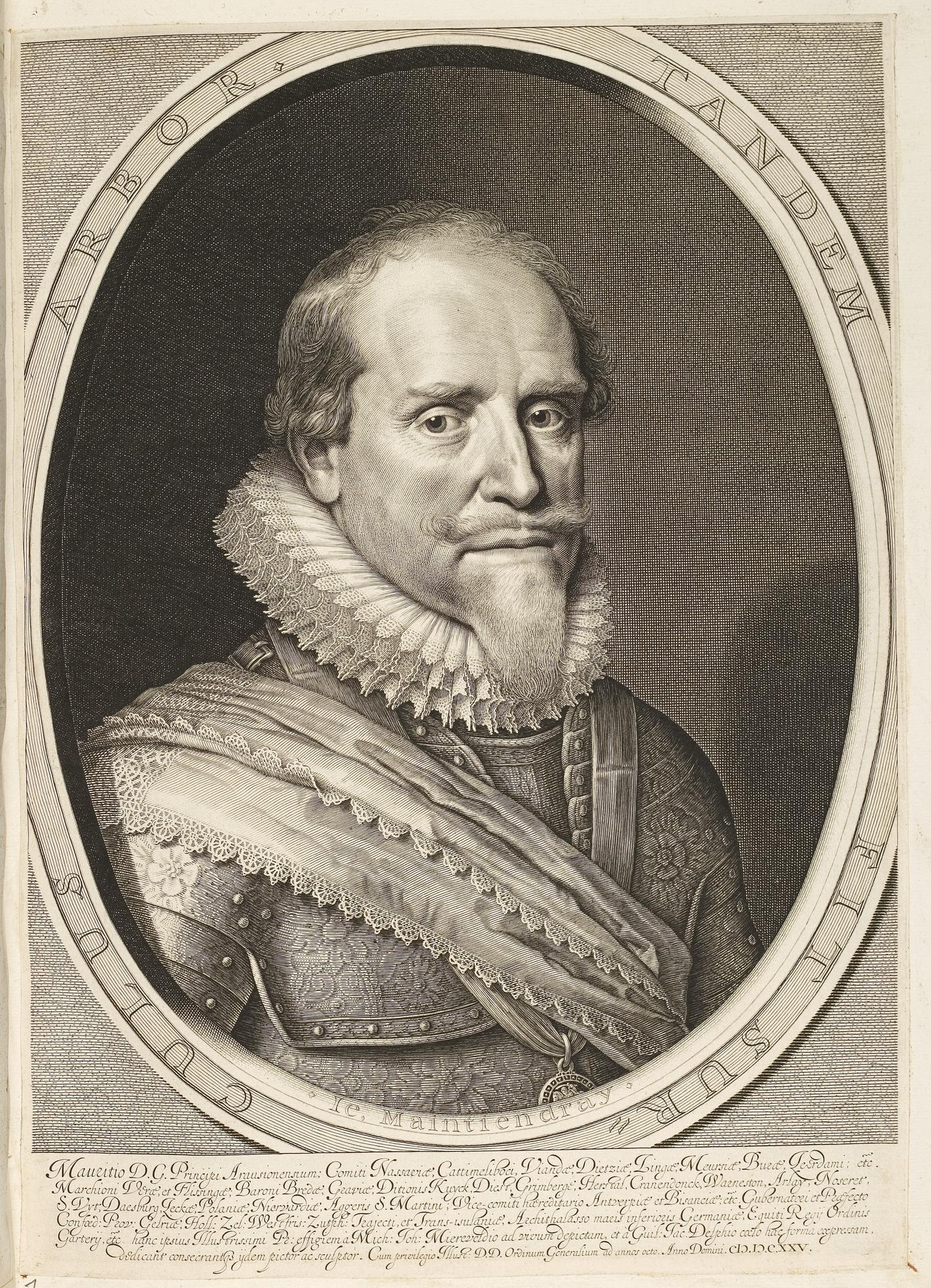
Maurice, Prince of Orange print by Hugo Grotius

On 7 May 1592, the Anglo-Dutch army encamped before Steenwijk and entrenchments were dug round the city. Steenwijk was held largely by a militia garrison of sixteen companies of foot and some cavalry under Antonio Coquel who was the military governor. In addition to these were 1,000 pro-Spanish Walloon infantry under Louis Van Den Burgh. The place had been strengthened with earthworks and well provisioned by Cocquel. Francisco Verdugo, wanted to send extra troops to protect the city, but most were in Brittany or Normandy fighting the Protestants there, and also Peter Ernst I of Mansfeld refused to let troops out of Brabant as it was considered more important to hold.

The approaches to Steenwijk were dug mainly on the south side, where the infantry was encamped. A cavalier was raised, nineteen feet high, from which to bombard the parapets, and all the guns were moved into position. The English directed the works on their side and by 10 June the counterscarp had been reached on all sides. Sconces were built, in order to protect against a possible Spanish relief force.

On the 13th the guns opened fire at the walls with 6,000 rounds of solid shot on the first day. During the siege Maurice used new siege techniques; farmers were usually hired to lay the trenches, but this time the soldiers did this work and were formed into pioneers under the direction of Maurice's military engineers Joost Mattheus and Jacob Kemp. This at the time was very unusual and was one of the first military events in history to use this method.

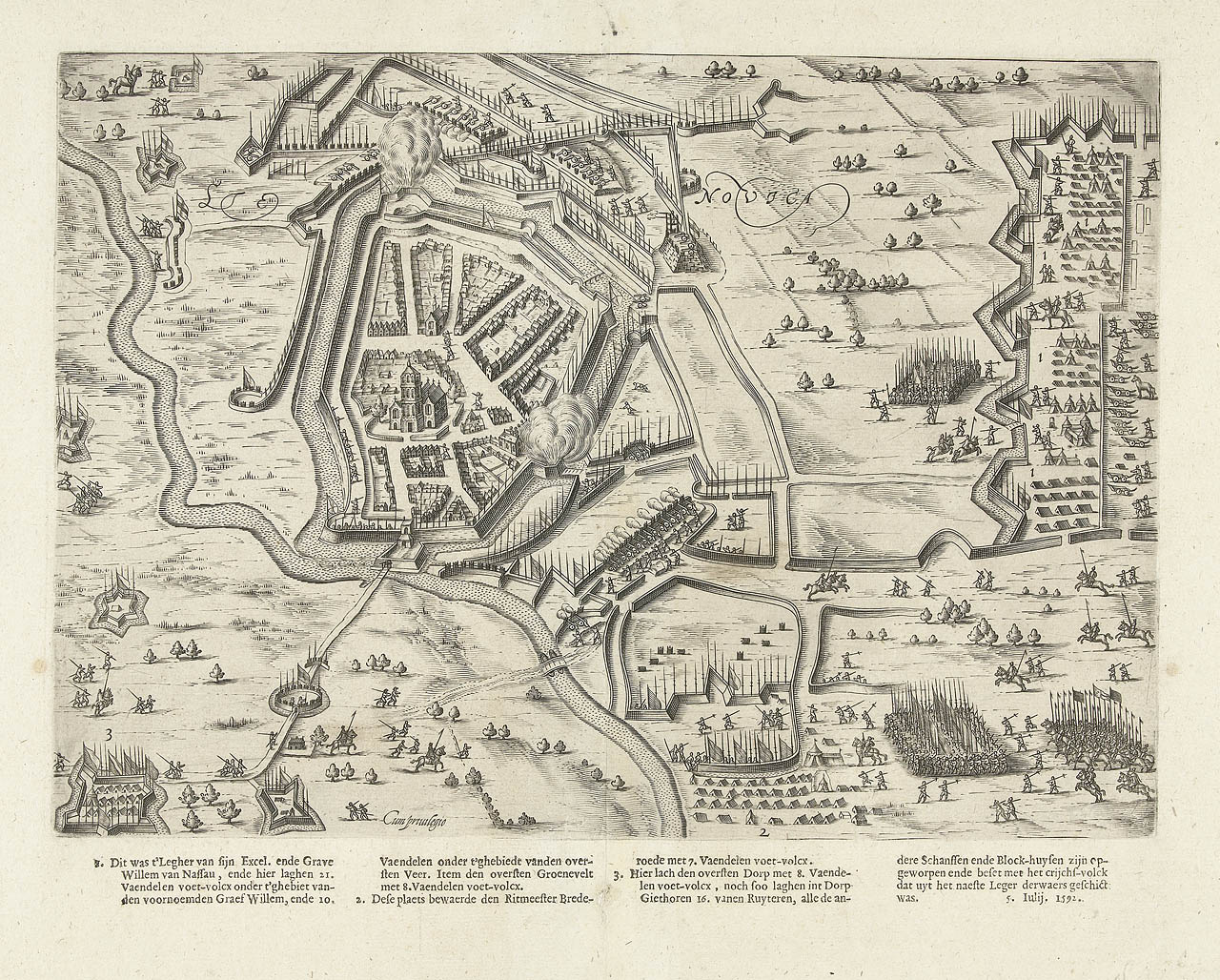
A view of the siege from print by Bartholomeus Dolendo

On 19 June the besieged sent out a deputation to treat for an honourable surrender, and despite Maurice entertaining the negotiators in his tent he demanded nothing but unconditional surrender. Nothing came from the conference and the bombardment recommenced but the walls were so strong that no practicable breach could be made. 29,000 cannonballs in total were fired at the town, but little damage was made on the walls or even in the city.

Soon after Francisco Verdugo attempted to reinforce the place with 300 veteran Spanish troops under his command. The effort however largely failed since only sixty managed to join the garrison having slipped past - most were killed or captured. All the while the Spanish attempted a number of sorties which were successful in causing damage to the Anglo-Dutch siege lines and even brought in a number of prisoners with losses of only six men.

On the 23rd a ravelin was captured by a Dutch assault group on the west side which meant that it was possible for mining to be resorted to. Ten days later three mines had been run under the defences, besides a way through the ditch, from the English approaches under the Eastern bulwark and the Oeningerpoort. Another was made under the Gast huys bulwark and three days passed in perfecting the mines and placing the charges of powder of which were filled respectively with 5,250 pounds of powder.

On the night of 3 July the whole army was secretly drawn into the trenches, and at dawn the mines were to be fired and a general assault delivered. At sunrise, three tremendous explosions were created and almost immediately assaults were made into them. At the Eastern stronghold Dutch troops led by Count William of Nassau, dashed forward. The soldiers carried the ruined bastion only to find the Spanish had drawn back and opened fire on the Dutch killing and wounding many but they held what they had taken. The English assailants led by Vere rushed into the thick of the cloud of dust and mortar of the Oeningerpoort and within a few minutes they were on the parapet, fighting was brief and the English carried it with few losses. They were unable to advance any further however due to heavy fire from the Spanish troops. The third explosion also made a great breach on the Gasthuys bulwark, but here upwards of 100 of the waiting Dutch troops ready to assail were buried alive. As a result of this and the confusion they could not dash into the ruins with the necessary speed, and the Spanish were able to prepare for a solid defence and repelled the assault.

A lull in the siege then occurred during the next day and both sides prepared for the next move. This however was not to last; with the other two bastions taken the Spanish position had become untenable. On the 5th the Spanish decided to send out a flag of truce, and Coquel asked for terms ending further fighting. The surrender was soon arranged and the fighting ceased.

== Aftermath ==
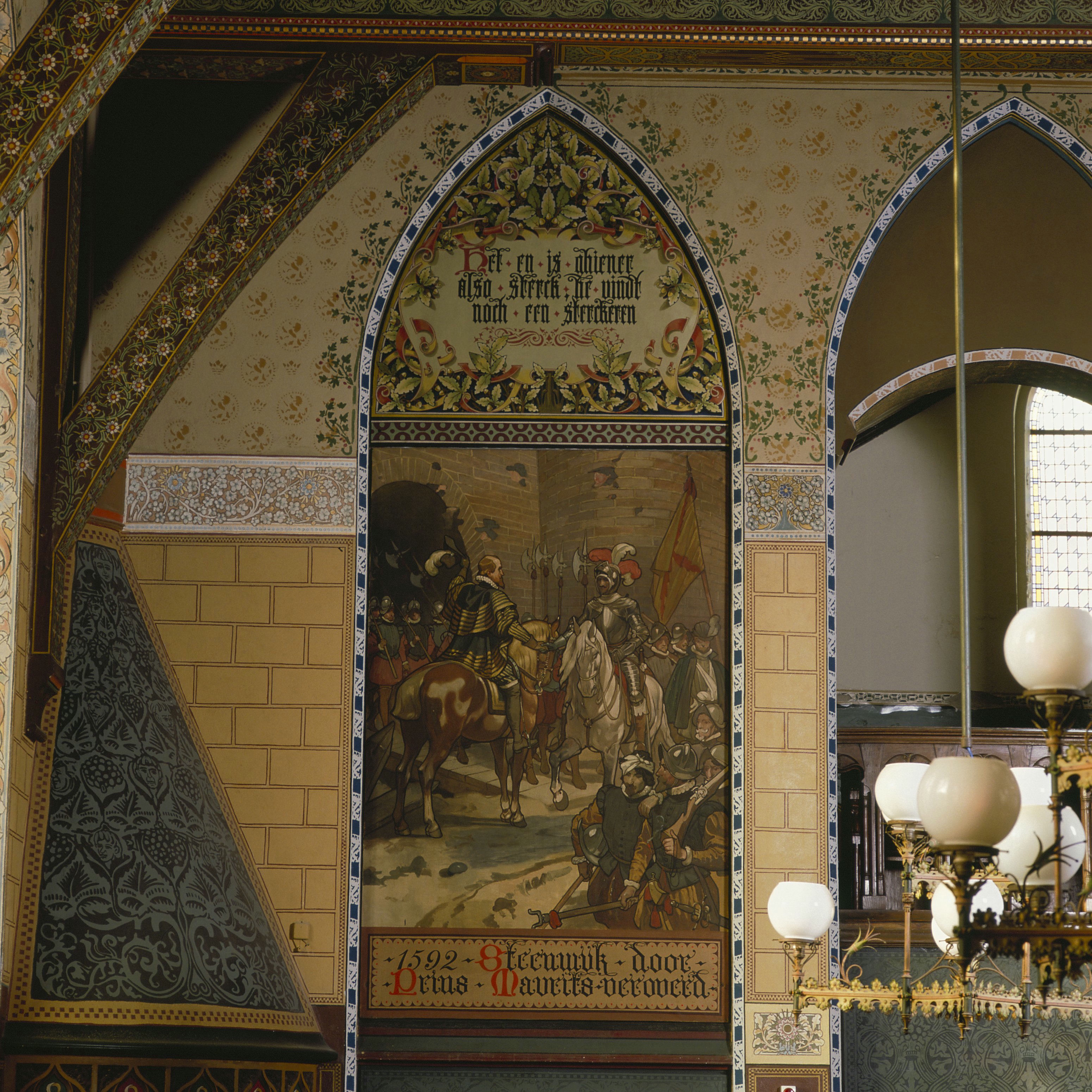
Interior of Steenwijk church showing Maurice's entry in 1592

On 5 July the garrison marched out of the city with their arms and flags. Soon after the victorious Dutch and English troops entered Steenwijk. Maurice's force had lost 600 men nearly half of these were inflicted in the failed third assault, and he was himself slightly wounded in the face. Spanish casualties were less but 800 had marched out and surrendered. Francis Vere along with his brother and Horace Vere, Sir Robert Sidney, and a few of their captains were wounded, along with 152 of their men during the assault.

By conquering Steenwijk the Spaniards were cut off from the Zuiderzee, from which the Republic's ships could then sail through safer on the inland sea. In Friesland there was great joy at news of the impregnable fortress's surrender. They rebuilt the blown bastions as well as strengthening the walls.

The siege was unique in that instead of starving the garrison out Maurice instead used his guns to scare the garrison into surrender but even failing that; digging mines and using powder to blow up bastions and the use of his own soldiers as pioneers rather than farmers or labourers to dig positions. This was a turning point in the conduct of siege warfare in that engineers greatly enhanced the success.

With Steenwijk secure the Spanish pressure in the East was relaxed and Maurice conducted training with the troops at Giethoorn learning how to turn, advance, retreat, double their lines, and so on. After which the army marched to Coevorden and after a siege there captured the city. With Groningen thus cut off from Twente, Maurice took to the field again in 1594 laid siege to Groningen, which he also captured from the Spanish.

In this period, Maurice had won large parts of the Netherlands and this in Holland is known in as the 'Ten Glory Years'.
