= Siege of Coevorden (1592) =

1592 siege

Siege of Coevorden 1592
- Part of the Eighty Years' War & the Anglo–Spanish War
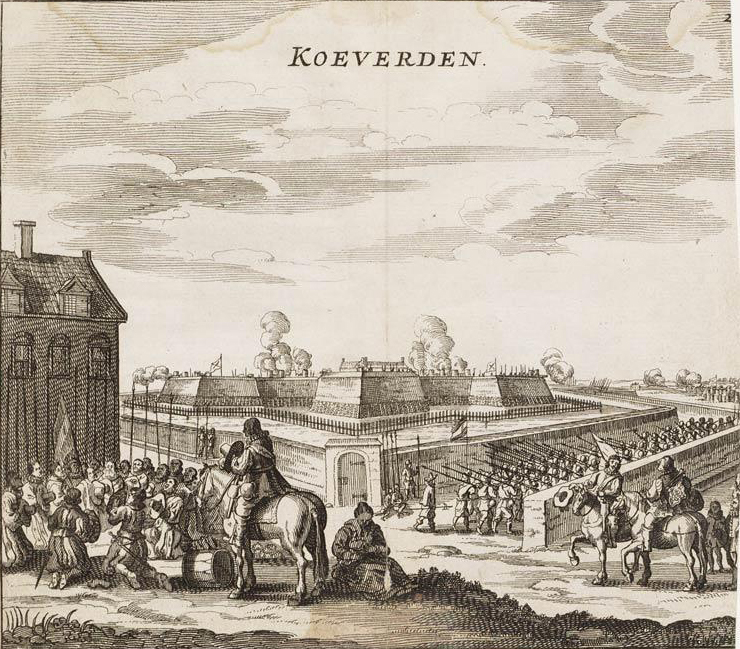
- Siege of Coevorden,1592, print by Johannes Janssonius
Date	26 July – 2 September 1592
Location	Coevorden; Present day the Netherlands
Result	Dutch and English victory

Belligerents
Dutch Republic; England	(Spain) Spanish Empire

Commanders and leaders
(Dutch Republic) Maurice of Orange (England) Francis Vere	(Spain) Frederik van den Bergh (Coevorden) (Spain) Francisco Verdugo (Spain) Cristóbal de Mondragón

Strength
8,000	1,900; 5,000 (relief)

Casualties and losses
Unknown	1,400 killed, wounded or from disease, 500 surrendered

The siege of Coevorden was a siege that took place between 26 July and 2 September 1592 during the Eighty Years' War and the Anglo–Spanish War at the city of Coevorden by a Dutch and English force under overall command of Maurice of Nassau. The city was defended by Frederik van den Bergh who had been commissioned for the defence by King Philip II of Spain.

A Spanish relief force under Francisco Verdugo and Cristóbal de Mondragón attempted to relieve the Spanish garrison. However a failed attack on the besiegers as well as desertions and disease meant the Spanish relief force had to retreat leaving Coevorden to its fate. As a result, on 2 September 1592, the garrison of Coevorden surrendered.

== Background ==
In 1591 Maurice of Orange, the Dutch Republic's military commander had led a successful campaign, in which he had captured several important cities culminating in the capture of Nijmegen in October that year. During that campaign he had also captured Delfzijl, and meant Groningen the capital of Drenthe, being stripped of its main transit port. The ultimate goal of Maurice was to take that city in 1591 but the defences looked too strong. Therefore, in 1592 he began by besieging and taking Steenwijk so that Grongingen would grow weaker.

Maurice then wanted to move immediately to Coevorden, but the States-General did not want this to proceed. Alexander Farnese, Duke of Parma, although wounded from his unsuccessful campaign in Northern France had returned to the Netherlands, near Zeeland and the States General wanted to recall Maurice there. However, the Republic's army consisting of 8,000 infantry and 2,000 cavalry was well complemented by the addition of newly-recruited German mercenaries as well as the English army under Francis Vere - fourteen companies of infantry and five troops of cavalry. Parma convalescing from his wound at the same time was in no fit condition to lead an army and the army itself was not at full strength.

Coevorden itself was an important five bastion fortress in the east of the country and lay between two large marshes; the Bourtange swamp which was thirty miles to the bay at Dollart and the other spread as far as the Zuider Zee. The only hard ground was the road heading towards Coevorden on a natural barrier of sand a half mile wide. At the time Coevorden was named as the third strongest fortress in Europe (after Antwerp and Milan), designed and built by Francesco Paciotto, the architect of the famous citadel of Antwerp. The Spanish commander Francisco Verdugo had reported to Parma and the Governor ad interim Ernst von Mansfeld the immense importance of Coevorden and claimed the city was far more important than any others that had been taken that year by the Anglo-Dutch. Verdugo having been positioned in Groenlo, prepared with the veteran Spanish general Cristóbal de Mondragón to launch a strike against any potential siege.

Maurice in the meantime conducted training with the troops at Giethoorn learning how to turn, advance, retreat and double their lines. Meanwhile Spanish pressure in the East had relaxed and on 21 July the Anglo-Dutch army with approval from States General marched to Coevorden.

== Siege ==
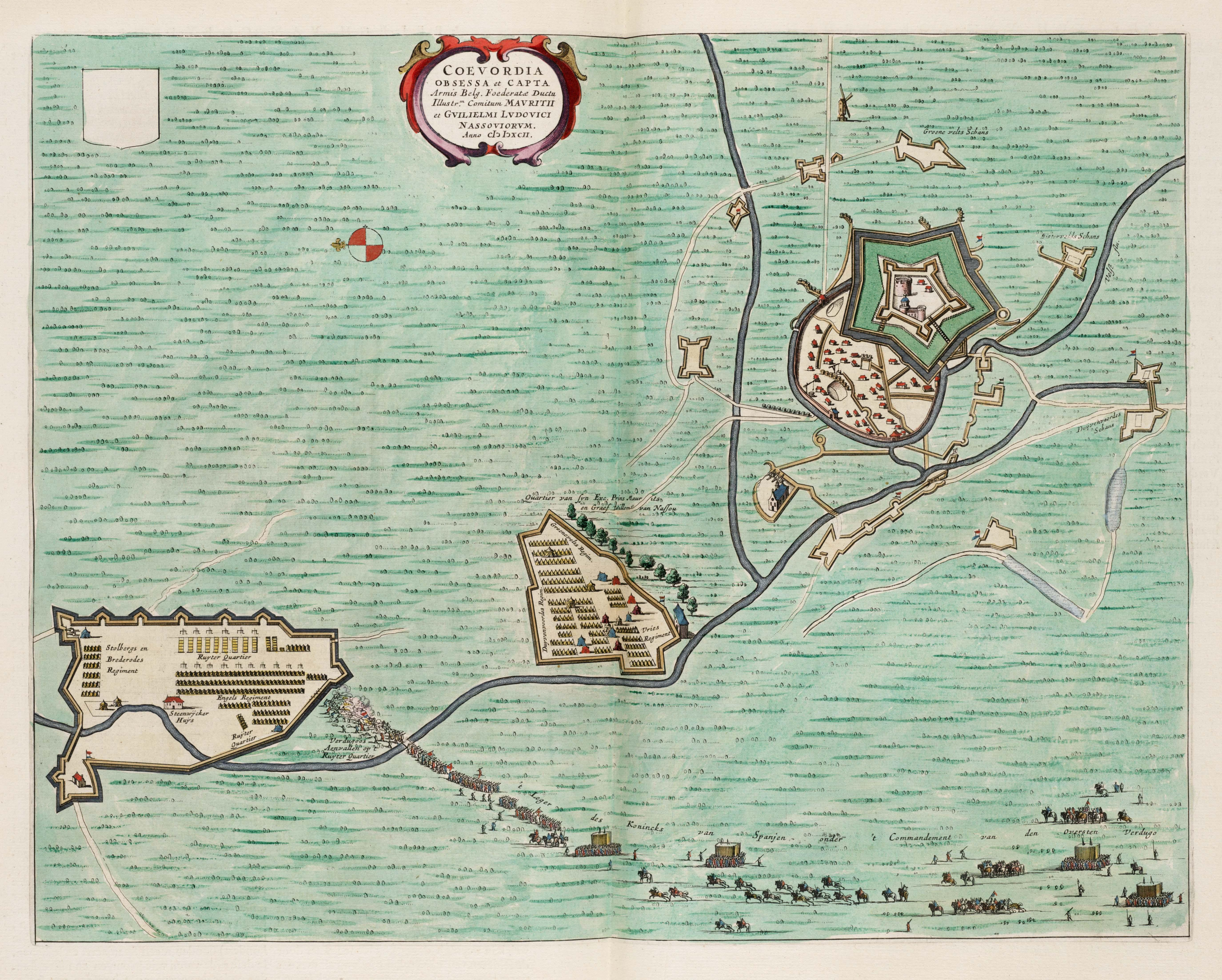
Siege of Coevorden in 1592 from the Atlas van Loon

On 26 July, Maurice's forces arrived at Coevorden and began the siege; the garrison had a thousand veterans as well as 900 militia all under the command of Frederik van den Bergh. Maurice put his cousin William Louis, Count of Nassau-Dillenburg in charge of the siege whilst he ventured to Ootmarsum to counter any relief attempt by the Spanish. Meanwhile, Francis Vere did the same with some of the English troops and fell back to Doesburg, on the IJssel river.

William Louis ordered trenches to be dug towards the fortress, and sconces to be built around the city. As a result, all the roads that were administered to the city were thus cut off from the outside. The siege lines around Coevorden were virtually complete except on the East part of city which was marshy and no siege work could be done. Engineers and pioneers were sent to the city moat so that a cover trench could be made on the fortress. Digging begun and soon the trench itself was four to five feet deep (about 1.5 meters) and twelve feet wide (approximately four meters). An attack by pioneers and soldiers on a village suburb was attempted whilst the siege lines got closer. However, the attack was repulsed by the garrison in the city, but determined, they attacked again the next day and managed to occupy the suburb.

On August 12, seeing no threat of relief Maurice returned to the siege. Mining and sapping continued for the besiegers – their pioneers and engineers constructed dams that cut off the canal which fed the ditch lines - these were dug up to it from which the water was drained. This resulted in a lack of fresh water for the garrison in the city. Some of them thought it best that they should make terms with Maurice but van den Bergh refused. He had the confidence that Francisco Verdugo together with other Spanish commanders would provide the relief of the city.

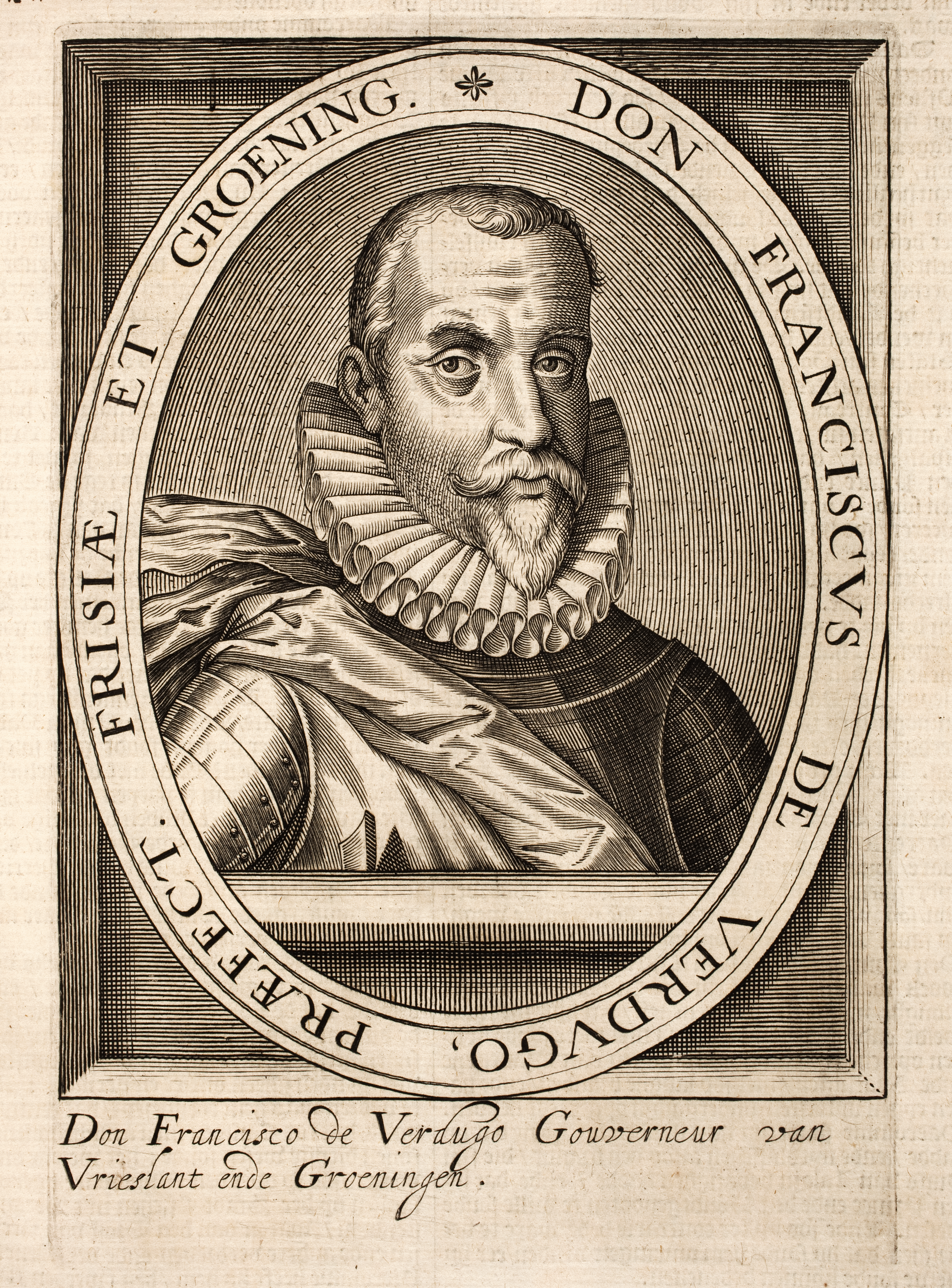
Francisco Verdugo by Hillebrant van Wouw

By mid-August wet weather had impeded operations further but for the besieging force it was thought that it would impede any army of relief.

=== Relief ===
After learning of the besiegers fragile communication lines, Verdugo and Mondragón's force marched from Groenlo with a relief force to Coevorden. By August 23 the veteran Tercio regiments of Mondragon, Gonzaga, Mansfield, and Arenburg; a force of 5,000 men had crossed the Rhine at Rheinberg. By 3 September, Verdugo's force was within a league of the city at Emblichen, having reached within ten miles of Coevorden. News reached Maurice of this force soon after, and he prepared for a confrontation with Verdugo, and as a result several forts were built in strategic places around the siege positions. The city was informed of the relief force by the distant lighting of the fires and torches. Part of Vere's English army meanwhile had also heard of Verdugo's relief; they broke camp at Doesburg and immediately marched back to Coevorden.

Verdugo decided to launch a camisado, an attack on the camp at night with the Spanish soldiers dressed in white shirts without their armour so that they couldn't be distinguished in the night. Just before daybreak, the Spanish assaulted one of the besiegers' camps which was under Count Hohenlo's command. Barely before the fight had begun however, English soldiers under Vere struck at the Spanish assault ranging within cannon-shot of the trenches just as some of the Dutch were falling back. Vere having arrived just in time, led an assault whilst the Spanish attacked saving a critical situation - Count John of Nassau-Siegen, writing to his father, said:

"Vere fought with the Spanish like a man. He came up half an hour after the fight began.

Soon after the English arrived, the Dutch joined in on the assailants who eventually were thrown back. The Dutch and English had suffered fifty casualties, including William Louis who was wounded in the abdomen, but the wound was not as serious as was first thought. Verdugo having been repulsed and having lost 300 men, then tried to attempt to enter into an open field pitched battle with Maurice. Maurice refused to be tempted there, and the sapping and mining continued followed by a heavy bombardment.

Van den Bergh had to undermine a wall, and behind it in desperation a new wall was built which caused some surprise, but for the Dutch and English it had little effect. Verdugo could not force his way past the tough Anglo-Dutch resistance; disease was high among his troops and had a high desertion rate meant that he could not make a further attempt to relieve the place. Verdugo then tried to starve the surrounding area so as to make sure the town held out longer but the besiegers themselves however, had ensured a sufficient supply of food and ammunition. Verdugo and Mondragón' could not attempt any further actions that could save Coevorden and to save losses of his own troops he therefore ordered a retreat.

When Van den Bergh noted that the relief force no longer attempted to relieve the city, he sent a drummer to Maurice with the request for negotiations of terms of surrender Van den Bergh had prepared various conditions, most of which were granted and thus Coevorden was surrendered to Maurice.

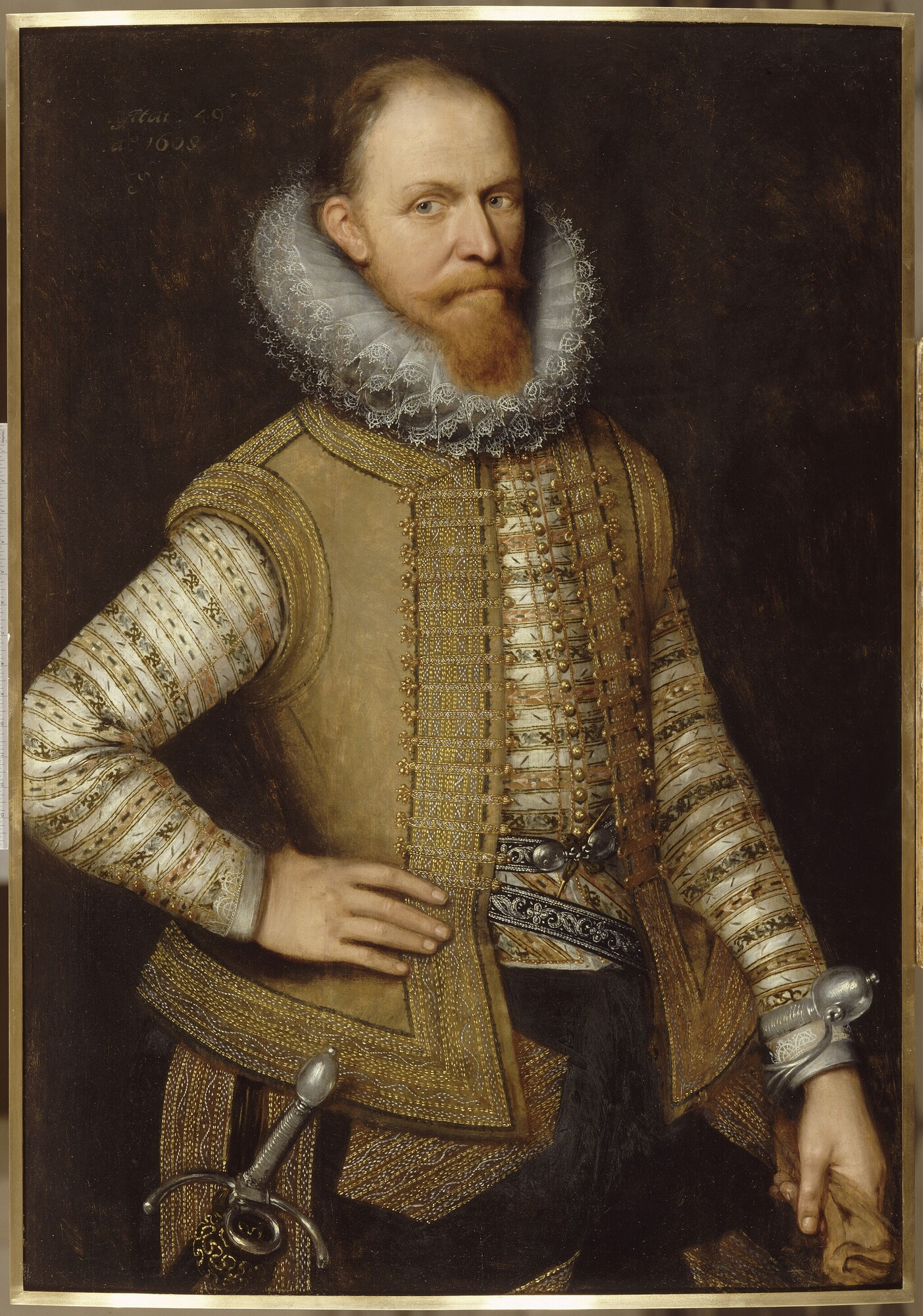
Maurice of Nassau, by Michiel Jansz. van Mierevelt

== Aftermath ==
The garrison was allowed to leave with full honours of war and could go wherever they wanted. Soon after the victorious Anglo-Dutch troops marched in but were too weak to enable any further sieges for the rest of the year. The army went into winter quarters and news of the Duke of Parma's death was received in the camp.

During the greater part of the winter Vere shipped off companies which he had drilled and trained, to serve under other commanders in France and Ireland. Still there were 4,000 effective English and Scots troops in all of the Netherlands on 1 January 1593.

After the conquests of Steenwijk and Coevorden by the States, Frisian troops demanded that Groningen should be besieged. The army of Maurice moved on to Groningen but the States-General had decided otherwise to press on to Geertruidenberg; the Frisians, as a sign of protest, sent no troops to the siege but regardless the Spanish garrison there surrendered after a three-month siege.

Groningen fell finally on May 6, 1594 after a siege by Maurice and Vere. The whole period of these victories under Maurice took place in the era known as the Ten Glory Years.

== Bibliography ==
- Black, Jeremy (2005). European Warfare, 1494-1660 Warfare and History. Routledge. ISBN 9781134477081.
- Borman, Tracy (1997). Sir Francis Vere in the Netherlands, 1589-1603: A Re-evaluation of His Career as Sergeant Major General of Elizabeth I's Troops. University of Hull.
- Duffy, Christopher (2013). Siege Warfare: The Fortress in the Early Modern World 1494-1660 Volume 1 of Siege Warfare. Routledge. ISBN 9781136607875.
- Fissel, Mark Charles (2001). English warfare, 1511–1642; Warfare and history. London, UK: Routledge. ISBN 978-0-415-21481-0.
- Jaques, Tony (2006). Dictionary of Battles and Sieges: A Guide to 8500 Battles from Antiquity Through the Twenty-first Century. Greenwood Press. ISBN 978-0313335365.
- León, Fernando González de (2009). The Road to Rocroi: Class, Culture and Command in the Spanish Army of Flanders, 1567-1659. BRILL. ISBN 9789004170827.
- MacCaffrey, Wallace T (1994). Elizabeth I: War and Politics, 1588-1603. Princeton Paperbacks Princeton University Press. ISBN 9780691036519.
- Markham, C. R. (2007). The Fighting Veres: Lives Of Sir Francis Vere And Sir Horace Vere. Kessinger Publishing. ISBN 978-1432549053.
- Naphy, William G. (2011). The Protestant Revolution: From Martin Luther to Martin Luther King Jr. Random House. ISBN 9781446416891.
- van Nimwegen, Olaf (2010). The Dutch Army and the Military Revolutions, 1588-1688 Volume 31 of Warfare in History Series. Boydell & Brewer. ISBN 9781843835752.
- Wernham, Richard Bruce (1984). After the Armada: Elizabethan England and the Struggle for Western Europe, 1588-1595. Clarendon Press. ISBN 9780198227533.
- van der Hoeven, Marco (1997). Exercise of Arms: Warfare in the Netherlands, 1568-1648, Volume 1. Brill. ISBN 9789004107274.
