= Siege of Deventer (1578) =

By George van Lalaing, better known as the count of Rennenberg

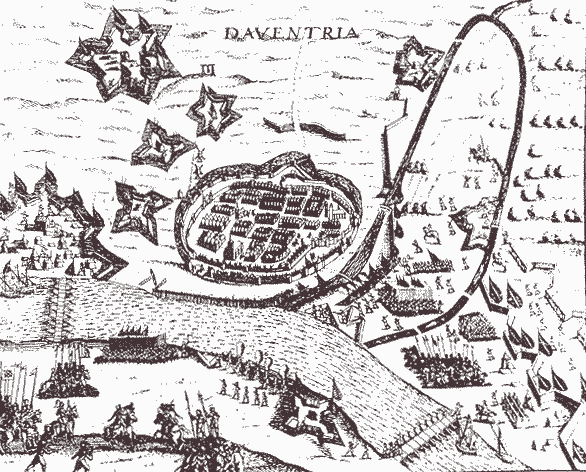
Date	3 August – 19 November 1578
Location	{{{location}}}
Result	States-General victory
Territorial changes	Deventer captured by the States

Belligerents
(Dutch Republic) States-General	Spain

Commanders and leaders
Graaf van Rennenberg; Diederik Sonoy	Augustyn Ryck; Haurincourt

Strength
Army of Rennenberg: 10 detachments (around 1,300); French army: 1,000	900

Casualties and losses
Unknown	300

The siege of Deventer was a siege of the city of Deventer by States troops under George van Lalaing, count of Rennenberg, from 3 August to 19 November 1578 during the Eighty Years' War. It was besieged in an attempt by the States-General of the Netherlands to better protect the regions of Holland and Utrecht from Spanish plundering. Since 1572 the city had been held by the German Polweiler-regiment for the Spanish Empire on behalf of Don John of Austria. After Lalaing had put into practice a number of pieces of strategic advice from Johan van den Kornput, the city was prepared to negotiate a surrender and on 19 November 1578 handed itself over to States troops.
