= Siege of Steenwijk (1580–1581) =

1580 siege

- Part of the Eighty Years' War
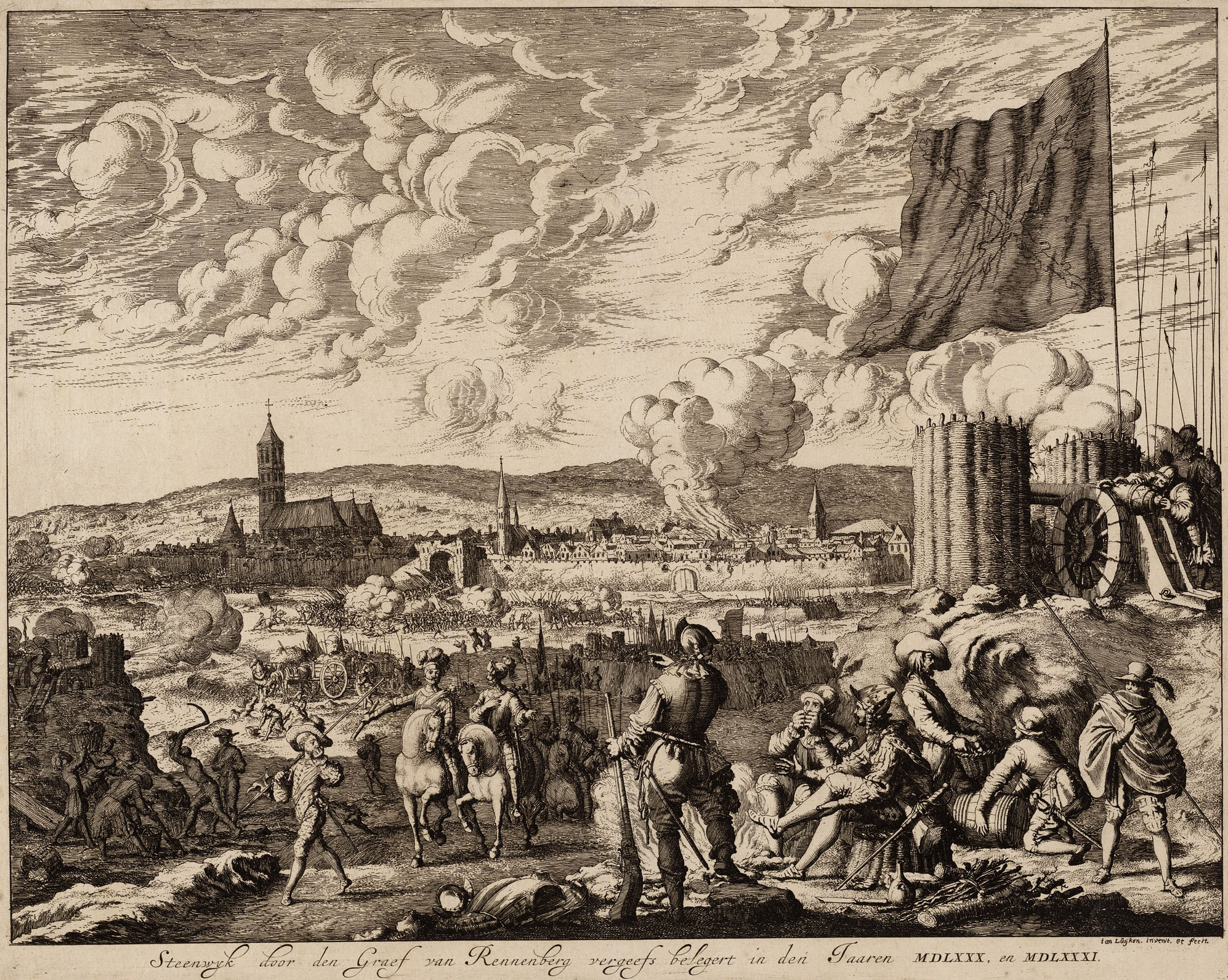
- The failed Spanish siege of Steenwijk under Count Rennenberg in 1580/1581, by Jan Luyken
Date	October 18, 1580 – February 23, 1581
Location	Steenwijk (present-day Netherlands)
Result	States-General victory

Belligerents
(Dutch Republic) States-General	Spain

Commanders and leaders
(Dutch Republic) Johan van den Kornput (Dutch Republic) John Norreys	(Spain) George van Lalaing

Strength
600 men	6,000 infantry, 1,200 cavalry

Casualties and losses
Unknown	Heavy

The siege of Steenwijk took place from October 18, 1580 – February 23, 1581 during the Eighty Years' War, between a besieging Spanish force under turncoat George van Lalaing against a Dutch garrison at Steenwijk under Johan van den Kornput. A Dutch force under John Norreys successfully relieved the town on January 24, and the Spanish in addition to ill-health and lack of supplies subsequently lifted the siege in February.

== Background ==
In March 1577, the Spanish brought a contingent of soldiers from Wallonia to maintain their rule in the rebellious province of Overijssel. In March 1580, amidst outrage amongst the Protestant Dutch over the betrayal of George van Lalaing (Count of Rennenberg and former Stadholder of Groningen) - who had turned to be in the service of Spain - the occupation force, their wages overdue, went over to the side of the Dutch forces.

The province of Overijssel only had a small number of Dutch troops—a company of soldiers led by Captain Olthof—but in October a second company led by Johan van den Kornput and consisting of 600 soldiers arrived at Steenwijk. In 1578, Kornput had provided vital strategic assistance to Lalaing (before his betrayal) during the siege of Deventer. Subsequently, the city was forced to surrender and came into States hands.

== Siege ==
On October 18, 1580, the day after Kornput arrived in Steenwijk, a Spanish army of over 6,000 infantry and 1,200 cavalry under Lalaing laid siege to Steenwijk.

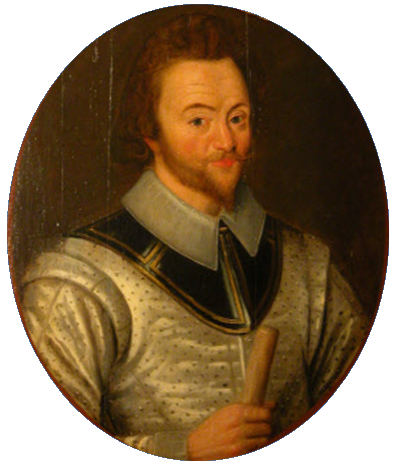
John Norreys

A bombardment in November destroyed about seventy houses, testing the city residents, who were already suffering because the harvest that year had been poor. Two relief attempts by the Dutch were frustrated by the besiegers in late November. The Dutch Republican forces then asked John Norreys, who was in Brabant, to help relieve the beleaguered garrison. Promoted to the rank of general officer, Norreys marched to Steenwijk with two thousand men.

Norreys arrived before Steenwijk on December 15, but the relief column was immediately attacked by the Spanish. In a general engagement along the banks of the Vledder Aa, the English and Dutch repelled the attackers. The defeated Spanish fled, leaving behind much armor and other equipment. Seizing the advantage, Norreys then broke through the besiegers' entrenchments and supplied and reinforced the town. This relief, albeit temporary, was the turning point.

As the siege took place in winter, the besiegers and besieged suffered severely from the cold weather. The city canal and Vledder Aa froze over several times, causing problems, such as soldiers and guns falling through the ice while attempting to cross. A surprise sally on January 24 by Norreys and his men proved decisive. They captured equipment, broke up many of the Spanish siege guns, and inflicted casualties of nearly 400 men (most of whom were captured).

On February 23, 1581, the situation for the besiegers was desperate. Many, including Lalaing, were ill from exposure. With supplies and ammunition running low, Lalaing could not sit out the winter months or gain ground. He gave up the siege and retreated with his men.

== Aftermath ==
Steenwijk persisted during the four-month siege due to the decisive actions of captain Johan van den Kornput and the relief supplies brought by Captain Norreys, which helped the city fight off the threat of disease. The Spanish force suffered another defeat at Kollum in July, when they were pursued and defeated by Norrey's troops, leading to the death of Lalaing. He was buried in the Martini Church in Groningen.

In November 1582, the Spaniards, led by Juan Baptista de Tasis, returned. Steenwijk was soon overcome and the remaining Protestants fled the city. Steenwijk, now a Spanish stronghold, had only fifty of its original inhabitants. Only Zeeland, Utrecht, and Friesland remained in Dutch rebel hands. In a short time the Spanish army, now led by Anthonie de Coquele, was expanded to over 1,000 men, including Spaniards, Italians, Walloons, and Burgundians.

On May 28, 1592, Prince Maurice of Orange amassed an army of 8,000 men and reconquered much of the States. All roads to and from Steenwijk were closed and the city was once again placed under siege. On July 5, 1592, after a fierce 44-day battle, the Spaniards surrendered. By this time Steenwijk was almost entirely in ruins. It was not until 1597, after a failed attack by the Spanish under Count Frederik van den Bergh, that the Council of State found the resources to reconstruct the defenses and the city.
