= Francisco Verdugo =

Don Francisco Verdugo
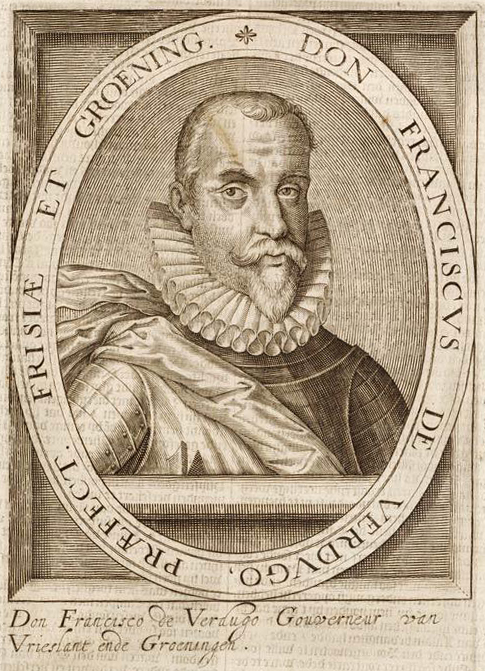
- A portrait of Francisco Verdugo engraved by Hillebrant van Wouw
- Born: 1537; Talavera de la Reina
- Died: 22 September 1595 (aged 57–58); Antwerp
- Military career
- Allegiance: Spanish Habsburg
- Branch: Army of Flanders
- Service years: 1566–1595
- Rank: Maestre de Campo
- Commands: Governor and Captain-General of Friesland and Groningen
- Conflicts: Battle of St. Quentin (1557); Siege of Haarlem (1572–73); Battle of Noordhorn (1581); Battle of Boksum (1586); Battle of Zutphen (1586); Reduction of Groningen (1594)
- Other work: Commentario de la guerra de Frisa

Francisco Verdugo (1537–1595), Spanish military commander in the Dutch Revolt, became Maestre de Campo General, in the Spanish Netherlands. He was also the last Spanish Stadtholder of Friesland, Groningen, Drenthe and Overijssel between 1581 and 1594.

== Biography ==
He has been described as a brave, courteous and very experienced soldier, who rose from the rank of musketeer, which he held at the siege of Haarlem, to the governor of Frisia.

When he was 20 he participated in the Battle of Saint-Quentin in August 1557.

Nominated Governor of Haarlem in 1573, as an Admiral of the Spanish Fleet he helped to conquer Flanders. In 1576, he became Councillor of State.

After the arrival in Brussels in 1577 of Juan of Austria, (1547–1578, aged 31), the half brother of King Philip II of Spain, Verdugo was promoted to Governor of Breda, and later of Thionville and of the Citadel of Namur. He married in 1578, aged 41, Dorothea von Mansfeld, one of the daughters of Count Peter Ernst I von Mansfeld-Vorderort (1517–1604).

In 1578 he was despatched to Friesland in support of the governor of the province, George de Lalaing, and in 1581 he in turn was appointed Governor and Captain General of the Dutch provinces of Friesland, Groningen, Drenthe and Overijssel. This year he won the Battle of Noordhorn over a Dutch States' army led by the English general John Norreys. In 1582 he was forced to lift the siege of Lochem upon that city's relief. In 1586 he successfully commanded Spanish forces at the Battle of Zutphen. But from then on, he lost more and more terrain to Maurice of Nassau, Prince of Orange and William Louis, Count of Nassau-Dillenburg until by 1595, he had only the city of Groningen and Twente left. He was unable to prevent Coevorden from surrendering in September 1592. In an effort to retake the city the following year he was forced to withdraw after an Anglo-Dutch relief force arrived. Finally he was also unable to prevent Groningen from falling on 22 July 1594, and was thus recalled from Friesland by Archduke Ernest of Austria.

After his recall he wrote a Commentario de la guerra de Frisa justifying his actions. There were plans to appoint him governor of the citadel at Antwerp at the time of his death.

He died on 22 September 1595 and was buried in the same grave as his wife, in the Convent of Sancti Spiritus (Orden de Santa Clara) in Luxembourg.
