= George de Lalaing, Count of Rennenberg =

Stadtholder of Philip II of Spain, 1577–1581

George de Lalaing Count of Rennenbergh
- Lalaing coat of arms
- Born: c. 1550; Hoogstraten
- Died: 23 July 1581; Groningen
- Buried: Martinikerk
- Noble family: House of Lalaing
- Father: Philip de Lalaing
- Mother: Anna of Rennenberg

George de Lalaing count Rennenberg (c. 1550 – 23 July 1581), was stadtholder of Friesland, Groningen, Drenthe and Overijssel in the service of Philip II of Spain from 1577 to 1581. The Lalaing family came from Hainaut and had a tradition of governing. His father was Philip de Lalaing, count of Hoogstraten; his mother, Anna of Rennenberg.

== Life ==
He was born around 1550, probably in Hoogstraten Castle (Gelmelslot) in the Campine. Rennenberg (as he was known in the Netherlands) was appointed stadtholder of the Northern provinces by the States General of the Netherlands after the Pacification of Ghent in 1577, on a proposal from William of Orange. He allowed a number of important reforms in Friesland, such as the introduction of the Gedeputeerde Staten (Delegated States), and the forming of a fourth quarter in the States of Friesland to represent the eleven Frisian cities. He was a firm believer in the Pacification of Ghent as a means to reconcile the rebellious Calvinists with their Catholic king. When the treaty resulted in Protestantism gaining ground, notably in Brussels, Ghent and Bruges, he abandoned the cause of the rebels for the king on 3 March 1580, with the support of the city of Groningen, according to tradition convinced by his sister Cornelia van Lalaing. The rest of the province remained loyal to the rebel cause. He attempted to besiege Steenwijk but had to raise the siege once John Norreys arrived and relieved the place. He was then further defeated by Norreys at Kollum. Rennenberg, already ill, died at Groningen on 23 July 1581 and was buried in the Groningen Martinikerk. The city remained the scene of military action until 1594. Rennenberg's defection polarized the Dutch population further along religious lines. In the rebel provinces, Catholics would no longer be trusted with high posts.
