= Ten Years (Eighty Years' War) =

Fifth phase of the Eighty Years' War

Conquests made by Maurice in his 1597 campaign

The Ten Years (Dutch: Tien jaren) were a period in the Eighty Years' War spanning the years 1588 to 1598. During this period, the forces of the Dutch Republic under stadtholder Maurice of Nassau, his cousin William Louis, Count of Nassau-Dillenburg, the stadtholder of Friesland, and the English general Francis Vere won a series of campaigns against the Spanish Empire. These campaigns brought much of the north and east of the Habsburg Netherlands under Republican control.

Beginning with the relief of Bergen op Zoom in 1588, Maurice and William Louis subsequently captured Breda in 1590; Zutphen, Deventer, Delfzijl, and Nijmegen in 1591; Steenwijk and Coevorden in 1592; Geertruidenberg in 1593; Groningen in 1594; and Grol, Enschede, Ootmarsum, and Oldenzaal in 1597. Many of these territories had been previously lost to the Spanish in the 1580s.

Historians have also associated Maurice's campaigns during this period with reforms in siege warfare and military organisation, and with the consolidation of the Republic's position in the northern Netherlands.

== Historiography ==
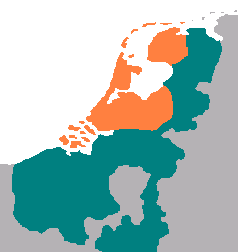
Territory of the United Provinces c. 1590 (orange), at the height of the Spanish Reconquest under Parma (turquoise).

The term "Ten Years" was coined in 1857 or 1858 by Robert Fruin, the first professor of Dutch national history (Dutch: Vaderlandsche Geschiedenis) at Leiden University, through his book Tien jaren uit den Tachtigjarigen Oorlog. 1588–1598 ("Ten Years from the Eighty Years' War. 1588–1598"). In the work, he wanted to show how the situation in the Netherlands changed completely between 1588 ("when the cause of the Dutch revolt seemed all but lost") and 1598 (when "the northern provinces, the glorious Seven, are liberated for good, prosperous on land and sea ... But Spain, which had falsely believed itself to have already mastered the rebellious provinces, is tired and exhausted of fighting"). In these years, Maurice's military achievements, as well as the young Republic's political conflicts and diplomatic missions, enabled the Netherlands to make their decisive step towards independence, and Holland and Zeeland to seize a leading role in global trade. Praising the enterprising spirit and independence of the small new state, Fruin also emphasised that this breakthrough would have been impossible without the bulk of the Spanish army under Alexander Farnese, Duke of Parma being tied up in France. The book became a great success, "one of the classics of 19th-century historiography", and was reprinted five times while Fruin was still alive.

British historian of Dutch history Jonathan Israel (1989) essentially agreed with Fruin's economic conclusions, writing that the emergence of Dutch dominance in global commerce was not a gradual process, but a rather sudden boom from 1590 to 1609, while Dutch (Hollandic) trade had still been stagnant in the 1580s. Gelderblom (2000) conceded that the Hollandic merchants did not gain a foothold in Russia, the Mediterranean and outside Europe until the 1590s, but pointed out that economic developments in the first half of the 16th century already laid an important foundation for later success (which both Fruin and Israel agreed on), and challenged them by arguing that in the 10-year period following the Alteratie (1578–1588), the city of Amsterdam already began flourishing, in part due to the influx of merchants and artisans fleeing from the Southern Netherlands, especially after the 1585 Fall of Antwerp (a point supported by other historians). Anton van der Lem (2019) concurred with Fruin that the Ten Years were militarily 'crucial', although it had more to do with the absence of Parma than the brilliance of the Republic's war efforts and economics.

== Background ==
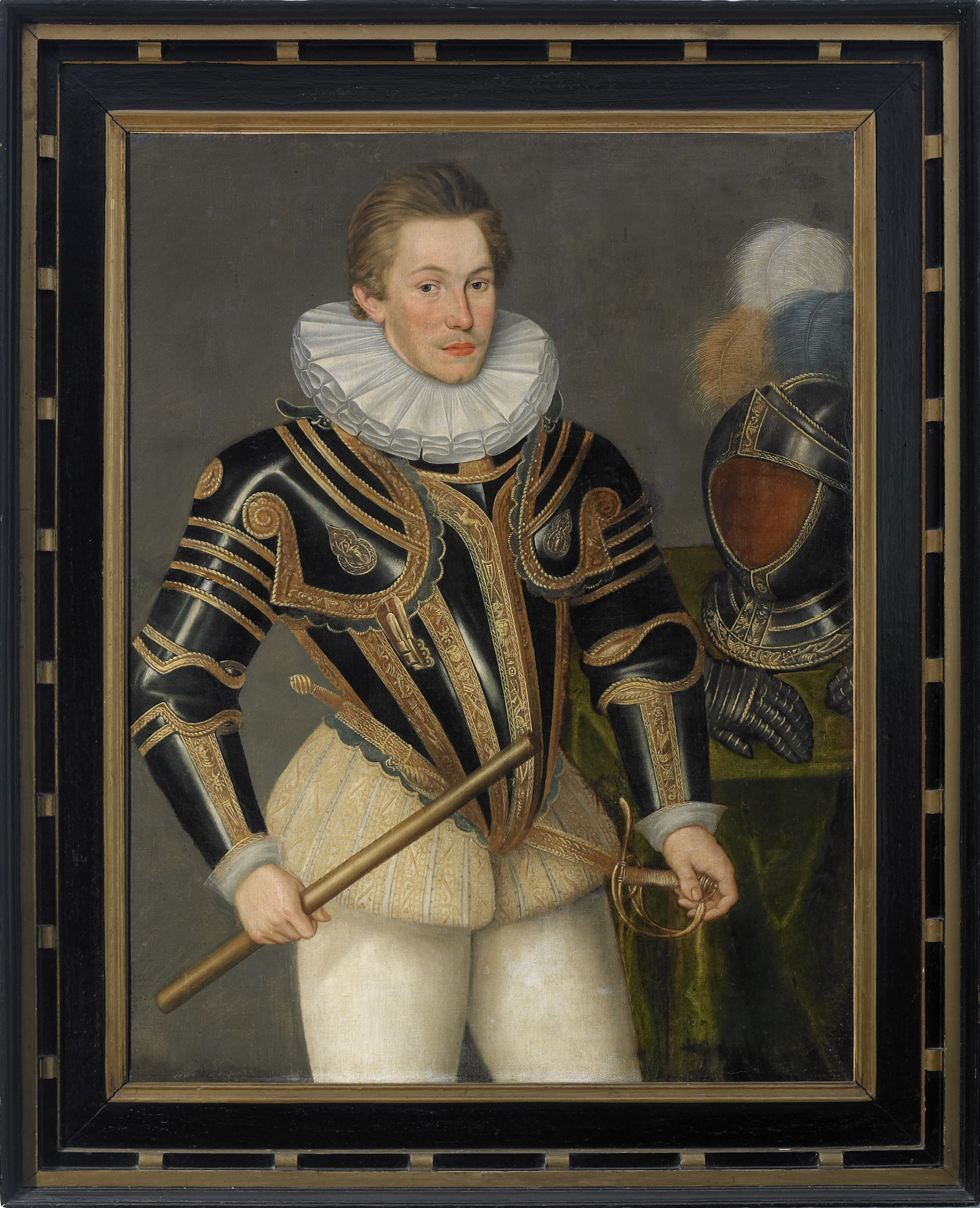
Maurice, stadtholder of Holland and Zeeland (1588)

The new republic strongly increased its trade and wealth from 1585 onwards, with Amsterdam replacing Antwerp as the main port of north-west Europe (see #Economics and demographic changes in the Netherlands).

After several failed attempts at finding a suitable regent to replace Philip II (Matthias of Austria 1577–1581, Francis of Anjou 1581–1583, William "the Silent" of Orange 1583–1584), the Dutch revolutionaries sought to establish an alliance with England by inviting Robert Dudley, 1st Earl of Leicester in December 1585. Within a year of his arrival, Leicester had lost much of his public support by banning trade with the Southern Netherlands, siding with the radical Calvinists and banning moderates from Utrecht, who turned to the regenten in Holland. Leicester returned to England in December 1586, making a brief but unpopular reappearance from June to December 1587, during which he staged a failed coup d'état by occupying several Hollandic towns. Meanwhile, the States of Holland and Zeeland had appointed Maurice of Nassau (William of Orange's son) as stadtholder in on his 18th birthday November 1585. In March 1587, he was also appointed commander of the Hollandic and Zeelandic troops. (see #Politics of the Dutch Republic).

Under the two stadtholders, Maurice and William Louis, the Dutch army was in a short time thoroughly reformed from an ill-disciplined, ill-paid rabble of mercenary companies from all over Protestant Europe, to a well-disciplined, well-paid professional army, with many soldiers, skilled in the use of modern fire-arms, like arquebuses, and soon the more modern muskets. The use of these fire-arms required tactical innovations like the counter-march of files of musketeers to enable rapid volley fire by ranks; such complicated manoevres had to be instilled by constant drilling. These reforms were later emulated by other European armies in the 17th century (see #Dutch military reforms).

== Military operations ==
=== 1588: The Spanish Armada ===
Externally, the preparations Philip was making for an invasion of England were all too evident. This growing threat prompted Elizabeth to take a more neutral stance in the Netherlands. Johan van Oldenbarnevelt proceeded unhindered to break the opposition. Elizabeth appreciated that she needed Dutch naval co-operation to defeat the threatened invasion and that opposing Oldenbarnevelt's policies, or supporting his enemies, was unlikely to get it. The position of Holland was also improved when Adolf of Nieuwenaar died in a gunpowder explosion in October 1589, enabling Oldenbarnevelt to engineer his succession as stadtholder of Utrecht, Gelderland and Overijssel by Maurice, with whom he worked hand in glove.

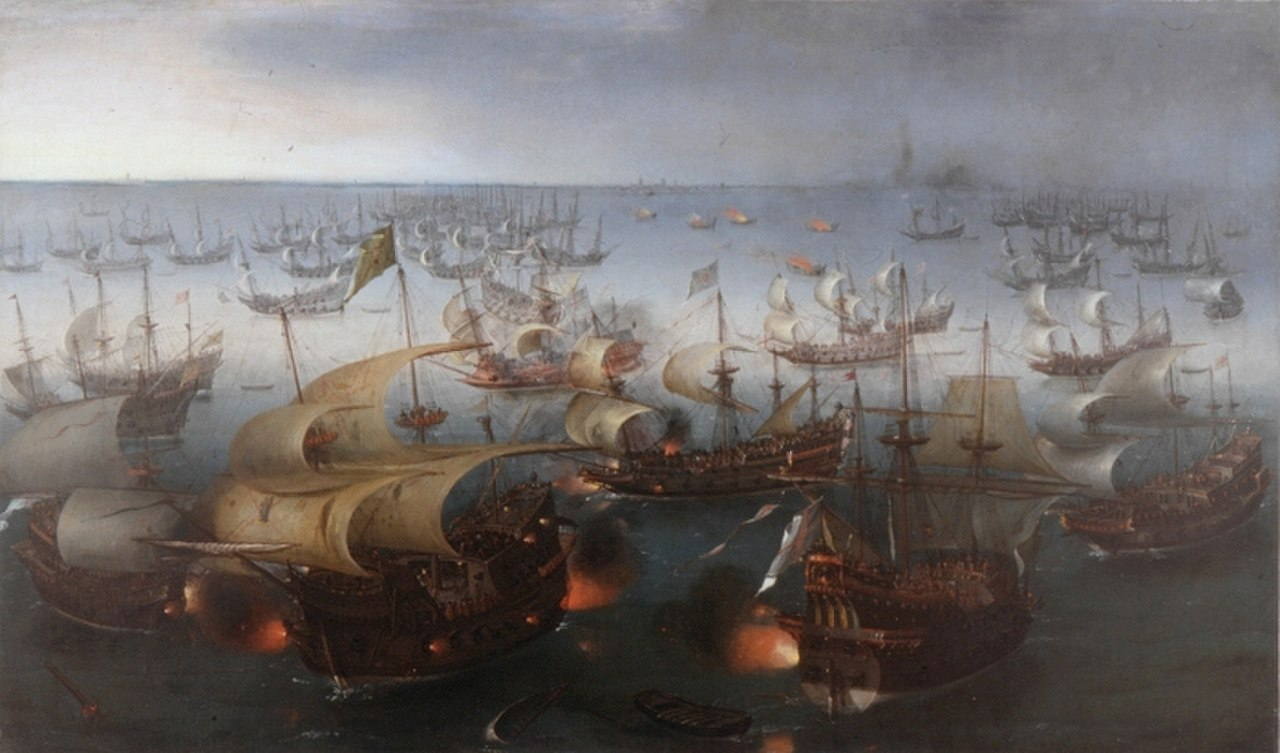
The Spanish armada by Hendrick Cornelisz Vroom

The role of the budding Dutch navy in the defeat of the Spanish Armada in August 1588 was crucial. After the fall of Antwerp the Sea-Beggar veterans under admiral Justinus van Nassau (the illegitimate elder brother of Maurice) had been blockading Antwerp and the Flemish coast with their nimble flyboats. These mainly operated in the shallow waters off Zeeland and Flanders that larger warships with a deeper draught, like the Spanish and English galleons, could not safely enter. The Dutch therefore enjoyed unchallenged naval superiority in these waters, even though their navy was inferior in naval armament. An essential element of the plan of invasion, as it was eventually implemented, was the transportation of a large part of Parma's Army of Flanders as the main invasion force in unarmed barges across the English Channel. These barges would be protected by the large ships of the Armada. However, to get to the Armada, they would have to cross the zone dominated by the Dutch navy, where the Armada could not go. This problem seems to have been overlooked by the Spanish planners, but it was insurmountable. Because of this obstacle, England never was in any real danger. However, as it turned out, the English navy defeated the Armada before the embarkation of Parma's army could be implemented, turning the role of the Dutch moot. The Army of Flanders escaped the drowning death Justinus and his men had in mind for them, ready to fight another day.

=== 1589 ===
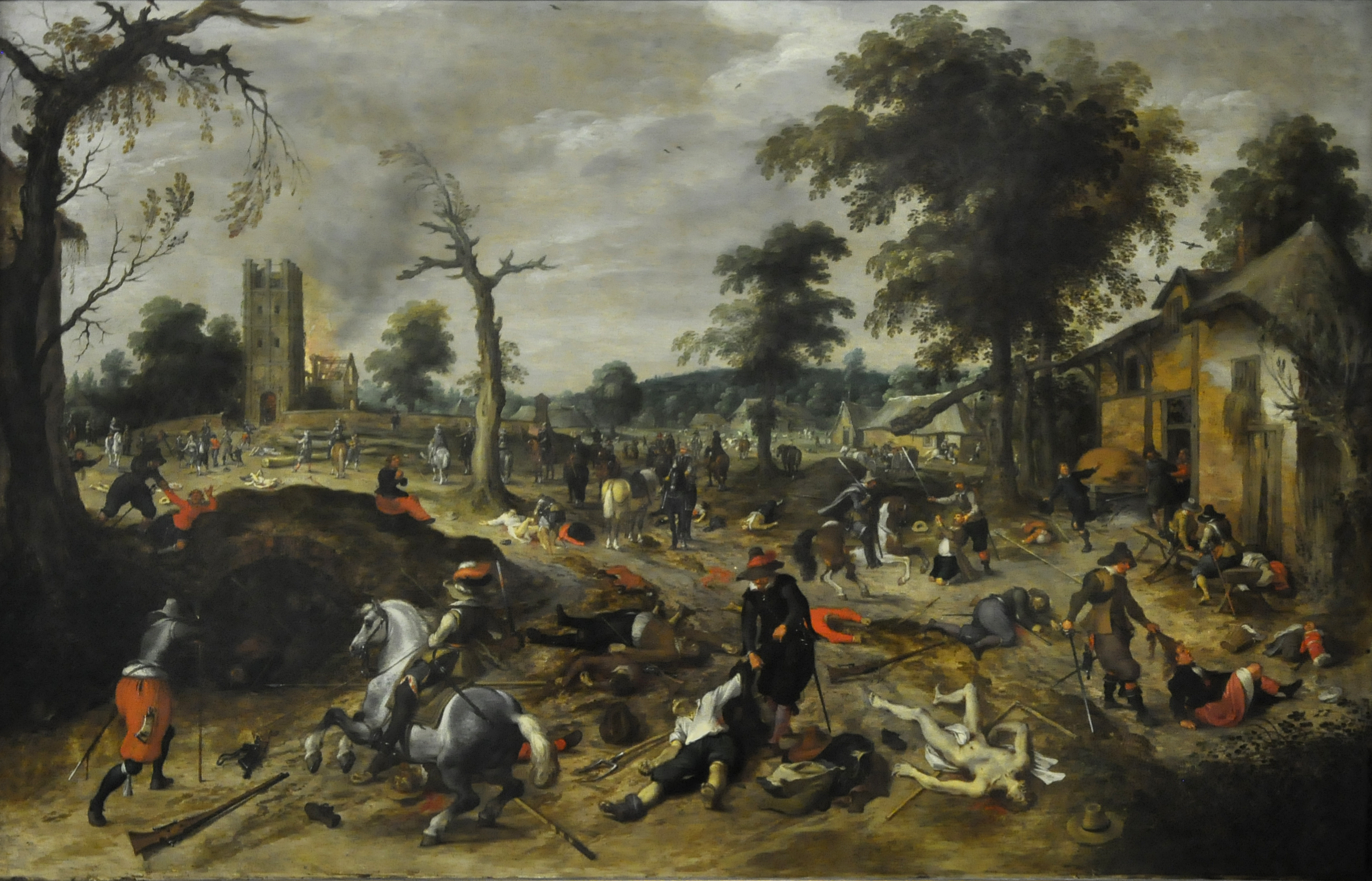
The aftermath of the plundering of the village of Wommelgem in 1589

The War of the Three Henrys reached its climax on 1 August 1589 with the assassination of Henry III, leaving the Huguenot Henry of Navarre as the only plausible candidate for the throne. However, the succession of Henry IV occasioned still more civil war, as the Catholic League utterly rejected him. On 7 September 1589, Philip II of Spain ordered Parma, the commander of the Army of Flanders, to move all available forces south to prevent Henry's accession. For Spain, the Netherlands had become a sideshow in comparison to the French conflict, as Philip feared the possibility of a Protestant France emerging between Spain and the Low Countries. Philip's intervention on the French Catholic side offered the Dutch rebels a respite from Parma's relentless pressure.

When Adolf van Nieuwenaar died in a gunpowder explosion in October 1589, Oldenbarnevelt engineered Maurice to be appointed stadtholder of Utrecht, Guelders and Overijssel. Oldenbarnevelt managed to wrest power away from the Council of State, with its English members (though the Council would have an English representation until the English loans were repaid by the end of the reign of James I). Instead, military decisions were more and more made by the States-General (with its preponderant influence of the Holland delegation), thereby usurping important executive functions from the Council.

Meanwhile, the Frisian stadtholder William Louis travelled to The Hague twice in 1589, both times in order to plead with the States-General to enlarge the States Army and switch from defensive to offensive warfare. The States were initially wary, unsure whether Farnese was really concentrating his efforts on France and would not turn and surprise the rebels.

=== 1590 ===
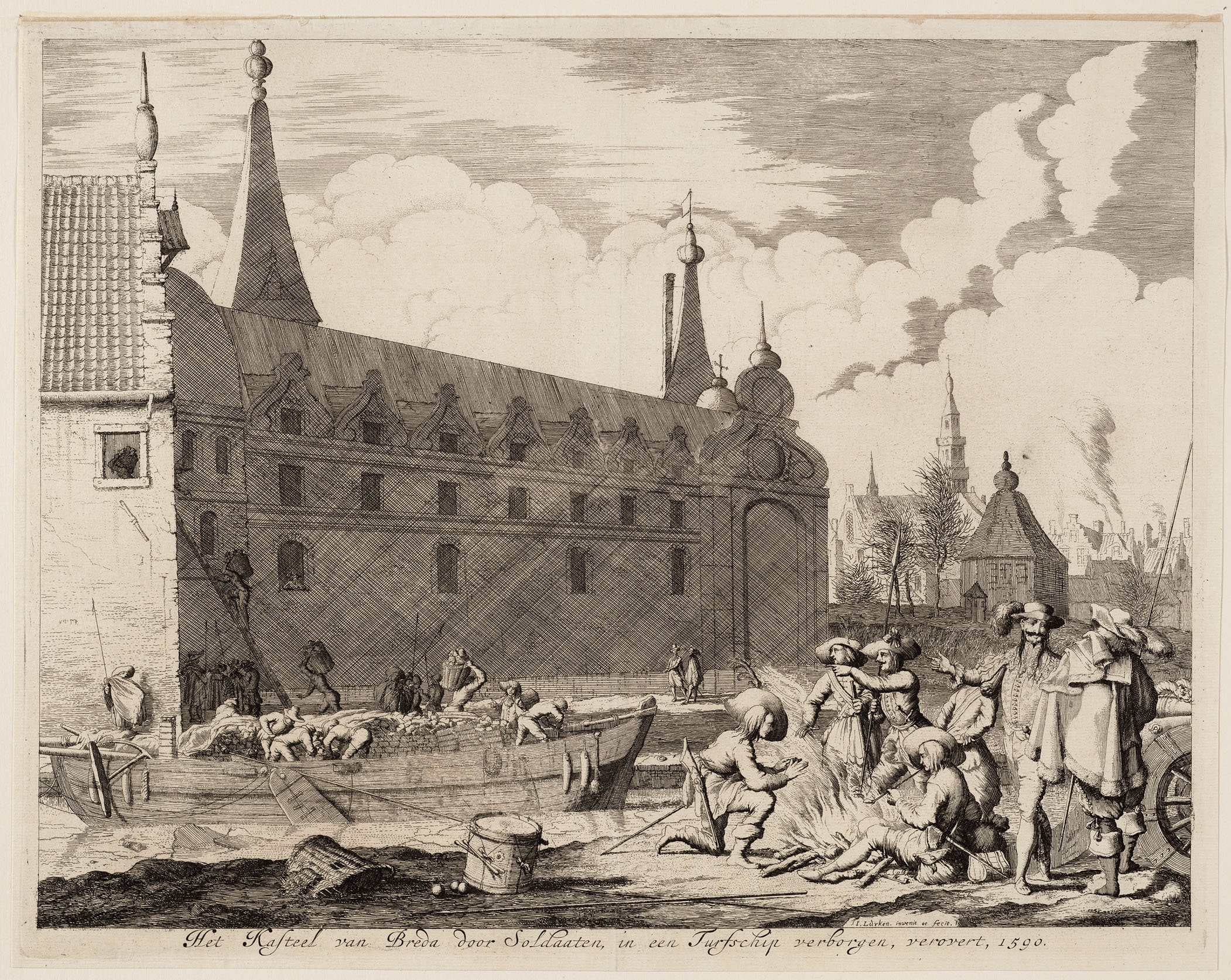
Capture of Breda in 1590 by use of a Peat boat – by Jan Luyken

Parma launched two successful campaigns against France and entered Paris on 19 September 1590, but his absence from the Netherlands provided the Dutch rebels in the north with opportunities for counter-offensives. Already on 4 March 1590 Breda was recaptured with a ruse, aided considerably by an English army under Sir Francis Vere. As Farnese did not respond, this emboldened the States to support offensive military operations for the 1591 campaigning season.

=== 1591 ===
The States Army developed a new approach to siege warfare, assembling an impressive train of siege artillery, taking the offensive in 1591. Maurice used his much enlarged army, which included reinforcements from England and with newly developed transportation methods using rivercraft, to sweep the IJssel river valley, capturing Zutphen (May) and Deventer (June); then invaded the Ommelanden, but a strike at Groningen city failed. Then he captured forts and defeated the Spanish during the Siege of Knodsenburg (July 1591). Maurice ended the campaign with the conquest of Hulst in Flanders and Nijmegen in Gelderland. In one swoop this transformed the eastern part of the Netherlands, which had hitherto been in Parma's hands.

=== 1592 ===
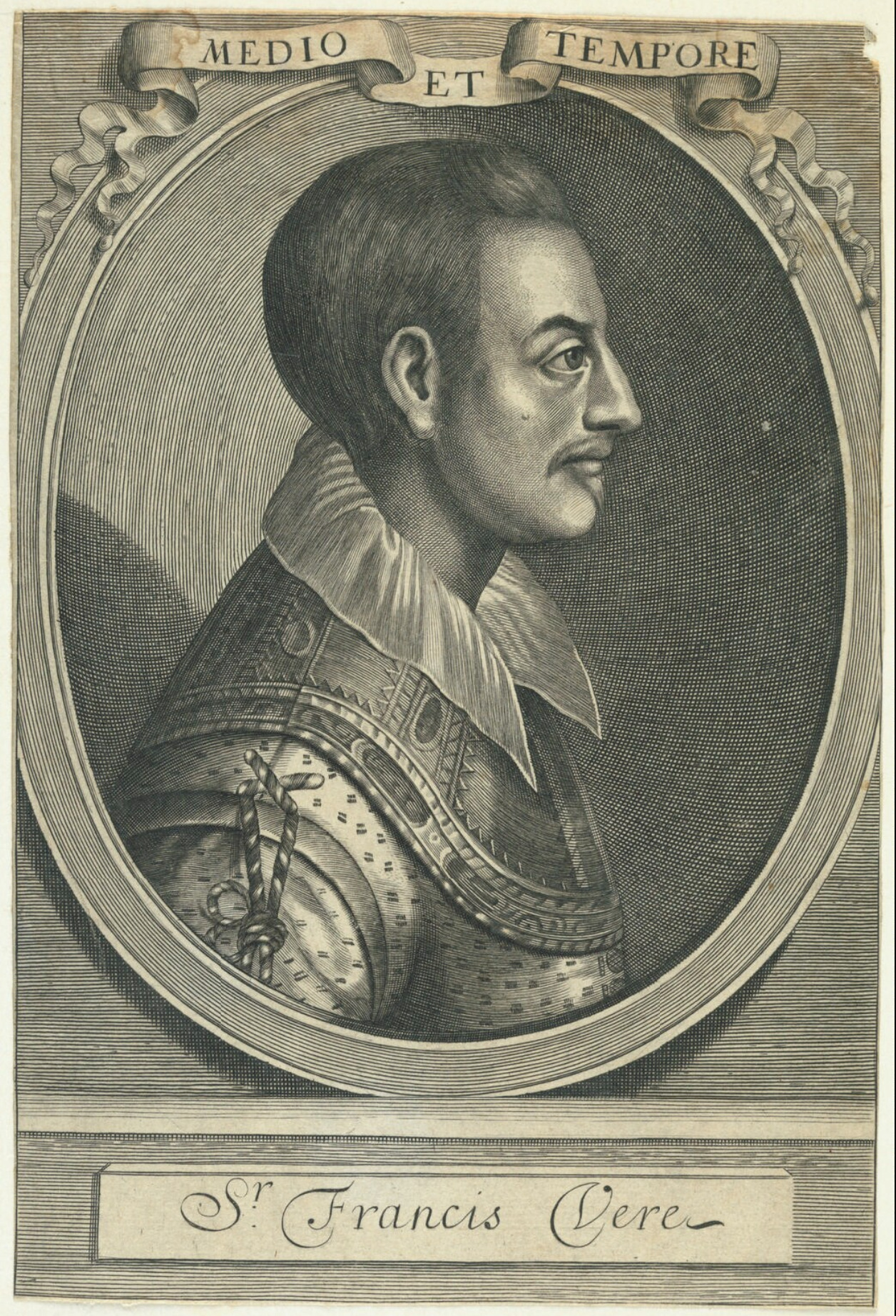
Francis Vere commanded the English and Scots contingent

The next year Maurice joined his cousin William Louis in taking Steenwijk, pounding that strongly defended fortress with 50 artillery pieces, that fired 29,000 shot. The city surrendered after 44 days. During the same campaign year the formidable fortress of Coevorden was also reduced; it surrendered after a relentless bombardment of six weeks. Drenthe was now brought under control of the States-General.

=== 1593 ===
From 14 January to 10 February 1593, the Dutch Republic and the Duchy of Bouillon jointly staged the first of two Luxemburg campaigns. This did not result in territorial gains, but did do damage to the Luxembourgish countryside, and successfully managed to distract the Spanish army.

Despite the fact that Spanish control of the northeastern Netherlands now hung by a thread, Holland insisted that first Geertruidenberg would be captured, which happened after a spectacular siege from March–June 1593, which even the great ladies of The Hague treated as a tourist attraction. Only the next year the stadtholders concentrated their attention on the northeast again, where meanwhile the particularist forces in Friesland, led by Carel Roorda, were trying to extend their hegemony over the other north-eastern provinces. This was temporarily resolved by a solution imposed by Holland, putting Friesland in its place, which the Frisians resented.

=== 1594 ===
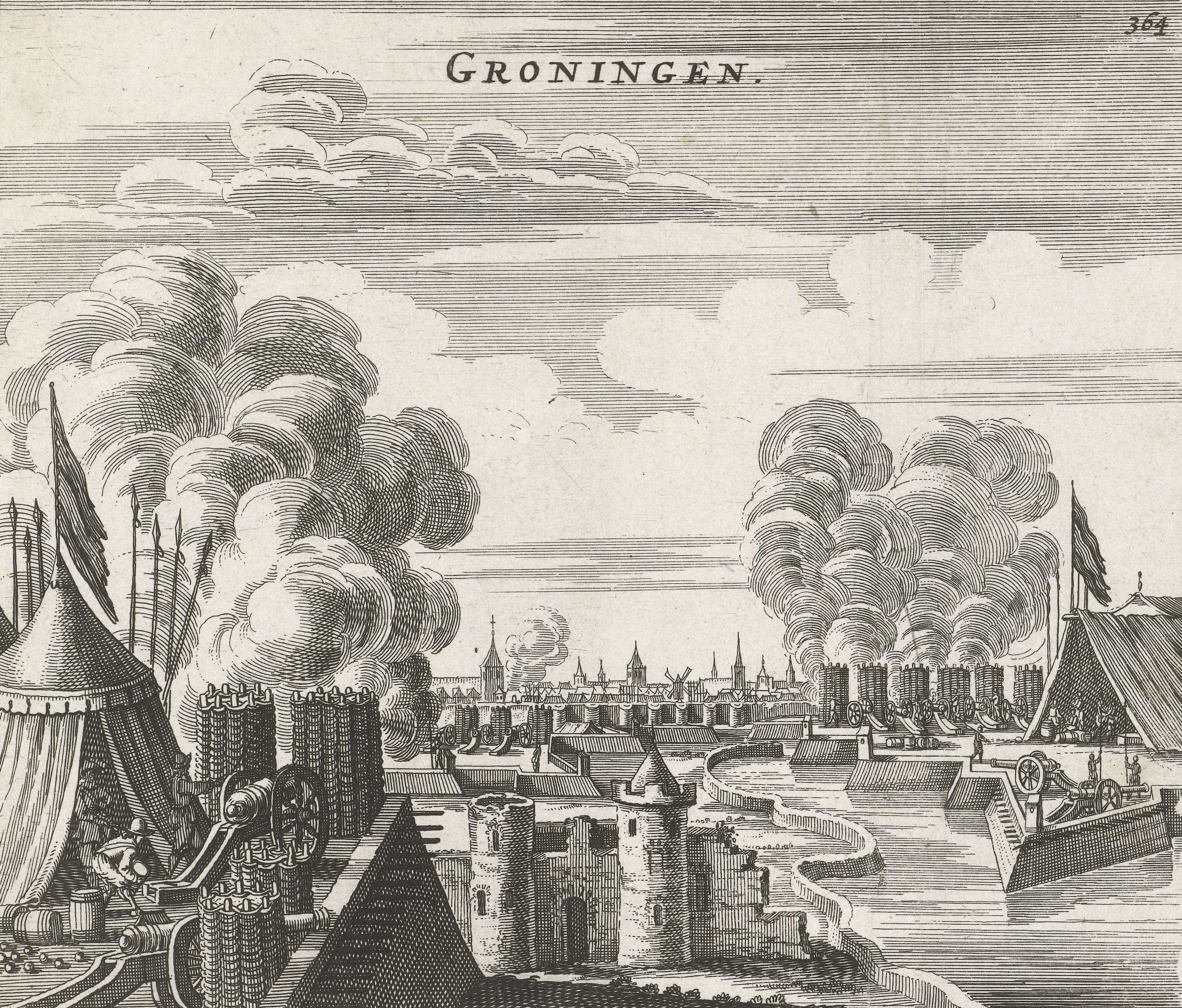
Siege of Groningen in 1594, by Jan Janssonius

Holland also attempted to avoid the expense of a lengthy siege of the strongly defended, pro-Spanish city of Groningen by offering that city an attractive deal that would maintain its status in its eternal conflict with the Ommelanden. This diplomatic initiative failed however, and Groningen was subjected to a two-month siege. After its capitulation on 22 July 1594, the city was treated "leniently", though Catholic worship was henceforth prohibited and the large body of Catholic clergy that had sought refuge in the city since 1591 forced to flee to the Southern Netherlands. The province of Groningen, City and Ommelanden, was now admitted to the Union of Utrecht, as the seventh voting province under a compromise imposed by Holland, that provided for an equal vote for both the city and the Ommelanden in the new States of Groningen. In view of the animosity between the two parties, this spelled eternal deadlock, so a casting vote was given to the new stadtholder, William Louis, who was appointed by the States-General, in this instance. (Note: In later years, Groningen, like the other provinces would itself appoint its stadtholder.) The fall of Groningen also rendered Drenthe secure and this area was constituted as a separate province (as annexation by either Friesland or Groningen was unacceptable to the other party) with its own States and stadtholder (again William Louis), though Holland blocked its getting a vote in the States-General.

=== 1595 ===
The fall of Groningen also changed the balance of forces in the German county of East Friesland, where the Lutheran Count of East Frisia, Edzard II, was opposed by the Calvinist forces in Emden. The States-General now laid a garrison in Emden, forcing the Count to recognise them diplomatically in the Treaty of Delfzijl of 1595. This also gave the Republic a strategic interest in the Ems River valley.

The second Luxemburg campaign (January–June 1595) led to the temporary occupation of Huy in neutral Liège by the Dutch States in February–March 1595, but they were soon expelled and the Duke of Bouillon was also driven away from Luxemburg's border fortresses again.

=== 1596 ===
After the death of Archduke Ernst in 1595, Archduke Albert was sent to Brussels to succeed his elder brother as Governor General of the Habsburg Netherlands. He made his entry in Brussels on 11 February 1596. His first priority was restoring Spain's military position in the Low Countries. During his first campaign season, Albert surprised his enemies by capturing Calais and nearby Ardres from the French and Hulst from the Dutch. These successes were however offset by the third bankruptcy of the Spanish crown later that year. The successful attack on Cádiz by an Anglo-Dutch task force was the main cause of this. This meant that payments to the army dried up and led to mutinies and desertions. As a consequence, 1597 was marked by a series of Spanish military disasters.

=== 1597 ===
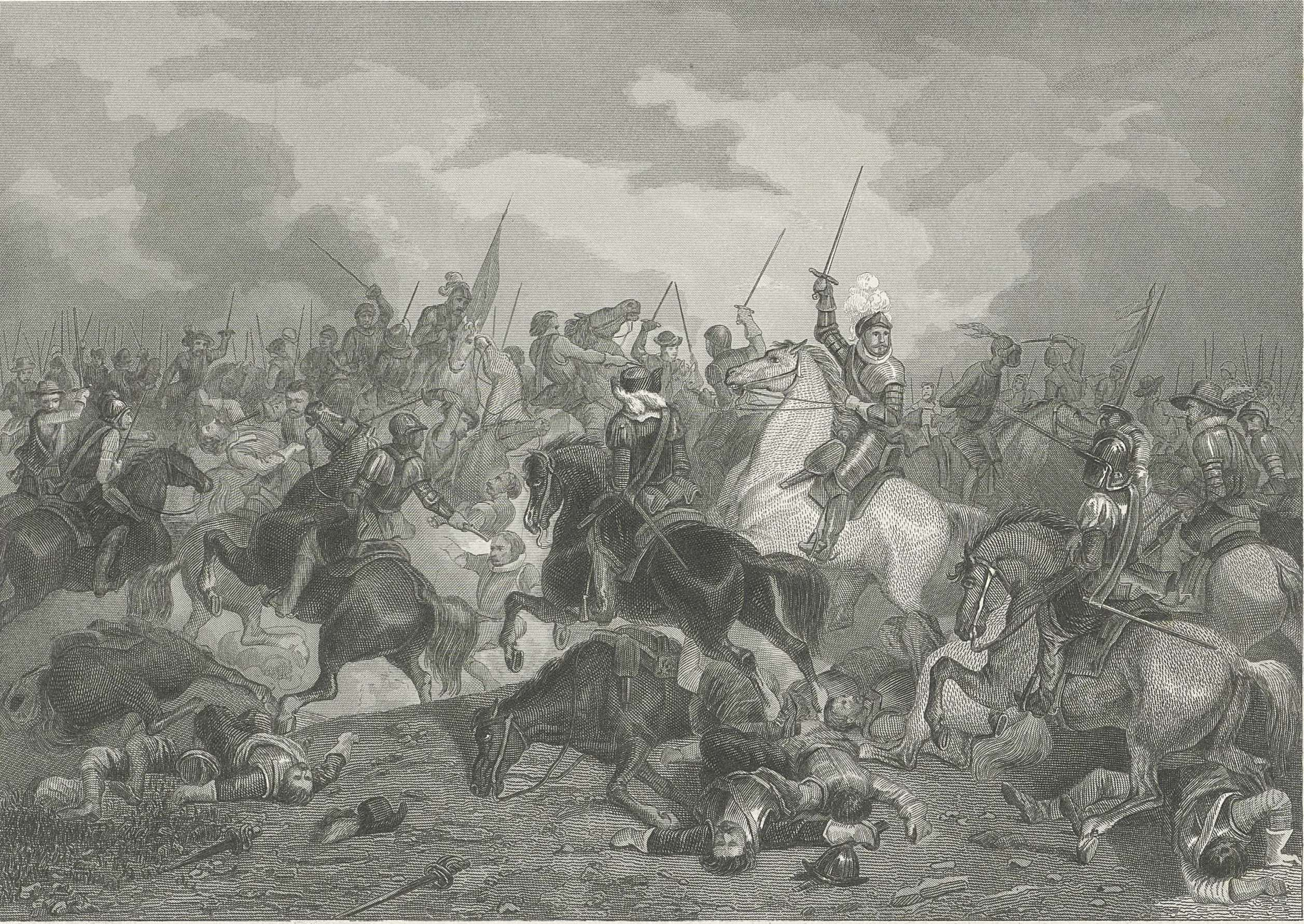
The Battle of Turnhout in 1597

The Republic's strategic interest in the Ems River valley was reinforced during the stadtholders' large offensive of 1597. Albert's Spanish army of 4,600 attempted to surprise Tholen but Maurice's Anglo-Dutch army beat them to it and defeated them at Turnhout in a rare pitched battle in January. Following this he seized the fortress of Rheinberg, a strategic Rhine crossing, and subsequently Groenlo, Oldenzaal and Enschede, before capturing the county of Lingen and the county of the same name. This reinforced Dutch hegemony in the Ems valley. Capture of these cities secured for a while the dominance of the Dutch over eastern Overijssel and Gelderland, which had hitherto been firmly in Spanish hands.

=== 1598 ===
The end of Spanish-French hostilities after the Peace of Vervins of 2 May 1598 would free up the Army of Flanders again for operations in the Netherlands. Soon after, under financial and military pressure, on 6 May, Philip ceded the thrones of the Netherlands to his elder daughter Isabella and her husband (Philip's nephew) Albert, who would henceforth reign as co-sovereigns. They proved to be highly competent rulers, although their sovereignty was largely nominal as the Army of Flanders was to remain in the Netherlands, largely paid for by the new king of Spain, Philip III.

Nevertheless, ceding the Netherlands made it theoretically easier to pursue a compromise peace, as both the archdukes and the chief minister of the new king, the duke of Lerma, were less inflexible towards the Republic than Philip II had been. Soon secret negotiations were started which, however, proved abortive because Spain insisted on two points that were unacceptable to the Dutch: recognition of the sovereignty of the Archdukes (though they were ready to accept Maurice as their stadtholder in the Dutch provinces) and freedom of worship for Catholics in the north. The Republic was too insecure internally (the loyalty of the recently conquered areas being in doubt) to accede on the latter point, while the first point would have invalidated the entire revolt. The war therefore continued. However, peace with France and the secret peace negotiations had temporarily slackened Spain's resolve to pay its troops adequately and this, as before, occasioned the widespread mutinies.

== Aftermath ==
The Dutch successes owed not only to Maurice's tactical skill but also to the financial burden Spain incurred replacing ships lost in the disastrous campaign of the Spanish Armada in 1588, and the need to refit its navy to recover control of the seas after the subsequent English counterattack. One of the most notable features of this war are the number of mutinies by the troops in the Spanish army because of arrears of pay. At least 40 mutinies in the period 1570 to 1607 are known to have occurred.

In 1595, when Henry IV of France declared war against Spain, the Spanish government declared bankruptcy again. However, by restoring its maritime dominance, Spain was able to greatly increase its supply of gold and silver from the Americas, which allowed it to increase military pressure on England and France. By now, it had become clear that Spanish control of the Southern Netherlands was strong. However, the Dutch Republic's control over Zeeland meant that it closed the estuary of the Scheldt, the entry to the important port of Antwerp. The port of Amsterdam benefited greatly from the blockade of the port of Antwerp, to the extent that merchants in the North began to question the desirability of reconquering the South. As future campaigns were mostly restricted to the border areas of the current Netherlands, the Republic's demographic, economic and political heartland of Holland remained at peace, beginning the Dutch Golden Age.

== Concurrent developments ==
=== Dutch military reforms ===
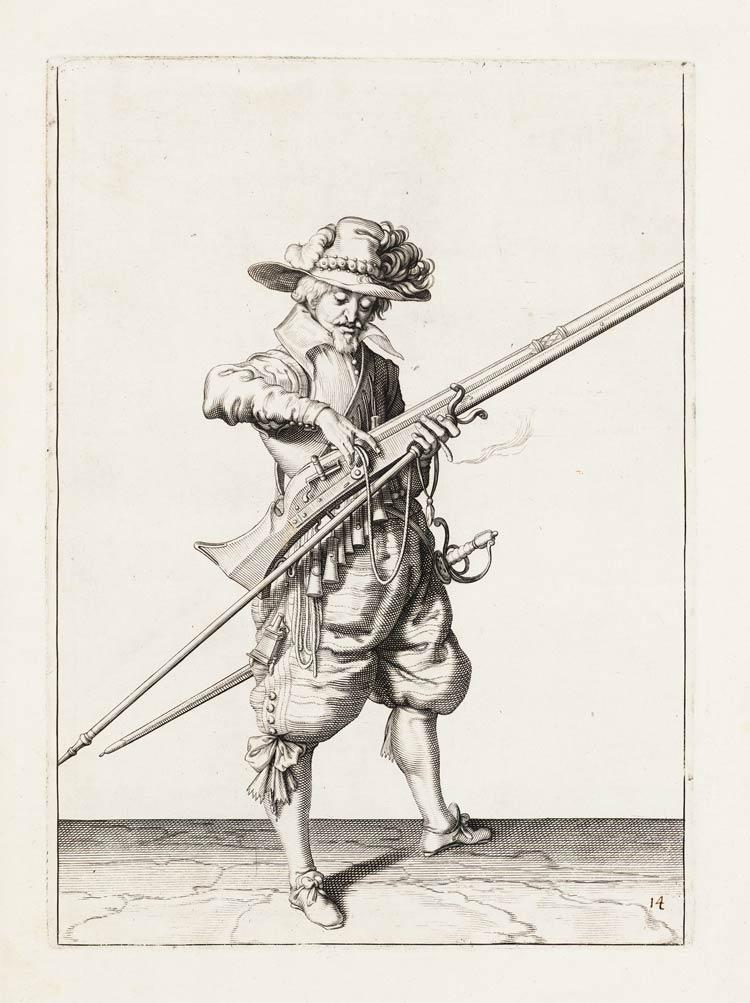
Musket instruction by Jacob de Gheyn II

The Spanish Road

Henry IV of France's succession to the French throne in 1589 occasioned a new civil war in France, in which Philip soon intervened on the Catholic side. He ordered Parma to use the Army of Flanders for this intervention and this put Parma in the unenviable position of having to fight a two-front war. There was at first little to fear from the Dutch, and he had taken the added precaution of heavily fortifying a number of the cities in Brabant and the north-eastern Netherlands he had recently acquired, so he could withdraw his main army to the French border with some confidence.

However, this offered the Dutch a respite from his relentless pressure that they soon put to good use. Under the two stadtholders, Maurice and William Louis, the Dutch States Army was in a short time thoroughly reformed from an ill-disciplined, ill-paid rabble of mercenary companies from all over Protestant Europe, to a well-disciplined, well-paid professional army, with many soldiers, skilled in the use of modern firearms, like arquebuses, and soon the more modern muskets. The use of these fire-arms required tactical innovations like the counter-march of files of musketeers to enable rapid volley fire by ranks; such complicated manoevres had to be instilled by constant drilling. As part of their army reform the stadtholders therefore made extensive use of military manuals, often inspired by classical examples of Roman infantry tactics, such as the ones edited by Justus Lipsius in De Militia Romana of 1595. Jacob de Gheyn II later published an elaborately illustrated example of such a manual under the auspices of Maurice, but there were others. These reforms were in the 17th century emulated by other European armies, like the Swedish army of Gustavus Adolphus of Sweden. But the Dutch army developed them first.

Besides these organisational and tactical reforms, the two stadtholders also developed a new approach to siege warfare. They appreciated the peculiar difficulties of the terrain for this type of warfare in most of the Netherlands, which necessitated much labour for the digging of investments. Previously, many soldiers disdained the manual work required and armies usually press-ganged hapless peasants. Maurice, however, required his soldiers to do the digging, which caused an appreciable improvement in the quality of the work. Maurice also assembled an impressive train of siege artillery, much larger than armies of the time usually had available, which enabled him to systematically pulverise enemy fortresses. He was to put this to good use, when the Republic went on the offensive in 1591.

=== Politics of the Dutch Republic ===
The Dutch Republic was not proclaimed with great fanfare. In fact, after the departure of Leicester the States of the several provinces and the States-General conducted business as usual. This came in the wake of a debate in 1587 over the question of who held sovereignty. The polemic was started by the English member of the Council of State, Sir Thomas Wilkes, who published a learned Remonstrance in March, in which he attacked the States of Holland because they undermined the authority of Leicester to whom, in Wilkes's view, the people of the Netherlands had transferred sovereignty in the absence of a "legitimate prince" (presumably Philip). The States of Holland reacted with an equally learned treatise, the Deduction of Vrancken (1587), drawn up by the pensionary of the city of Gouda, François Vranck (Note: Entitled in translation:Short exposition of the right exercised from old times by the knighthood, nobles and towns of Holland and Westvriesland for the maintenance of the liberties, rights, privileges and laudable customs of the country) on their behalf, in which it was explained that popular sovereignty in Holland (and by extension in other provinces) in the view of the States resided in the vroedschappen and nobility, and that it was administered by (not transferred to) the States of Holland, and that this had been the case from time immemorial. In other words, in this view the republic already existed, so it did not need to be brought into being. Vranck's conclusions reflected the view of the States of Holland at that time and would form the basis of the ideology of the States-Party faction in Dutch politics, in their defence against the "monarchical" views of their hard-line Calvinist and Orangist enemies in future decades.

The instruction of 12 April 1588 would formally transfer sovereignty from the landvoogd to the Council of State, while the oath of allegiance of the Dutch States Army and Navy and foreign mercenaries was transferred to the States-General. The Orangists (and many contemporary foreign observers and later historians) often argued that the confederal government machinery of the Netherlands, in which the delegates to the States and States-General constantly had to refer back to their principals in the cities, could not work without the unifying influence of an "eminent head" (like a Regent or Governor-General, or later a stadtholder).

However, the first years of the Dutch Republic proved otherwise (as in hindsight the experience with the States-General since 1576, ably managed by William of Orange, had proven). Oldenbarnevelt proved to be Orange's equal in virtuosity of parliamentary management. The government he informally led proved to be quite effective, at least as long as the war lasted. In the three years after 1588 the position of the Republic improved appreciably, despite setbacks like the betrayal of Geertruidenberg to Parma by its English garrison in 1588.

=== Economic and demographic changes in the Netherlands ===
Internally, aided by the influx of Protestant refugees from the South - which became a flood after the fall of Antwerp in 1585 - a long-term economic boom began, that in its first phase would last until the second decade of the next century. The newcomers brought necessary entrepreneurial qualities, capital, labour skills and know-how to start an industrial and trade revolution. The economic resources that this boom generated were easily mobilised by the budding "fiscal-military state" in the Netherlands, that had its origin, ironically, in the Habsburg attempts at centralisation earlier in the century. Though the revolt was in the main motivated by resistance against this Spanish "fiscal-military state" on the absolutist model, in the course of this resistance the Dutch constructed their own model that, though explicitly structured in a decentralised fashion (with decision-making at the lowest, instead of the highest level) was at least as efficient at resource mobilisation for war as the Spanish one.

This started in the desperate days of the early revolt in which the Dutch regents had to resort to harsh taxation and forced loans to finance their war efforts. In the long run these very policies helped reinforce the fiscal and economic system, as the system of tax harvesting that was developed formed an efficient and sturdy base for the debt service of the state, thereby reinforcing the trust of lenders in its credit-worthiness. Innovations, such as the making of a secondary market for forced loans by town governments helped merchants to regain liquidity, and helped launch the financial system that made the Netherlands the first modern economy. Though in the early 1590s this fiscal-military state was only in its early stages, and not as formidable as it would become in the next century, it already made the struggle between Spain and the Dutch Republic less unequal than it had been in the early years of the revolt.

== Map gallery ==
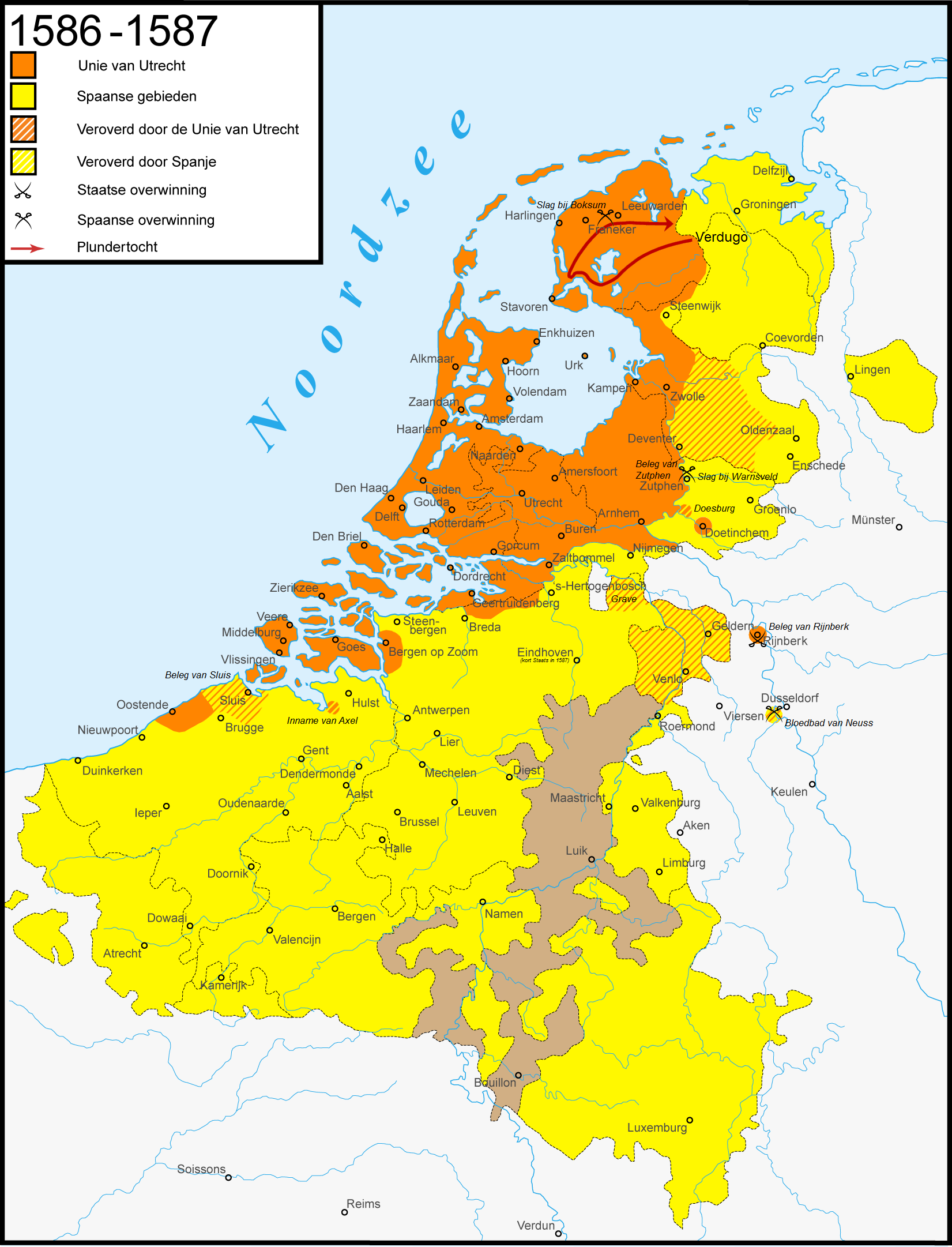
1586–1587 (before)

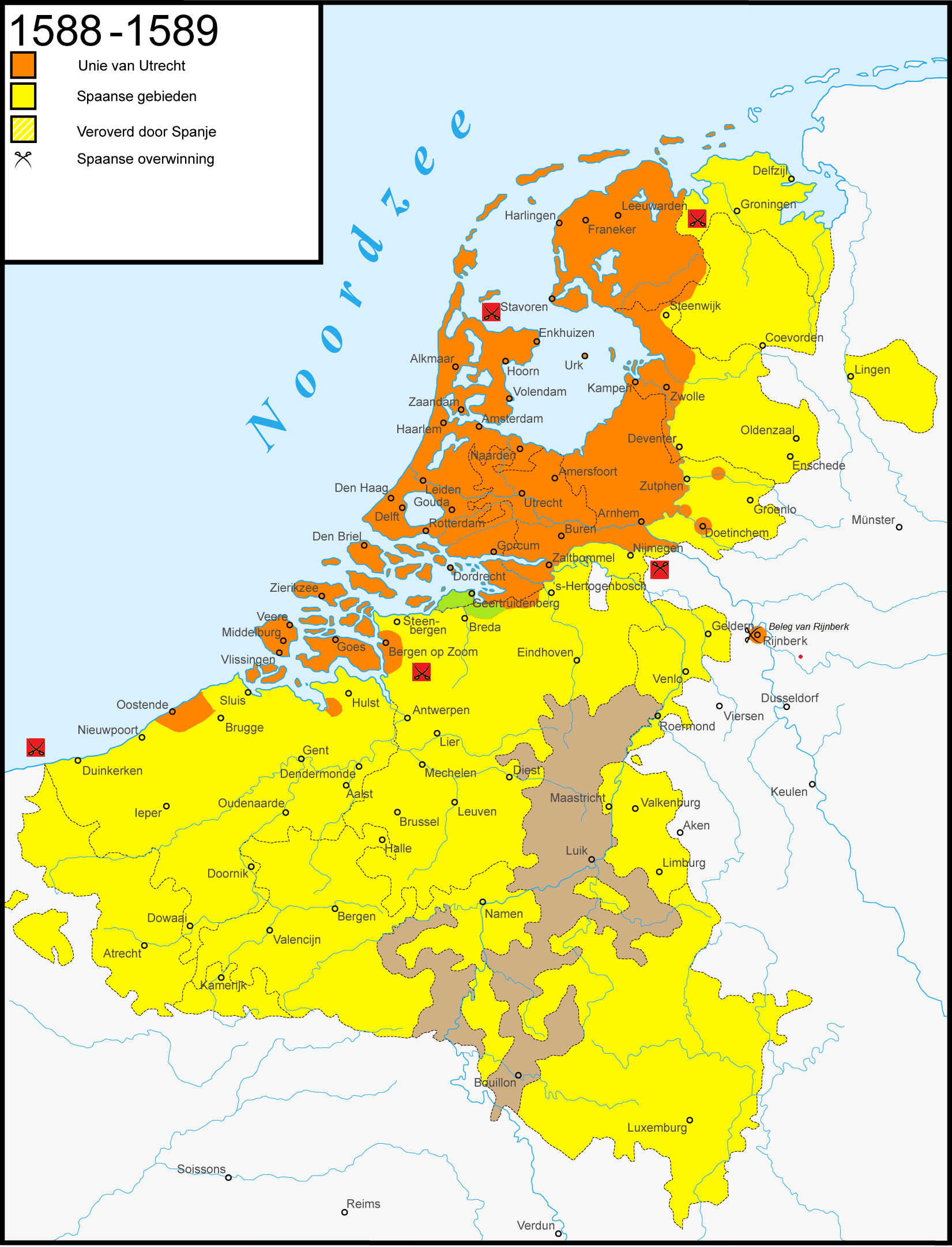
1588–1589

1590–1592

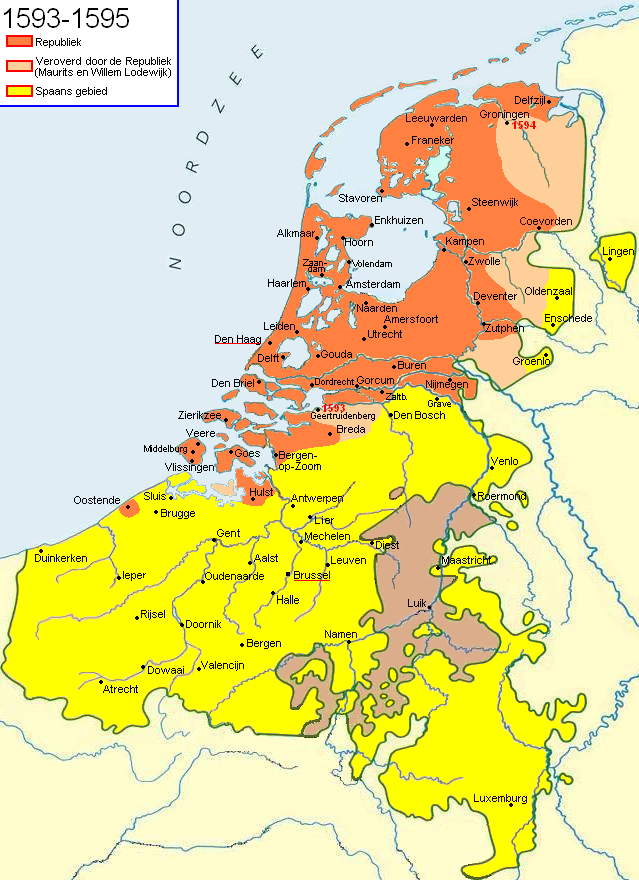
1593–1595

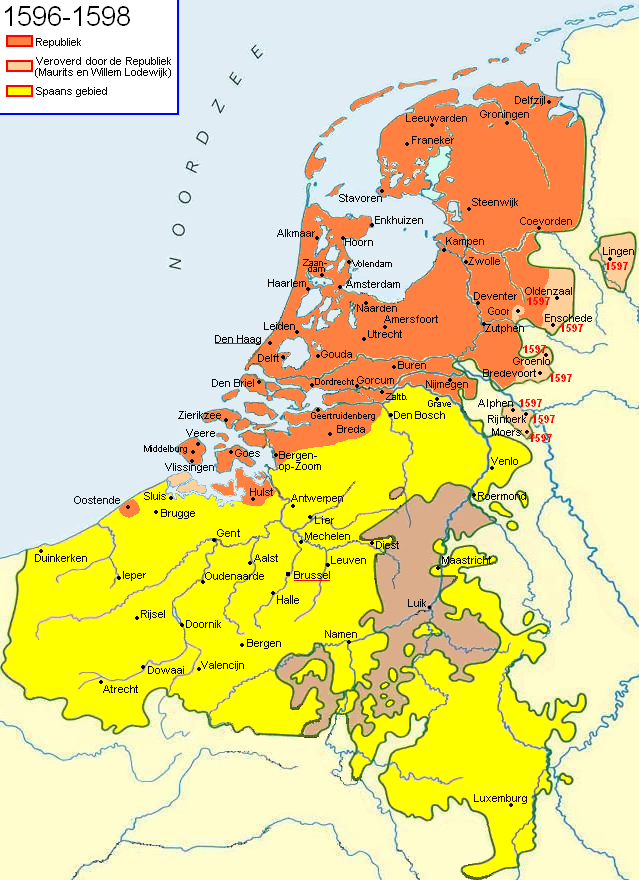
1596–1598

1597 Maurice campaign (Dutch)

1597 Maurice campaign (Spanish)

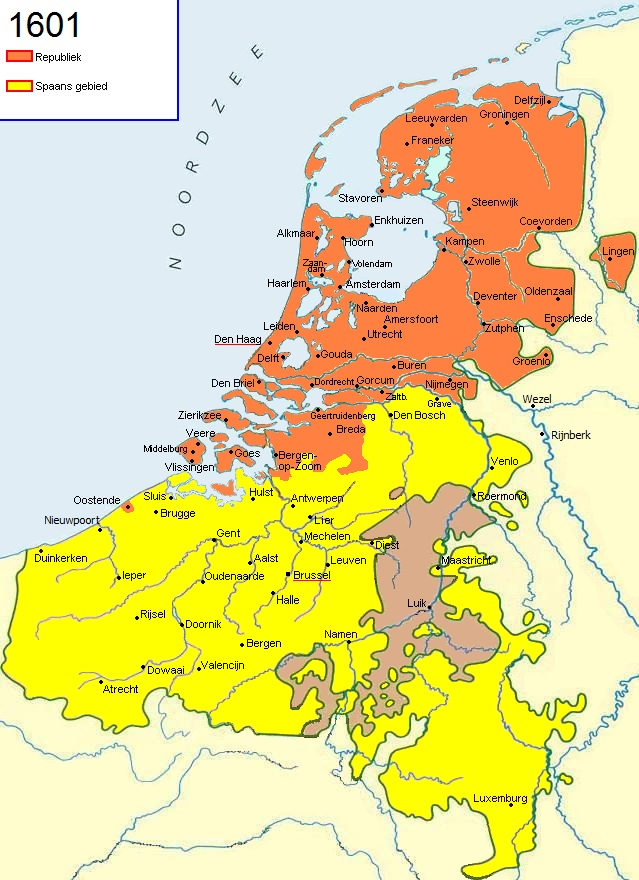
1601 (after)

== Bibliography ==
- Fruin, Robert Jacobus (1899). Tien jaren uit den Tachtigjarigen Oorlog. 1588–1598. The Hague: Martinus Nijhoff. p. 386. (5th edition; original published in 1858)
- van Gelderen, M. (2002). The Political Thought of the Dutch Revolt 1555–1590. Cambridge University Press. ISBN 0-521-89163-9.
- Glete, J. (2002). War and the State in Early Modern Europe. Spain, the Dutch Republic and Sweden as Fiscal-Military States, 1500–1660. Routledge. ISBN 0-415-22645-7.
- Groenveld, Simon; Leeuwenberg, Huib (2020). De Tachtigjarige Oorlog. Opstand en consolidatie in de Nederlanden (ca. 1560–1650). Derde editie (in Dutch). Zutphen: Walburg Pers. p. 750. ISBN 9789462495661. (e-book; original publication 2008; in cooperation with M. Mout and W. Zappey)
- Israel, Jonathan (1989). Dutch Primacy in World Trade, 1585–1740. Clarendon Press. ISBN 0-19-821139-2.
- Israel, Jonathan (1995). The Dutch Republic: Its Rise, Greatness, and Fall 1477–1806. Oxford: Clarendon Press. ISBN 0-19-873072-1.
- Koenigsberger, Helmut G. (2007). Monarchies, States Generals and Parliaments. The Netherlands in the fifteenth and sixteenth centurie. Cambridge University Press. ISBN 978-0-521-04437-0. [2001] paperback
- van der Lem, Anton (2019). Revolt in the Netherlands: The Eighty Years War, 1568–1648. London: Reaktion Books. p. 143. ISBN 9781789140880.
- Markham, Clements (2007). The Fighting Veres: Lives Of Sir Francis Vere And Sir Horace Vere. Kessinger Publishing. ISBN 978-1432549053.
- Gelderblom, Oscar (2000). Zuid-Nederlandse kooplieden en de opkomst van de Amsterdamse stapelmarkt (1578–1630) (in Dutch). Hilversum: Verloren. p. 350. ISBN 9789065506207.
