= Siege of Rheinberg (1597) =

1597 conflict

- Part of the Eighty Years' War and the Anglo–Spanish War
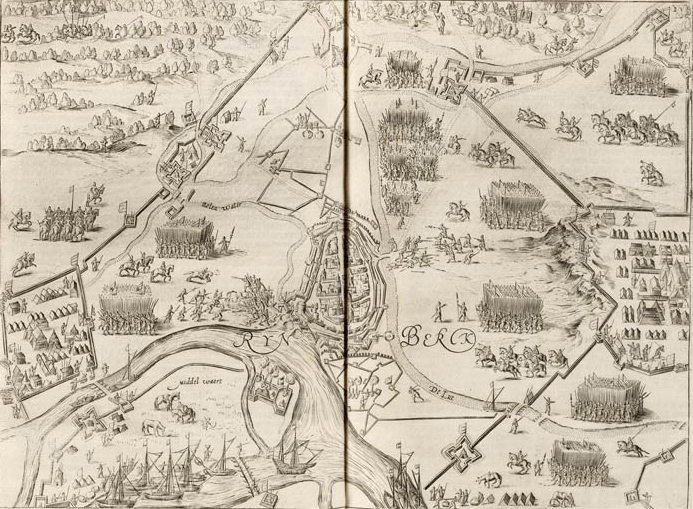
- Siege of Rheinberg in 1597 by Jan Janssonius
Date	9 up to 19 August 1597
Location	Rheinberg (present-day Germany) 51°32′48″N 6°36′02″E
Result	Dutch and English victory

Belligerents
Dutch Republic; England	(Spain) Spanish Empire

Commanders and leaders
(Dutch Republic) Maurice of Nassau (England) Horace Vere	(Spain) Camillo Sachino

Strength
8,200	850

Casualties and losses
Light	All captured

The siege of Rheinberg took place from the 9 to 19 August 1597 during the Eighty Years' War and the Anglo–Spanish War by a Dutch and English army led by Maurice of Orange. The siege ended with the capitulation and the withdrawal of the Spanish after much unrest in the garrison. The liberation of the city of Rheinberg was the commencement of Maurice's campaign of 1597, a successful offensive against the Spaniards during the period known as the Ten Glory Years.

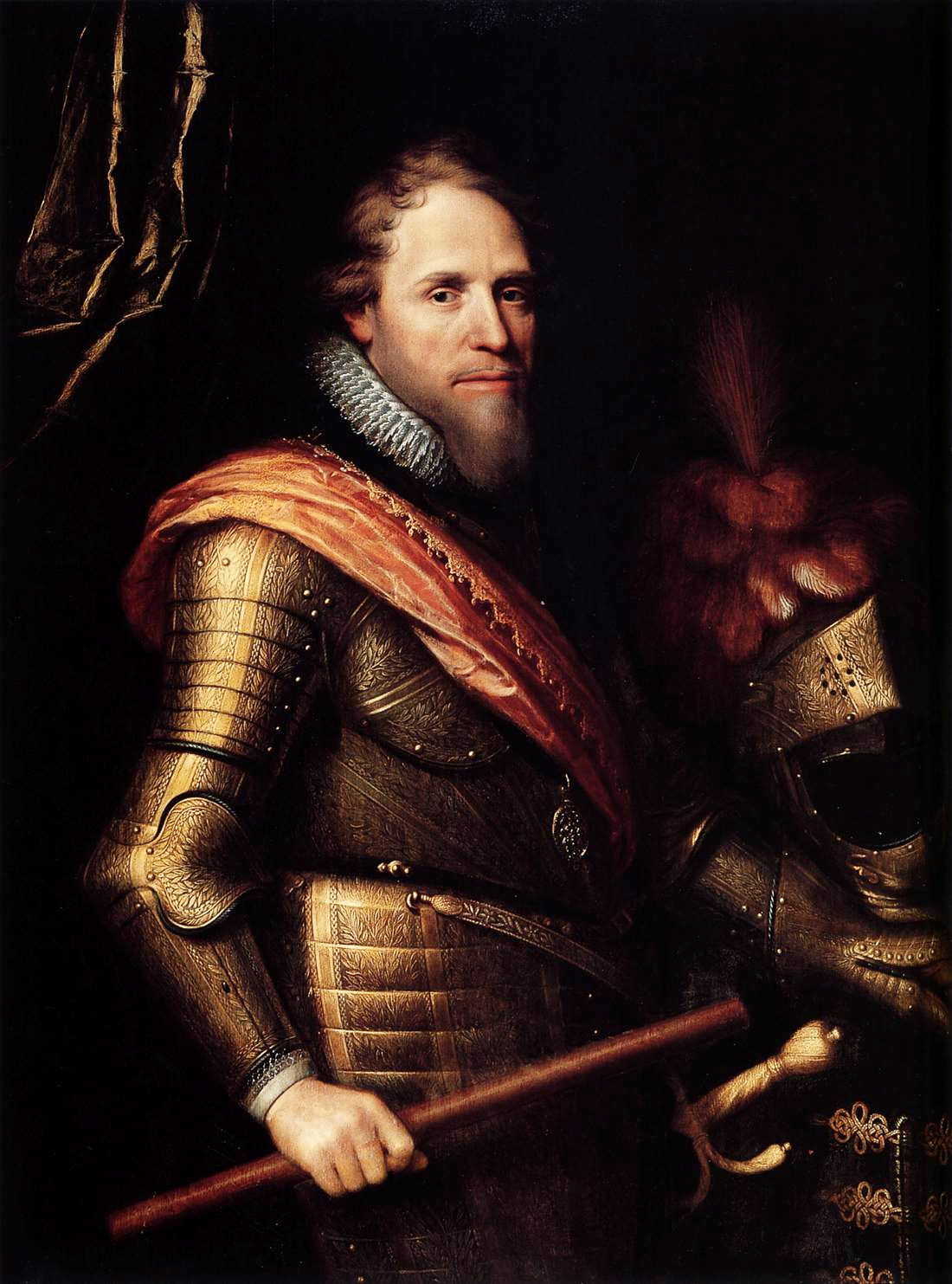
Maurice of Orange

== Background ==
The fortified town of Rheinberg, which had been in the possession of the Electorate of Cologne, had been garrisoned by the Spanish for seven years after the place was finally taken by Peter Ernst I von Mansfeld on 3 February 1590 after a four-year siege. In mid 1597, the government at The Hague with improved funding ordered a new campaign for Maurice of Orange, the commander of the Dutch and English troops, to oust the Spanish in Twente while they had been preoccupied with the siege of Amiens. Maurice's objective was to march along the Rhine and take the towns of Rheinberg and Meurs along the river, then head directly through the east of the Netherlands, where Grol and Oldenzaal being the strongest cities. The conquest of Rheinberg was important for Gelderland as it would increase the isolation of Spanish bases in the rest of Overijssel.

On the 4th of August Maurice along with his cousin (and brother-in-law) William Louis arrived at Arnhem with a force of seven thousand infantry and twelve hundred cavalry. This included thirteen ensigns of English troops under Colonel Horace Vere and ten ensigns of Scots under Sir Henry Balfour. Horace's brother Francis Vere was at this time governor of Brill and general of Elizabeth I's forces in the Netherlands and this meant Horace was temporarily in the field.

== Siege and aftermath ==
After reducing the town and castle of Alphen, Maurice marched to Rheinberg arriving there on 10 August and immediately attacked. The Spanish garrison of Rheinberg consisted of 850 men under the command of Camilo Sachino who had held many governing positions in the region for many years. The garrison though was not in a fit state to fight having had many desertions through lack of pay and many were unwilling to fight.

The Dutch and English army had access to a large quantity of artillery, which had landed via barges from the Rhine. On 11 August 1597 approaches were dug towards the city's walls as the siege commenced. William Louis of Nassau was wounded by a bullet in the thigh and Maurice not long after had a cannonball fly just over his head as it entered his tent while in repose. Once the batteries were placed, the city was intensively shelled which added to the misery of the garrison.

After ten days of shelling the Sachino afraid of a mutiny in the garrison called for negotiations and then surrendered on 20 August; the Archbishop of Rheinberg begged for the place and the populace to be spared from pillaging which Maurice agreed to. The Spanish garrison, who were allowed the honors of war but were not to fight for a long time, then marched out and the Dutch and English marched in. With the capture of Rheinberg Maurice knew that access over the Rhine was now an easy task and the East of the Netherlands was now open to him. Maurice's troops were thus able to take the offensive further and capture Meurs, Groenlo, Bredevoort, Enschede, Oldenzaal, and closed off the year and the campaign with the capture of Lingen.

The following year a Spanish force under Francisco de Mendoza, knowing how important Rheinberg was, retook the place, which the city garnered a new nickname La puta de la guerra (whore of war), a name that would stick for the next 35 years.

The Spanish occupation under Commander Don Luis Bernardo de Avila would last only till 1601 when Maurice again captured Rheinberg after a siege of more than a month.

Rheinberg was repeatably taken and retaken before in 1633 the place finally came back into Dutch hands.

== See also ==
- List of stadtholders in the Low Countries
- List of governors of the Spanish Netherlands
- Siege of Rheinberg (1586–1590)
- Siege of Meurs (1597)
