= Siege of Lingen =

Siege of Lingen may refer to:

- Siege of Lingen (1597)
- Siege of Lingen (1605)
