= Maurice, Prince of Orange =

Dutch Republic stadtholder and Prince of Orange (1567–1625)

Maurits of Orange
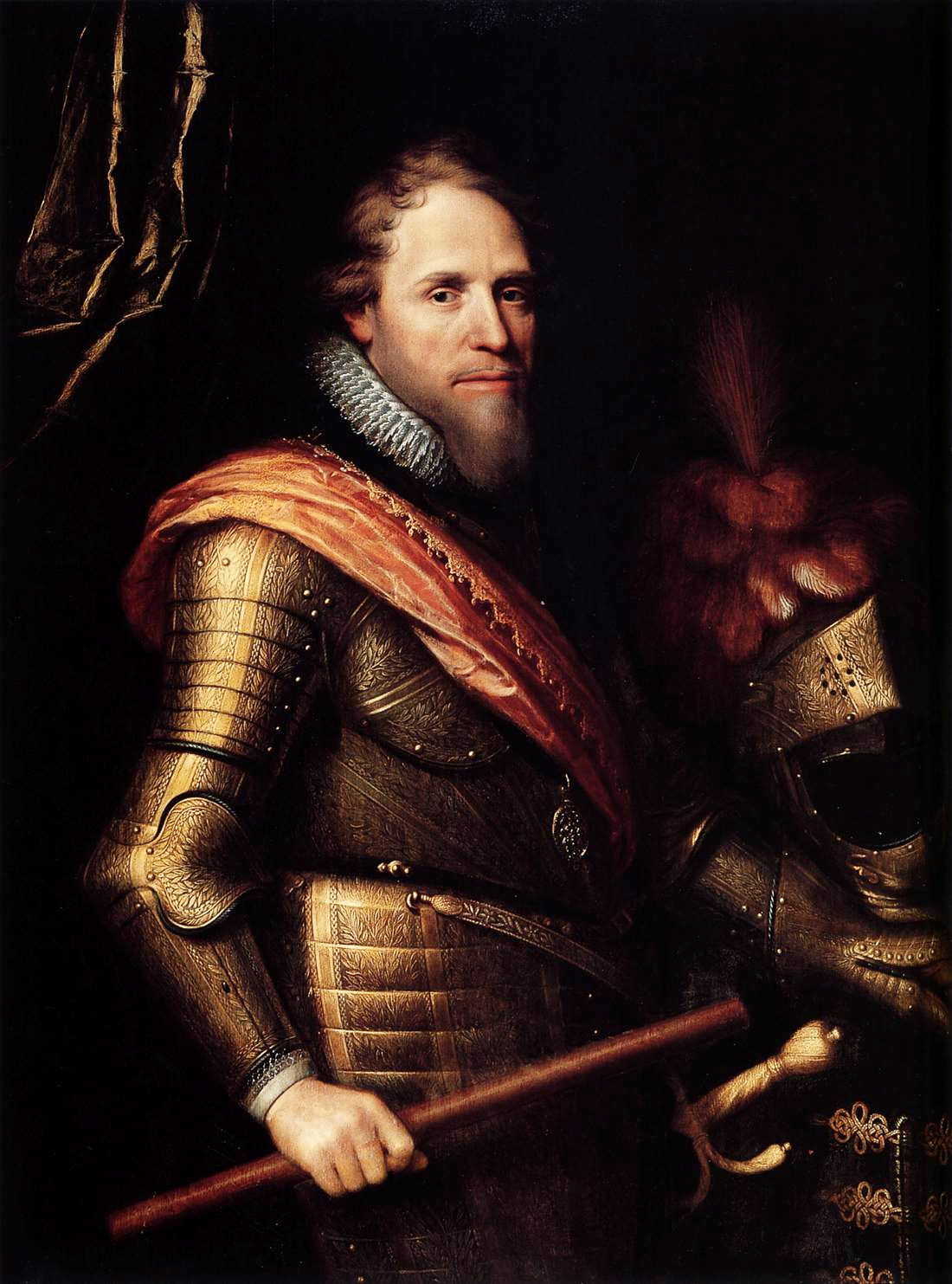
- Portrait by Michiel Jansz. van Mierevelt, 1607

Prince of Orange
- In office 20 February 1618 – 23 April 1625
- Preceded by: Philip William
- Succeeded by: Frederick Henry

Stadtholder of Holland and Zeeland
- In office 14 November 1585 – 23 April 1625
- Preceded by: William the Silent
- Succeeded by: Frederick Henry

Stadtholder of Utrecht, Guelders, and Overijssel
- In office 1590 – 23 April 1625
- Preceded by: Adolf van Nieuwenaar
- Succeeded by: Frederick Henry

Stadtholder of Groningen
- In office 1620 – 23 April 1625
- Preceded by: William Louis
- Succeeded by: Ernst Casimir

Personal details
- Born: 14 November 1567 Dillenburg, County of Nassau, Holy Roman Empire
- Died: 23 April 1625 (aged 57) The Hague, County of Holland, Dutch Republic
- Resting place: Nieuwe Kerk, Delft, Netherlands
- Parents: William the Silent (father); Anna of Saxony (mother)

Maurice of Orange (Dutch: Maurits van Oranje; 14 November 1567 – 23 April 1625) was stadtholder of all the provinces of the Dutch Republic—except Friesland—from 1585 until his death. Prior to inheriting the title Prince of Orange from his elder half-brother, Philip William, in 1618, he was known as Maurice of Nassau (Dutch: Maurits van Nassau).

Born in Dillenburg, Nassau, Maurice was educated at the Heidelberg University and the University of Leiden. He succeeded his father, William the Silent, as stadtholder of Holland and Zeeland in 1585, and later assumed the same position in Utrecht, Guelders, and Overijssel (1590), and Groningen (1620). As Captain-General and Admiral of the Union, Maurice reorganized the Dutch States Army, transforming the Dutch Revolt into a disciplined and effective military campaign.

Working alongside the Land's Advocate of Holland, Johan van Oldenbarnevelt, Maurice led a series of victories that drove Spanish forces from much of the northern and eastern Netherlands. He gained wide recognition as one of the foremost military strategists of his time, particularly for his innovations in siege warfare and the development of a modern military drill system. He is widely credited with pioneering training methods that drew from classical principles outlined by Vegetius, forming one of the basis for early modern European armies.

During the Twelve Years' Truce (1609–1621), a theological and political conflict broke out within the Republic, culminating in a power struggle between Maurice and Oldenbarnevelt. The dispute ended with Oldenbarnevelt's arrest and execution by beheading in 1619, a controversial act that marked a shift in Maurice's political role. After the truce, his military campaigns saw little further success.

Maurice died in The Hague in 1625 without legitimate issue. He was succeeded by his half-brother, Frederick Henry. The island of Mauritius was named in his honor.

== Life ==
Maurice was the son of William the Silent and Anna of Saxony and was born at the castle of Dillenburg. He was named after his maternal grandfather, the Elector Maurice of Saxony, who was also a noted general.

Maurice never married but was the father of illegitimate children by Margaretha van Mechelen (including Willem of Nassau, Lord of the Lek, and Louis of Nassau, Lord of De Lek and Beverweerd) and Anna van de Kelder. He was raised in Dillenburg by his uncle Johan of Nassau ("Jan the Old"). Together with his cousin, Willem Lodewijk, he studied in Heidelberg and later in Leiden where he met Simon Stevin. The States of Holland and Zeeland paid for his studies, as their father had run into financial problems after spending his entire fortune in the early stages of the Dutch revolt.

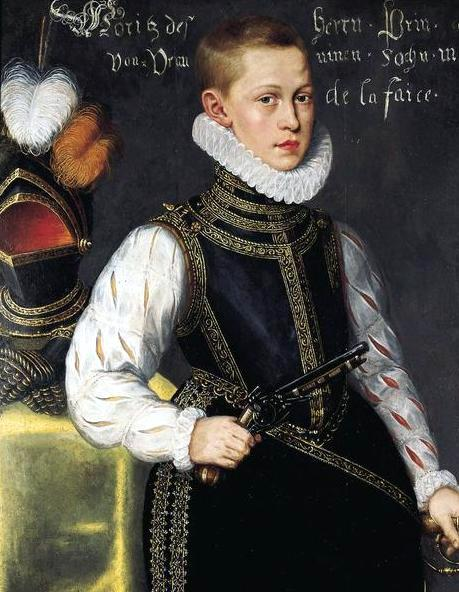
Maurice as a child

Only 16 when his father was murdered in Delft in 1584, he soon was appointed to his father's office of stadtholder (Stadhouder). The monarchs of England and France had been requested to accept sovereignty but had refused. This had left Maurice as the only acceptable candidate for the position of Stadtholder. He became stadtholder of Holland and Zeeland in 1585, of Guelders, Overijssel and Utrecht in 1590 and of Groningen and Drenthe in 1620 (following the death of Willem Lodewijk, who had been stadtholder there and in Friesland).

Protestant Maurice was preceded as Prince of Orange (not a Dutch title) by his Roman Catholic eldest half-brother Philip William, Prince of Orange, deceased 1618. However, Philip William was in the custody of Spain, remaining so until 1596, and was thus unable to lead the Dutch independence cause.

Maria of Nassau (1556–1616) was a full sister of Philip William from the first marriage of William I, Prince of Orange, (assassinated 1584), to wealthy and powerful aristocrat Anna van Egmont (1533–1558), and a contender to Maurice over the estate of their father.

He was appointed captain-general of the army in 1587, bypassing the Earl of Leicester, who returned to England on hearing this news.

== Military career ==
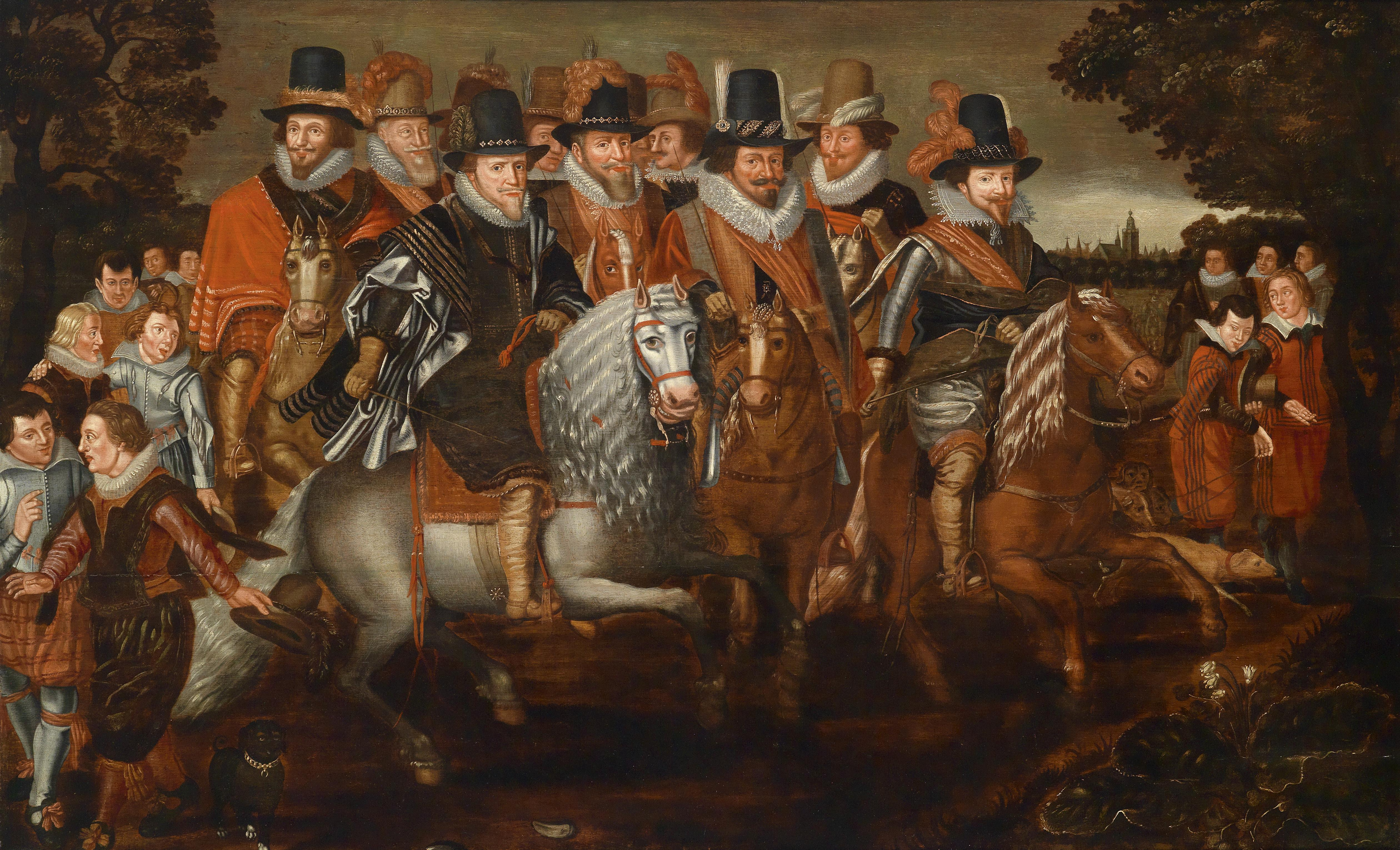
The Cavalcade of princes of the House of Orange and Nassau, 1. Front Row: Maurice (1567–1625), Philip William (1558–1618), Frederick Henry (1584–1647), 2. Second Row: William Louis (1560–1620), Ernst Casimir (1573–1632) und Johann Ernst. after a print by W. J. Delff (1621) after a painting from A. P. van de Venne

Maurice organized the Netherlands' rebellion against Spain into a coherent, successful revolt. Together with Willem Lodewijk, he reorganized the Dutch States Army. He studied military history, strategy and tactics, mathematics and astronomy; and proved himself to be among the best strategists of his age. The Eighty Years' War (1560s to 1648) challenged his style, and he proved himself a good leader by taking several Spanish outposts. Paying special attention to the siege-theories of Simon Stevin (1548-1620), he took valuable key fortresses and towns during a period known as the Ten Glory Years (1588 to 1598): Breda in 1590, Zutphen and Knodsenburg in 1591, Steenwijk and Coevorden in 1592, Geertruidenberg in 1593, and Groningen in 1594. In 1597 he went on a further offensive and took Rheinberg, Meurs, Groenlo, Bredevoort, Enschede, Ootmarsum, and Oldenzaal, and closed off the year with the capture of Lingen. These victories rounded out the borders of the Dutch Republic, solidifying the revolt and allowing a national state to develop behind secure borders. They also established Maurice as the foremost general of his time. Many of the great generals of the succeeding generation, including his brother Frederick Henry and many of the commanders in the English Civil War of 1642 to 1651 learned their trade under his command.

His victories in the pitched battles at Turnhout (1597) and at Nieuwpoort (1600) depended on his innovation of cooperation between arms, with his cavalry playing a major role. The victories earned him military fame and acknowledgement throughout Europe. Despite these successes, the House of Orange did not attain great respect among European royalty, as the Stadtholdership was not inheritable.

The training of his army was especially important to early-modern warfare and to the Military Revolution of 1560–1650. Previous generals had made use of drill and exercise in order to instill discipline or to keep their men physically fit, but for Maurice, they "were the fundamental postulates of tactics".

This change affected the entire conduct of warfare, since it required the officers to train men (in addition to leading them), decreased the size of the basic infantry unit for functional purposes (since more specific orders had to be given in battle, and the decrease in herd behavior required more initiative and intelligence from the average soldier). One major contribution was the introduction of volley fire, which enabled soldiers to compensate for the inaccuracy of their weapons by firing in a large group. It was first used in European combat at the battle of Nieuwpoort in 1600.

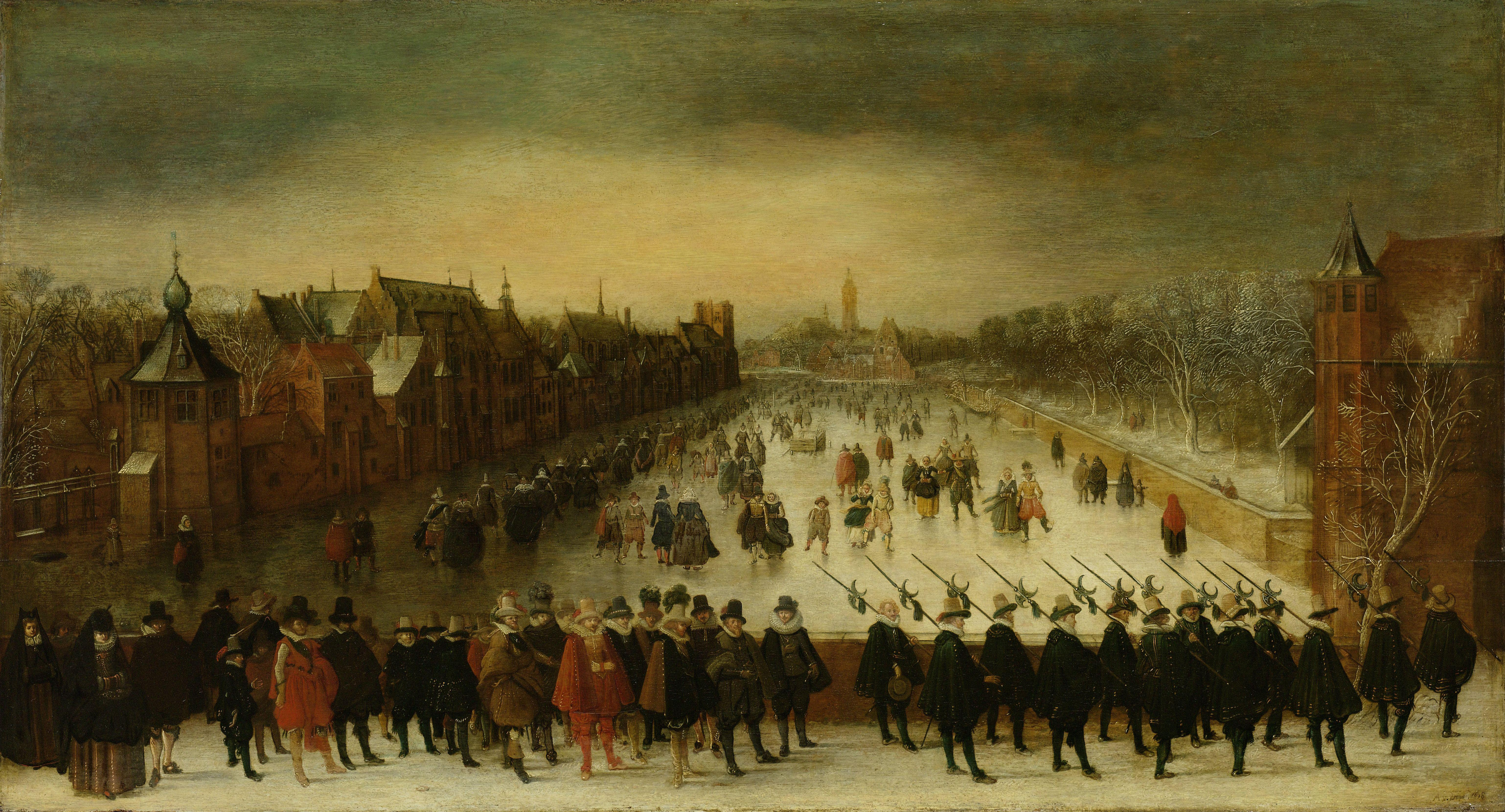
Maurice and his followers on the Vijverberg (the Hofvijver embankment) in The Hague. Adam van Breen, 1618.

As part of his efforts to find allies against Spain, Maurice received Moroccan envoys such as Al-Hajari. They discussed the possibility of an alliance between Holland, the Ottoman Empire, Morocco and the Moriscos, against the common enemy: Spain. Al-Hajari's journey chronicles, authored in 1637, mention in detail the discussion for a combined offensive against Spain.

Maurice gained a reputation in his time and among historians as the first general of his age. His fame rests not as much on his ability to win and exploit field battles as it does on his expertise as a siege commander, military organizer, and innovator. Of his two great adversaries, Alexander Farnese, Duke of Parma, and Ambrogio Spinola, Maurice cautiously never allowed himself to be brought to battle with Parma and did not follow up chances to offer Spinola battle with forces in his favour on the Yssel in 1606. He was, however, dealt a defeat by the Spanish general at the battle of Mülheim in October 1605. Based on Maurice's preference for sieges and small-scale actions, historian David Trim states that it is difficult to reach a verdict on his ability as a tactician. Jonathan Israel notes that on one of the rare occasions when he did have to fight a major battle in the open – the 1600 Battle of Nieuwpoort – it did end with a Dutch victory, but this outcome was highly risky, and Maurice took care to extricate his army and to avoid a second such battle.

Maurice founded a whole new school of military professional practice. This pointed the way to the professional armies of the future by reapplying Roman tactics and innovating in the fields of logistics, training, and economics (e.g. paying troops regularly and on time). Many graduates of service under Maurice, such as his nephew, the Marshal Turenne (1611-1675), or his disciples such as King Gustavus Adolphus of Sweden (1594-1632), applied the Mauritian reforms to great effect later in the 17th century.

== Maurice and Van Oldenbarnevelt ==
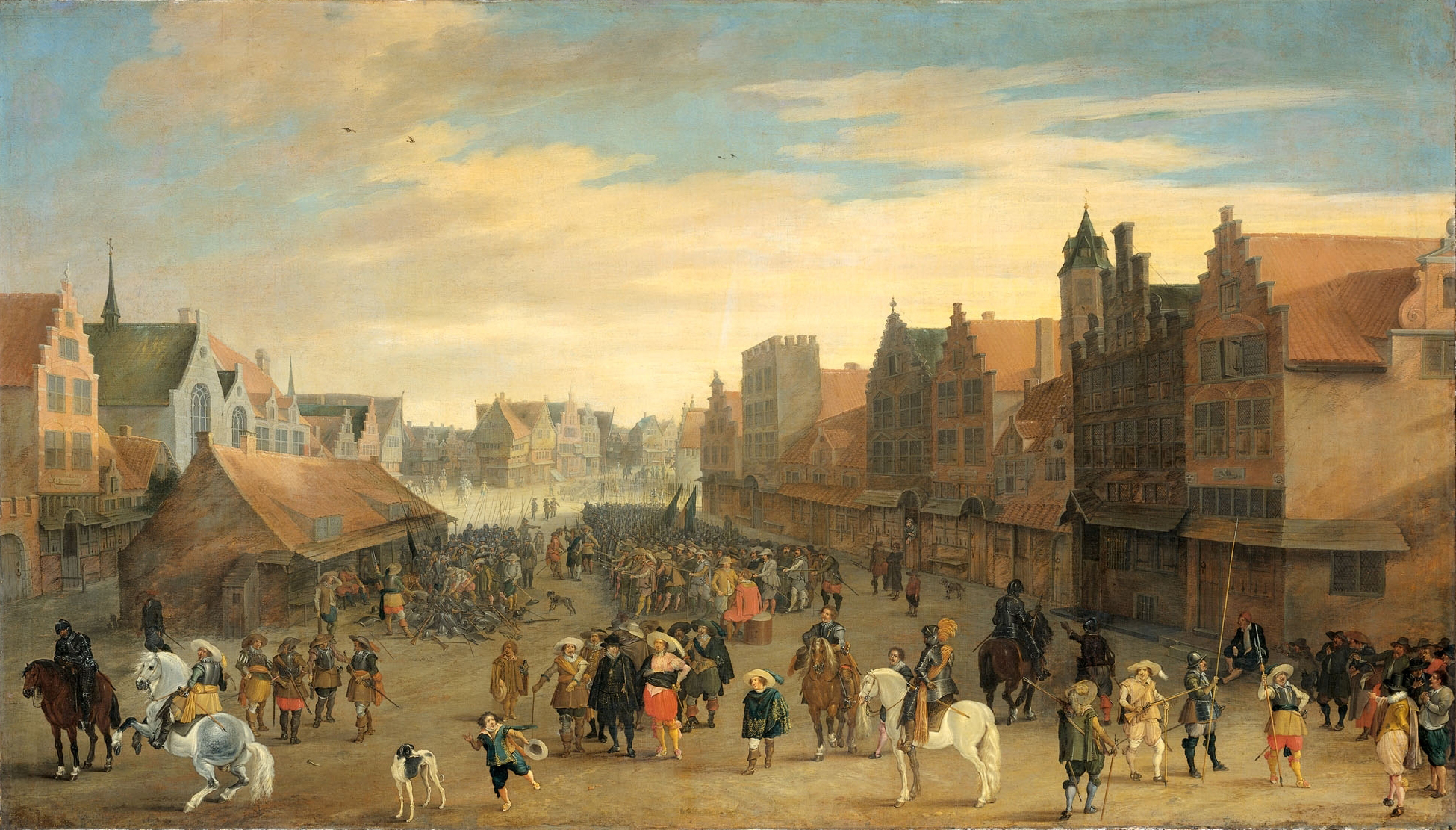
Maurice disbands the waardgelders (municipal mercenary army) on the Neude (town square) in the city of Utrecht on 31 July 1618, a pivotal event in the Remonstrant/Counter-Remonstrant tensions, by Joost Cornelisz Droochsloot

Maurice started out as the protégé of Landsadvocaat (Land's Advocate, i.e. secretary to the nobility of Holland and legal counsel to the States of Holland, but functioning as de facto chief minister of Holland and the States-General) Johan van Oldenbarnevelt, but gradually tensions rose between these two men. Against Maurice's advice, and despite his protests, Van Oldenbarnevelt decided to sign the Twelve Years' Truce with Spain, which lasted from 1609 to 1621. The required funds to maintain the army and navy and the general course of the war were other topics of constant struggle. Contrary to Van Oldenbarnevelt, Maurice was also in favour of shifting power from the provinces to the central government.

Religious troubles between Gomarists (strict Calvinists) and the Remonstrants (Arminians) brought the struggle between Maurice and Van Oldenbarnevelt to a head, with the former backing the Gomarists and the latter the Remonstrants. Maurice had Van Oldenbarnevelt arrested and tried, and he was finally decapitated in 1619 for high treason despite numerous requests for mercy. Important municipal regents such as Jacob Dircksz de Graeff and Cornelis Hooft from Amsterdam were temporarily removed from office by Maurice's powerful supporter Reynier Pauw. From 1618 till his death Maurice now enjoyed uncontested power over the Republic. He expanded the Stadtholder's palace at the Binnenhof in the Hague. The Maurice Tower is now part of the building complex of the Senate of the Netherlands. In 1618, he also succeeded his elder half-brother Philip William as Prince of Orange, a title he seems rarely to have used.

Maurice urged his cadet half brother Frederick Henry to marry in order to preserve the dynasty.

== Thirty Years' and Eighty Years' War ==
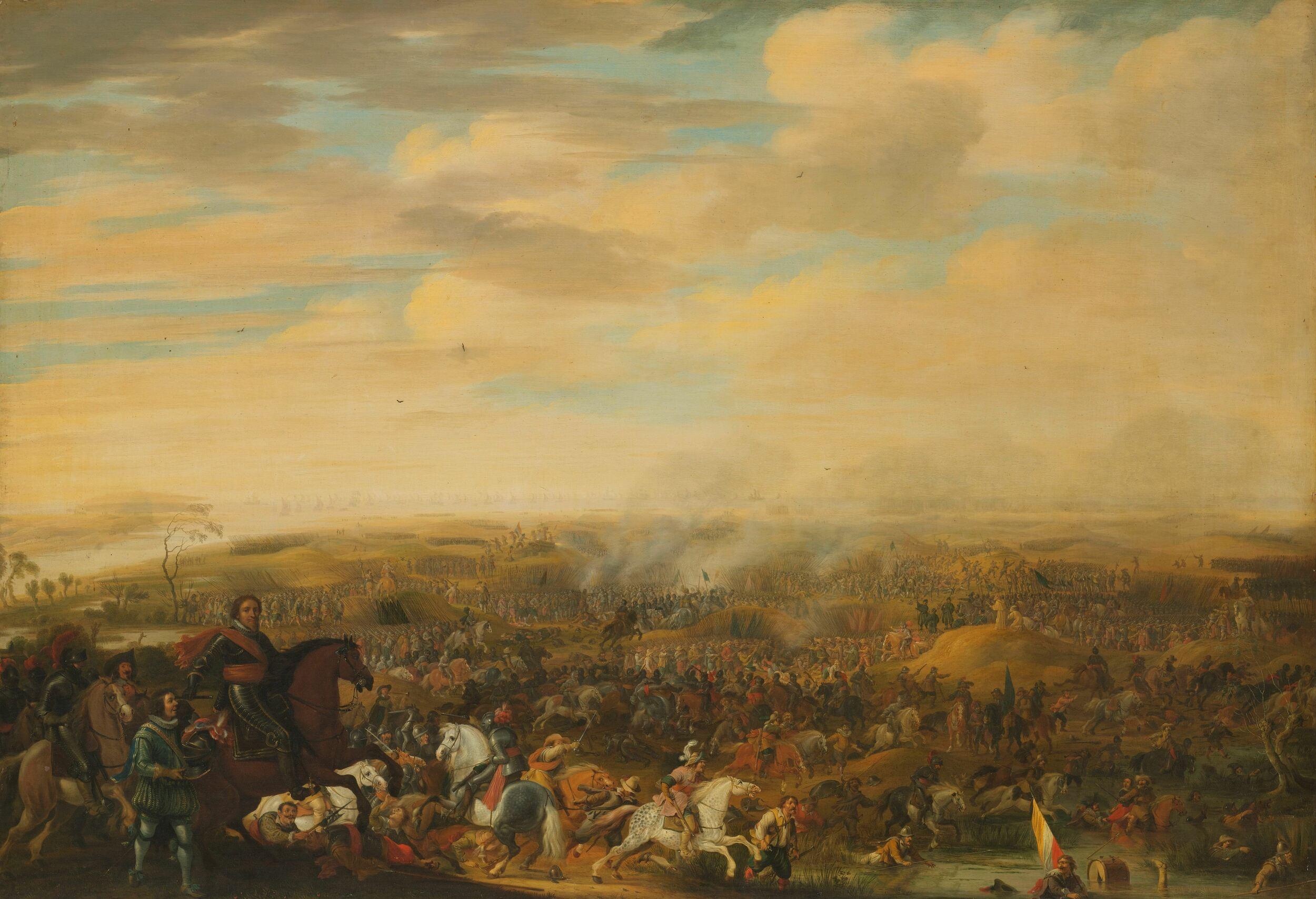
Maurice at the battle of Nieuwpoort, 1600. By Pauwels van Hillegaert

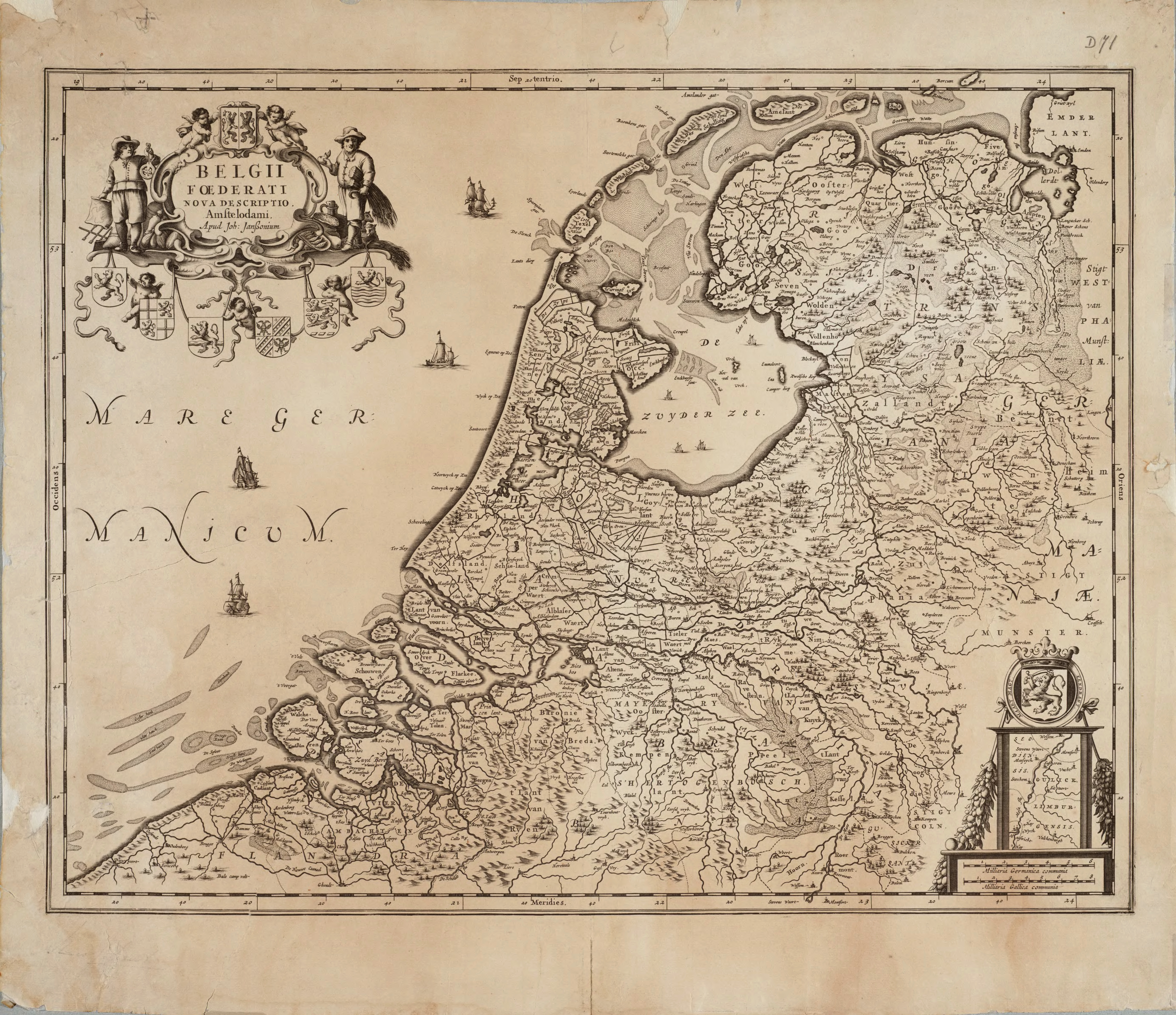
The Seven United Provinces were known as the Netherlands, protagonists of the Eighty Years' War against Spain, from a 1658 map by Janssonius

Historian Jonathan Israel places upon Maurice part of the responsibility for the outbreak of the Thirty Years' War in which Germany was devastated and a large part of its population killed. As noted by Israel, German Protestants were not eager for an all-out confrontation with the Catholics. Maurice significantly helped precipitate such a confrontation by persuading his nephew Frederick V, Elector Palatine, to accept the Bohemian Crown, as well as actively encouraging the Bohemians to confront Habsburg rule, providing them 50,000 guilders as well as sending Dutch troops to fight in the doomed Battle of the White Mountain. This ill-considered decision proved disastrous to the Bohemians, who were thereby plunged into prolonged oppression, and to Frederick who lost his ancestral lands. It also worsened the Dutch Republic's own strategic position.

In 1621 the war with Spain resumed after a 12-year period of truces. The Spanish, led by Ambrogio Spinola, had notable successes, including the Siege of Breda, the old Nassau family residence, in 1625.

Maurice died on 23 April 1625, with the siege still underway. Justin of Nassau surrendered Breda in June 1625 after a costly eleven-month siege.

== List of battles ==
Maurice participated in these battles as principal commander of Dutch forces:

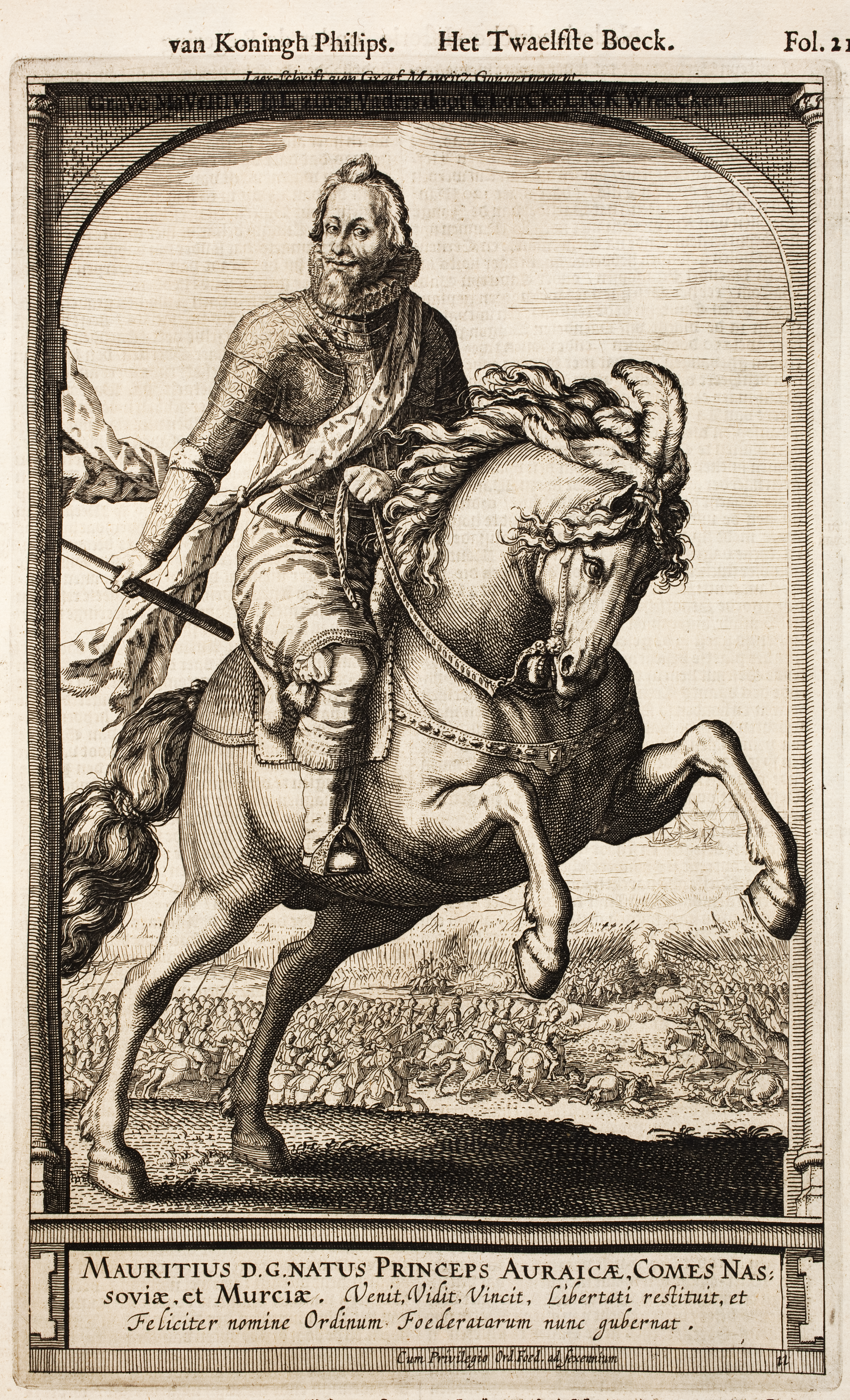
Engraving of Maurice on horseback

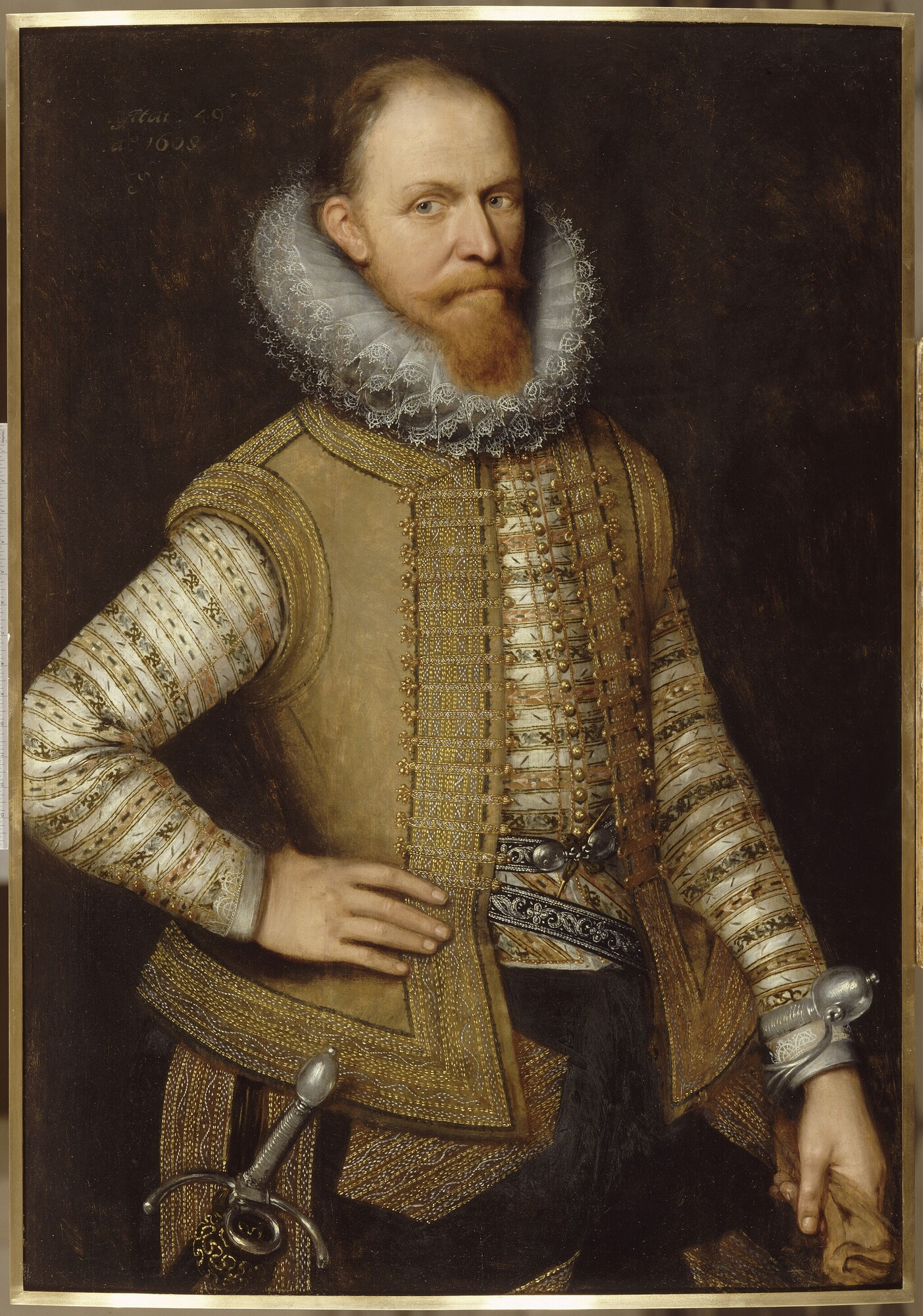
Maurice at the height of his power

Prince Maurice of Nassau
- Axel
- 1st Bergen op Zoom, 1588
- Medemblik, 1588
- 3rd Breda, 1590
- 2nd Steenbergen, 1590
- 3rd Zutphen, 1591
- 2nd Deventer, 1591
- Delfzijl, 1591
- Knodsenburg, 1591
- Hulst, 1591
- Nijmegen, 1591
- Steenwijk, 1592
- 1st Coevorden, 1592
- Gertrudenberg, 1593
- 2nd Coevorden, 1593
- Groningen, 1594
- 2nd Groenlo, 1595
- 1st Hulst, 1596
- Turnhout, 1597
- 2nd Venlo, 1597
- 2nd Rheinberg, 1597
- 1st Meurs, 1597
- 3rd Groenlo, 1597
- 1st Bredevoort, 1597
- Enschede, 1597
- Ootmarsum, 1597
- 1st Oldenzaal, 1597
- 1st Lingen, 1597
- 2nd Meurs, 1598
- 3rd Rheinberg, 1598
- Doetinchem
- Rees, 1599
- Zaltbommel (1599)
- San Andreas
- Nieuwpoort, 1600
- Ostend, 1601
- Siege of 's-Hertogenbosch (1601)
- Siege of Sluis (1604)
- 2nd Oldenzaal, 1605
- 2nd Lingen, 1605
- Mülheim, 1605
- Wachtendonk
- Krakau Castle
- 2nd Bredevoort, 1606
- 4th Rheinberg, 1606
- 4th Groenlo, 1606
- 3rd Venlo, 1606
- Jülich, 1621–22
- 2nd Bergen op Zoom, 1622
- 3rd Steenbergen, 1622
- 4th Breda, 1624

== Namesakes ==
- The island nation of Mauritius, located in the Indian Ocean, was named after him. The island was named in the prince's honour by Wybrant Warwijck in 1598 and Dutch emigrants first settled it in May 1638.
- In 1611, the Dutch variously named what is now known as the Hudson River the Mauritius River or the Mauritz River, in honour of the prince. It was also similarly referred to as the Nassau River.

== Coat of arms and titles ==
The coat of arms used by Maurice showing the county of Moers (top left center and bottom right center) and his mother's arms of Saxony (center)

Maurice, besides being stadtholder of several provinces and Captain-General, both non-hereditary and appointive titles, was the hereditary sovereign of the principality of Orange in what is today Provence in France. He also was the lord of many other estates, which formed his wealth:

- Marquis of Veere and Vlissingen
- Count of Nassau-Dillenburg, Buren, Leerdam, Katzenelnbogen, and Vianden
- Viscount of Antwerp and Besançon
- Baron of Aggeris, Breda, Cranendonck, Lands of Cuijk, Daesburg, Eindhoven, City of Grave, Lek, IJsselstein, Diest, Grimbergen, Herstal, Warneton, Beilstein (Westerwald), Bentheim-Lingen, Moers, Arlay, and Nozeroy; Lord of Dasburg, Geertruidenberg, Hooge en Lage Zwaluwe, Klundert, Montfort, Naaldwijk, Niervaart, Polanen, Steenbergen, Sint-Maartensdijk, Willemstad, Bütgenbach, Sankt Vith, and Besançon.

During his lifetime he kept using the arms as during his father's life-time shown here, and never changed to the simpler arms used by his father and half brothers.

== Descendants ==
Maurice never married but was the father of several illegitimate children:

by Margaretha van Mechelen:

- Willem of Nassau, Lord of the Lek (1601–1627)
- Louis of Nassau, Lord of De Lek and Beverweerd (Lodewijk) (1604–1665)
- Maurice (Maurits) (1604 – 5 June 1617)

by Cornelia Jacobsdochter:

- Anna (?–11 June 1673) married François de Ferrier

by Ursula de Rijck:

- Elisabeth (1611–1679)
- Karl (Carel) (ca. 1612 – 28 March 1637) died during the battle in Brazil.

by Anna van de Kelder:

- Karl (Carel) Maurice

by Deliana de Backer:

- Eleonora (?–1673)

== See also ==
- Dutch Empire (begun during his reign, circa 1603–1605)

Maurice, Prince of Orange House of Orange-Nassau Cadet branch of the House of Nassau Born: 14 November 1567 Died: 23 April 1625
Regnal titles
Preceded by Philip William	Prince of Orange; Baron of Breda; 1618–1625	Succeeded by Frederick Henry
Political offices
Preceded by William of Orange	Stadtholder of Holland and Zeeland; 1585–1625	Succeeded by Frederick Henry
Preceded by Adolf van Nieuwenaar	Stadtholder of Utrecht, Guelders and Overijssel; 1590–1625	Succeeded by Frederick Henry
Preceded by William Louis	Stadtholder of Groningen; 1620–1625	Succeeded by Ernst Casimir
