= Siege of Oldenzaal (1597) =

1597 siege during the Eighty Years' War

- Part of the Eighty Years' War and the Anglo–Spanish War
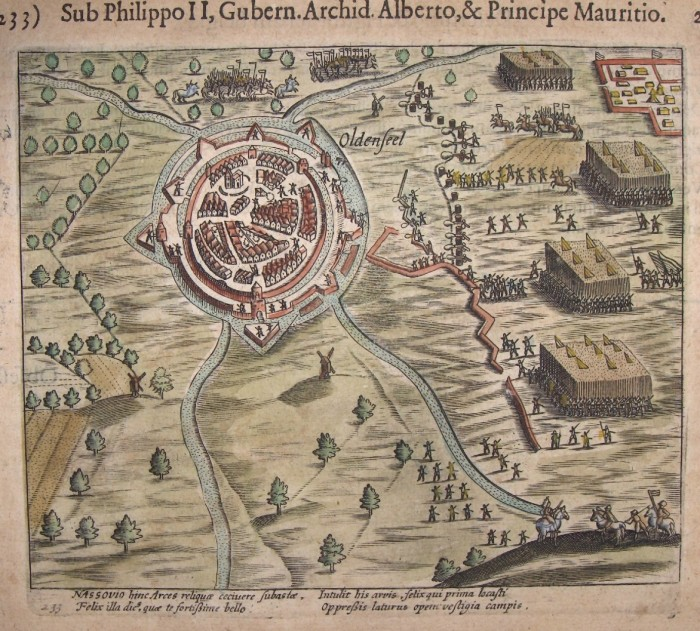
- Siege of Oldenzaal in 1597
Date	20 to 23 October 1597
Location	Oldenzaal; Present day the Netherlands 52°18′45″N 6°55′45″E
Result	Dutch and English victory

Belligerents
Dutch Republic; England	(Spain) Spanish Empire

Commanders and leaders
(Dutch Republic) Maurice of Orange (England) Horace Vere	(Spain) Frederick Van Boymer

Strength
4,000 infantry & cavalry	400

Casualties and losses
Low	All captured
- Location within Netherlands Siege of Oldenzaal (1597) (North Sea)

The siege of Oldenzaal was a short siege that took place during the Eighty Years' War and the Anglo–Spanish War by a Dutch and English army led by Maurice of Orange of the city of Oldenzaal from 20 to 23 October 1597. The city surrendered to the overwhelming Dutch and English force. The siege was part of Maurice's campaign of 1597 known as the Ten Glory Years, his highly successful offensive against the Spaniards.

== Background ==
In the year 1597 Maurice had launched an offensive and so far had had a very successful campaign in the east of the Netherlands. Earlier that year he had captured all the cities in the area Rheinberg, Meurs, Grol and Bredevoort. The last two sieges were fierce and the capture of Bredevoort even led to a sacking of the city. Maurice then moved on the city of Enschede where the place surrendered soon afterward.

Maurice then split his force in order to complete the simultaneous capture of the towns of Oldenzaal and Ootmasrum - Captain Van Duivenvoorde was sent with part of the army which included English and Scots under Nicholas Parker from Enschede to Ootmarsum which also surrendered. Maurice along with his cousin (and brother-in-law) William Louis meanwhile drew his portion of the army some 4,000 strong to Oldenzaal with the rest of the English troops under Horace Vere.

Since 1572 Oldenzaal had been in the hands of the Spaniards with the Catholic Church deeply rooted and every year a procession celebrated the Beggars being expelled from Oldenzaal. Oldenzaal's defenses consisted of a main wall surrounding the city, six bastions, a moat, and an earthen rampart, however some of the work on rebuilding the defenses was left unfinished.

== Siege and aftermath ==
The city was defended by six companies of approximately 400 men under Governor Frederick Boymer. They only had one large gun at their disposal and could hardly do anything against the number of Maurice, who with his Dutch and English troops had encamped north of Oldenzaal.

The siege commenced soon after but the town replied with cannon and matchlock causing some of the besiegers to run away from their incomplete siege works leaving the gabions unfilled. The setback was only temporary and the Spanish garrison, realizing they were outnumbered, began to negotiate terms with an honorable surrender. Terms were signed with the governor and the clergy and the Spanish garrison were thus allowed to leave for Lingen with full honors and the following day Maurice marched his triumphant troops into the city.

After having seized Oldenzaal and Ootmarusm the forces rejoined and Maurice then marched to Lingen and captured that city as well, ending the highly successful campaign for the year. The conquests of Oldenzaal and Lingen were a great achievement for Maurice during this successful period, known as the Ten Glory years and strengthened the eastern boundaries of the Republic.

In 1605 Ambrogio Spinola captured the city for Spain but it was regained again in 1626 by Frederick Henry and stayed permanently in Dutch hands.

== See also ==
- List of stadtholders in the Low Countries
- List of governors of the Spanish Netherlands
- Capture of Enschede (1597)
- Siege of Groenlo (1597)
