= Capture of Enschede (1597) =

Siege in the Eighty Year's War

- Part of the Eighty Years' War and the Anglo–Spanish War
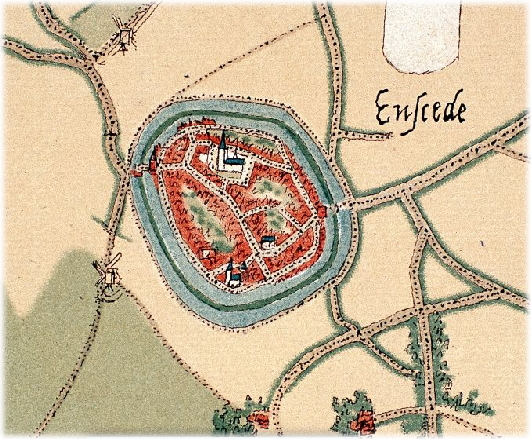
- Plan of Enschede c. 1570
Date	18 and 19 October 1597
Location	Enschede, Overijssel (Present day Netherlands)
Result	Dutch and English victory

Belligerents
Dutch Republic; England	(Spain) Spanish Empire

Commanders and leaders
(Dutch Republic) Maurice of Orange (England) Horace Vere	(Spain) Lieutenant Van Grootveld

Strength
6,700 infantry & cavalry	120

Casualties and losses
Unknown	All captured

The capture of Enschede took place during the Eighty Years' War and the Anglo–Spanish War on 18 and 19 October 1597. A Dutch and English army led by Maurice of Orange took the city after a very short siege and threatening that they would destroy the city. The siege was part of Maurice's campaign of 1597, a successful offensive against the Spaniards during what the Dutch call the Ten Glory Years.

After the siege and capture of Bredevoort, a part of Maurice's army, which included Scots and Frisians under Count Solms and Van Duivenvoorde, went from Winterswijk to Gronau. On 18 October, Prince Maurice, along with his cousin (and brother-in-law) William Louis, followed the cavalry and the artillery that had been in service at Bredevoort, which had been moved the day before. They were followed by the main body consisting of English troops under Colonel Horace Vere and the Frisians, while the companies of Duivenvoorde, Brederode, and the English cavalry formed the rearguard.

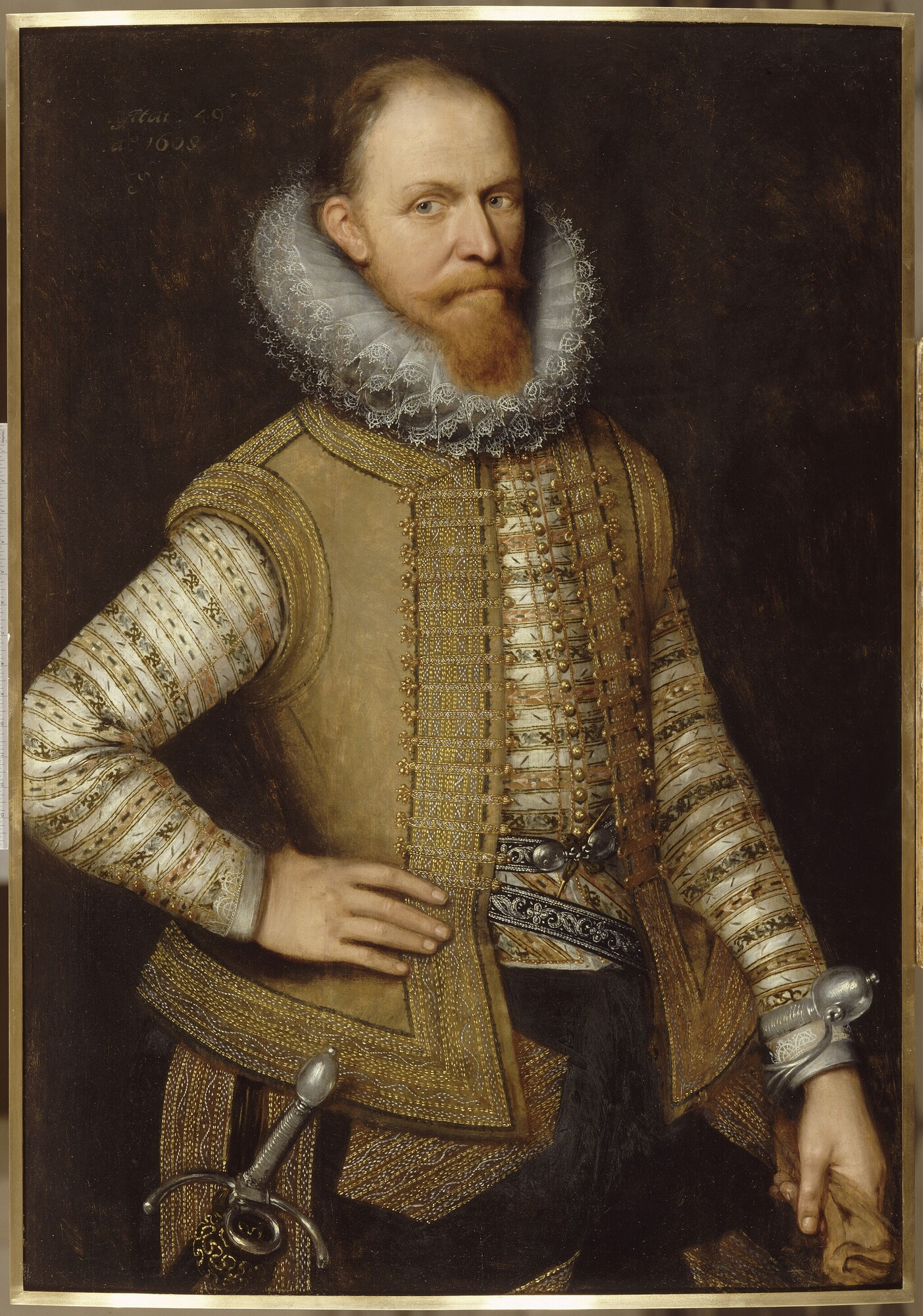
Maurice of Orange

== Siege and capture ==
Halfway to Enschede, at Glanerbrug, Maurice ordered the army into battle formation and headed towards the city. By this time the artillery had arrived and a formal siege could commence. Shots were fired at the city walls for a day, after which Maurice sent a trumpeter to the gate, demanding surrender. Maurice threatened that his army would give Enschede the same fate that happened at Bredevoort and Groenlo, which were burnt and ravaged in the ensuing chaos of the assault. Maurice threatened that he would 'break the heads of them all if he fired a single shot with the artillery.'

The governor lieutenant Grootveld and the garrison commander Captain Vasques requested permission to examine the artillery threatening the city. Maurice agreed, the inspection was made and, after some discussion with the clergy in the city, they accepted Maurice's terms as an "absolutely fair condition". The Spanish garrison, led by two companies totaling 108 men, then marched out of the city. A company of Dutch then garrisoned the place, upon which the company commander Jaques Meurs was made governor. Maurice ordered the fortifications largely dismantled so that the city would be no longer suitable for future military occupants and then marched to the city of Oldenzaal and took the place after a short siege. A contingent of Dutch and English soldiers, led by Captain Van Duivenvoorde, split from the main army, heading northeast to take Ootmarsum.

== See also ==
- List of stadtholders in the Low Countries
- List of governors of the Spanish Netherlands
- Siege of Bredevoort (1597)
- Siege of Groenlo (1597)
