= Siege of Lingen (1597) =

Siege during 80 year's war

- Part of the Eighty Years' War and the Anglo–Spanish War
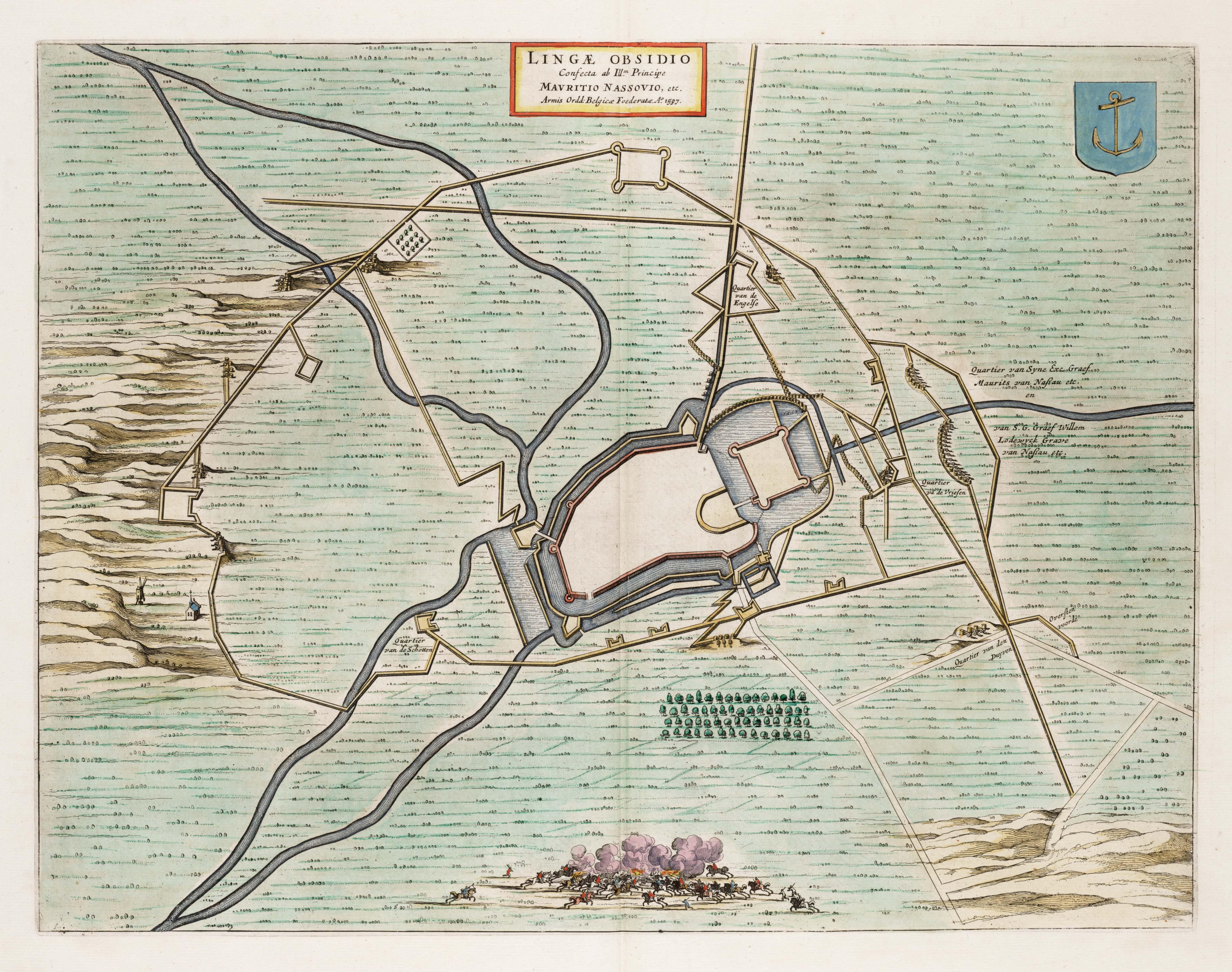
- Siege of Lingen in 1597 from the Atlas Van Loon
Date	25 October 1597 – 12 November 1597
Location	Lingen (present-day Germany) 52°31′24″N 7°19′02″E
Result	Dutch and English victory

Belligerents
Dutch Republic; England	(Spain) Spanish Empire

Commanders and leaders
(Dutch Republic) Maurice of Orange (England) Horace Vere	(Spain) Frederik van den Bergh

Strength
6,000 infantry & cavalry	500

Casualties and losses
Unknown	All captured
- Location within Lower Saxony Siege of Lingen (1597) (Germany)

The siege of Lingen took place during the Eighty Years' War and the Anglo–Spanish War by a Dutch and English army led by Maurice of Orange. Frederik van den Bergh defended Lingen for Philip II of Spain which was besieged from 25 October 1597. After a siege of more than two weeks, Van den Bergh surrendered on 12 November 1597. The siege was part of Maurice's successful 1597 campaign against the Spaniards.

== Background ==
Maurice had already achieved many successes in the year of 1597 which started off with the victory at Turnhout. Afterwards he started a campaign in the summer through the east of the Netherlands and took important fortified strongholds which included Oldenzaal and Groenlo from the Spanish. His campaign was coming to a successful conclusion and only Lingen was still in Spanish hands. By the end of October 1597 Maurice and his army arrived at Lingen and by taking the city the Spanish would have no choice but to abandon the region of Twente as a whole. The town was situated at the extreme boundary of the Low Countries (in present-day Germany), governed by Frederik van den Bergh which was defended by 500 men under Lieutenant Verdugo .

Maurice's army which included English and Scots under Horace Vere had left the recently captured Oldenzaal and had to cross the Ems river which they achieved without incident. Horace's brother Francis Vere was now governor of Brill and general of Elizabeth I's forces in the Netherlands. The heavy artillery was brought to Lingen by ship through the Wadden Sea and then through the Ems river. This caused several days of delay but once the big guns were in use they would be able to shell the fortifications and city.

== Siege and aftermath ==
As the siege started the garrison made a brisk sortie and burnt a mill but they were driven back by the English and Scots who were at the head of the attack. It took a lot of effort to get the big guns dug in by the canal under fire, so that the city would be besieged proper. They were soon put in use however and the towns fortified walls were pounded. With the situation now desperate Van den Bergh was hoping for news of a relieving army but the only news he was to receive from the Cardinal Archduke Albert was to save the city. Thus with no hope of relief Van den Burgh surrendered Lingen to Maurice on 12 November.

By capturing Lingen, Maurice closed off the campaign of 1597 and was just one of his latest conquests during this successful period, called the Ten Glory Years. The Spanish abandoned Twente as had been expected and military activity ended for the year. Maurice had taken nine strongly fortified cities and five castles, opened the navigation of the Rhine, and strengthened the whole eastern bulwarks of the Republic.

Lingen would be recaptured eight years later by Ambrosio Spinola in his campaign of 1605.

== See also ==
- List of stadtholders in the Low Countries
- List of governors of the Spanish Netherlands
- Siege of Bredevoort (1597)
- Siege of Groenlo (1597)
