= Siege of Bredevoort (1597) =

1597 siege

Siege of Bredevoort in 1597
- Part of the Eighty Years' War
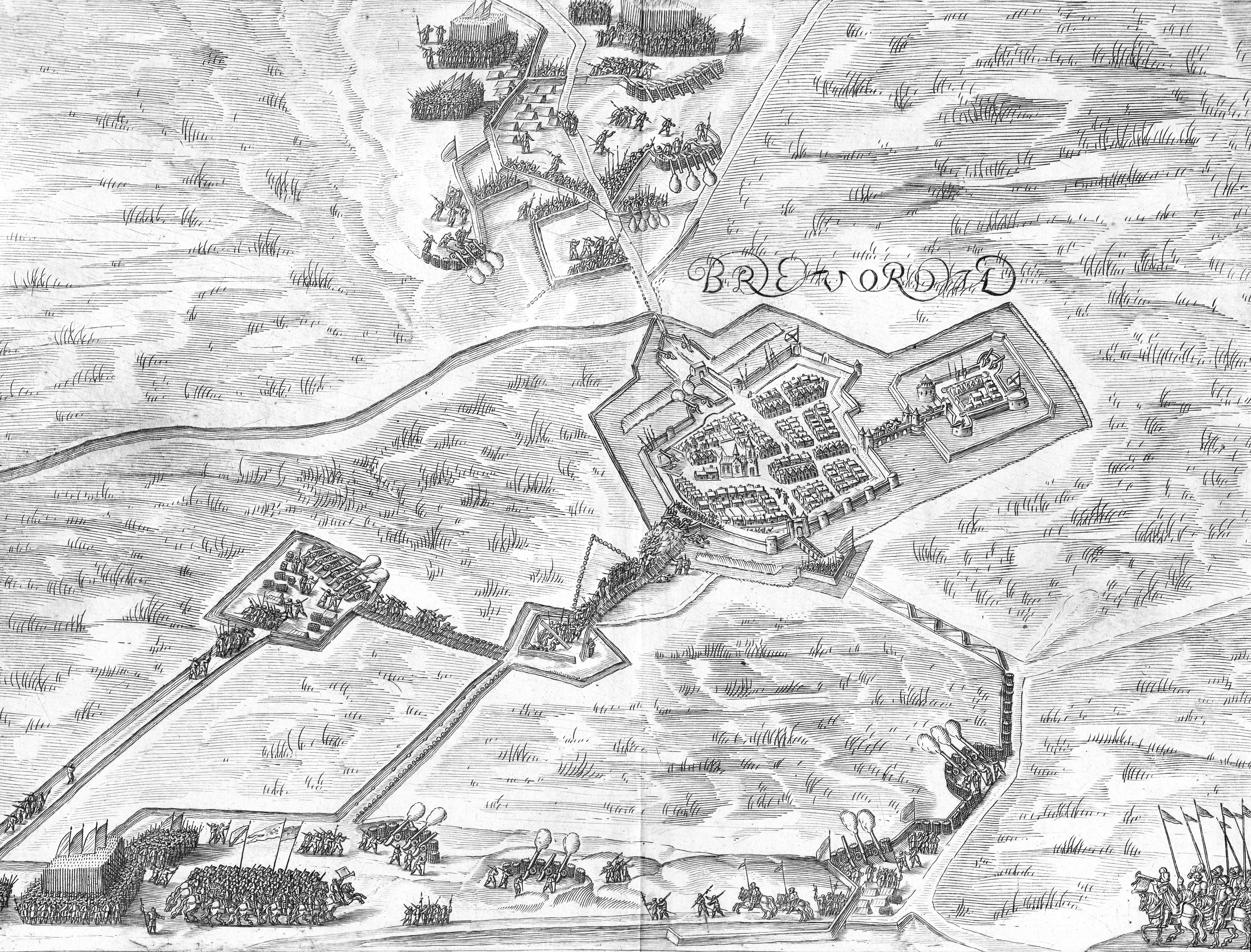
- Map of the siege of Bredevoort 1597
Date	1–10 October 1597
Location	Bredevoort, Gelderland (present-day the Netherlands)
Result	Batavo-English victory

Belligerents
Dutch Republic; England	(Spain) Spanish Empire

Commanders and leaders
(Dutch Republic) Maurice of Nassau	(Spain) Damien Gardot

Strength
6,000 infantry 1,200 cavalry	200 infantry (Bredevoort); 40 cavalry (Bredevoort)

Casualties and losses
Unknown	80

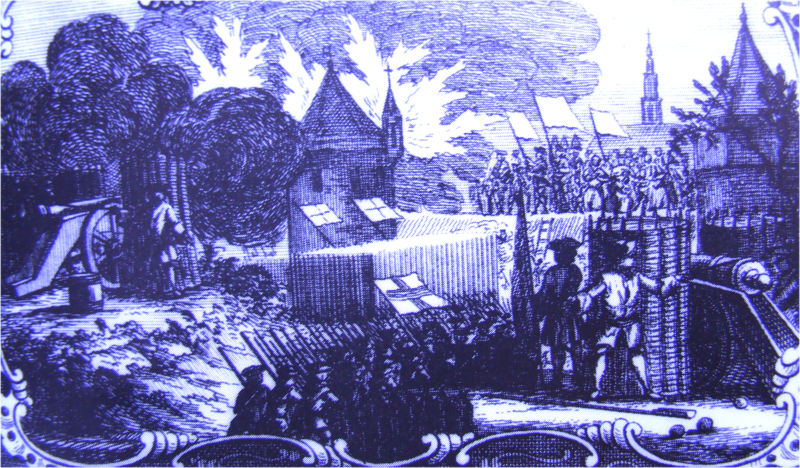
English troops attacking the Alter gate

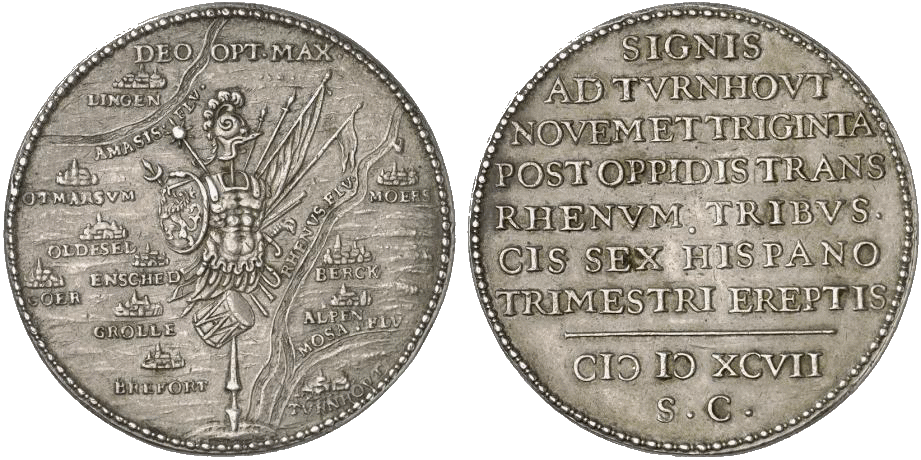
Commemorative coin of the campaign with the conquered cities Turnhout, Alphen, Rijnberk, Meurs, Bredevoort, Groenlo, Goor, Enschede, Oldenzaal, Ootmarsum, and Lingen

The siege of Bredevoort in 1597 was a siege of Bredevoort by the military forces led by Maurice of Nassau, Prince of Orange, during the Eighty Years War and the Anglo-Spanish War. The siege lasted from 1 October until 9 October; after that day Bredevoort was occupied by the besiegers. The siege was part of a campaign during which Maurice conquered the cities Turnhout, Alphen, Rijnberk, Meurs, Bredevoort, Groenlo, Goor, Enschede, Oldenzaal, Ootmarsum, and Lingen.

== Events ==
Bredevoort was defended by only two companies of soldiers (200), led by a French captain Damien Gardot and his lieutenant Van Broeckhuysen, as Count Hendrik van den Bergh and his supporting troops were absent. Bredevoort was considered impregnable, the city was surrounded by swamps which made it very difficult to get guns within shooting range. Maurice was advancing towards the city with 6,000 troops and 1,200 cavalry which included 13 companies of English troops under Horace Vere. To tackle the swamps Maurice had brought a new invention: a bridge of cork. These bridges were light and mobile and had not been previously used. The bridge proved successful and made it possible to get the guns nearby to fire successfully at the walls. Finally, a large breach in the wall was made which meant that Maurice's troops could storm the city. A bloody battle ensued and the defenders retreated to the castle. Maurice's soldiers ransacked the town for two days, which was followed by negotiations to surrender. The defenders under Gardot agreed to the terms and were allowed on payment of ransom to leave the city.

One of Maurice's troops looking for loot in the night knocked a candle which then ignited a bundle of hay which then set fire to the building. What followed was a huge fire which engulfed much of the city - only twenty houses were spared. Citizens fled to the castle while many soldiers fled the city. Maurice was angry about the incident but used the burning as a message, it was thought that it would be a deterrent to other cities on the approach of Maurice.

Following the consolidation of the town, Maurice then went on to take Enschede and this time the city was spared destruction.

== Sources ==
- H.A. Hauer: in Breevoort can ick vergeten niet page 25-28, Publicer: De Graafschap, 1956
- De Opstand in de Nederlanden
- Staring Instituut: Bredevoort een Heerlijkheid, ISBN 90-900213-5-3 (first edition 1988)
- Staatkundige historie van Holland: Benevens de Maandelijksche ..., Volumes 24-27 Amsterdam, Holland : Bernardus Mourik
