= Siege of Groenlo (1597) =

Medieval European military campaign

- Part of the Eighty Years' War
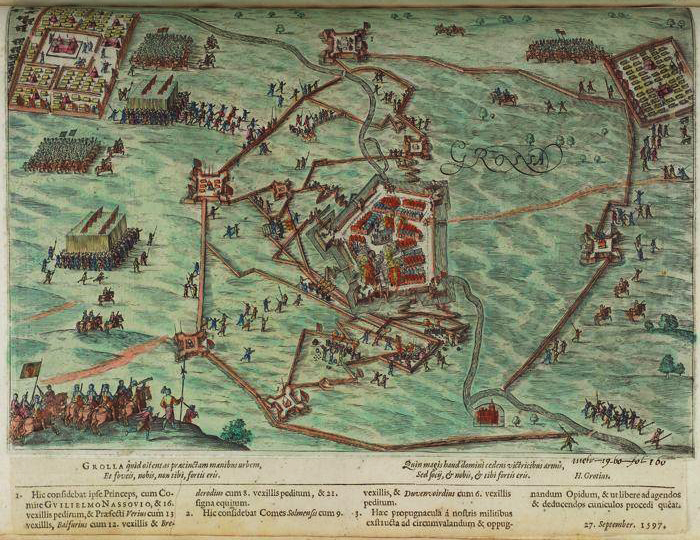
- Depiction of the siege of Grol by Maurice in 1597
Date	11–28 September 1597
Location	Groenlo, Gelderland (present-day the Netherlands) 52°03′00″N 6°37′00″E
Result	Dutch-English victory

Belligerents
Dutch Republic; England	(Spain) Spanish Empire

Commanders and leaders
(Dutch Republic) Maurice of Nassau (England) Horace Vere	(Spain) Jan van Stirum

Strength
6,000 infantry 1,400 cavalry 14 artillery pieces	800 infantry 300 cavalry
- Location within Netherlands Siege of Groenlo (1597) (North Sea)

The siege of Groenlo was a siege of Groenlo during the Eighty Years' War and the Anglo–Spanish War by a Dutch and English army led by Maurice of Nassau after it had followed an unsuccessful siege by Maurice in 1595.

== History ==
The siege lasted from 11 to 28 September 1597 and ended in the town's capture from its Spanish garrison.

After the capture the troops moved to take Bredevoort and formed part of Maurice's successful offensives against the Spanish in 1597.

Groenlo was then held by the States until a siege in 1606 by Ambrosio Spinola.
