= Eighty Years' War, 1579–1588 =

Fourth phase of the Eighty Years' War

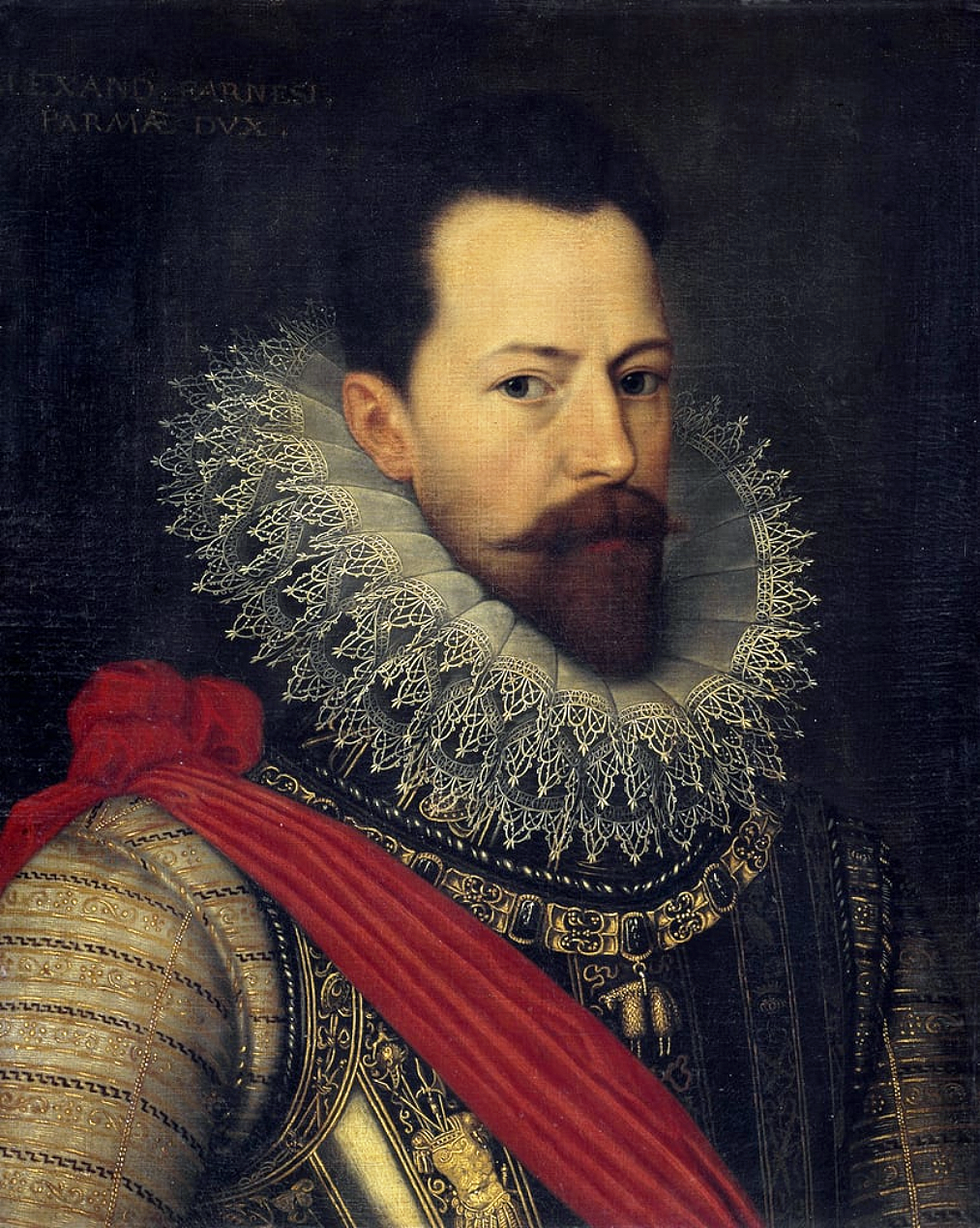
Under Parma's command, the Spanish Army reconquered large parts of the Netherlands in the 1580s.

The years 1579–1588 constituted a phase of the Eighty Years' War (c. 1568–1648) between the Spanish Empire and the United Provinces in revolt after most of them concluded the Union of Utrecht on 23 January 1579, and proceeded to carve the independent Dutch Republic out of the Habsburg Netherlands. It followed the 1576–1579 period, in which a temporary alliance of 16 out of the Seventeen Provinces' States–General established the Pacification of Ghent (8 November 1576) as a joint Catholic–Protestant rebellion against the Spanish government, but internal conflicts as well as military and diplomatic successes of the Spanish Governors-General Don Juan of Austria and Alexander Farnese, Duke of Parma split them apart, finally leading the Malcontent County of Artois, County of Hainaut and city of Douai to sign the Union of Arras on 6 January 1579, reverting to Catholicism and loyalty to the Spanish crown.

In response, most of the remaining rebel provinces and cities would forge or later accede to the Union of Utrecht, a closer military alliance treaty that would go on to become the most important fundamental law of the United Provinces, who on 26 July 1581 proclaimed the Act of Abjuration, a de facto declaration of independence from Spain. Initially, the nascent polity was struggling to find a new sovereign head of state, including Matthias of Austria, Francis of Anjou, Robert of Leicester, and William "the Silent" of Orange, who was assassinated in 1584. After that, the search for a sovereign head of state was given up and it was decided to become the Dutch Republic by the instruction of 12 April 1588. Meanwhile, the Duke of Parma continued his successful military and diplomatic offensive, bringing ever more provinces and cities in the southern, eastern and northeastern parts of the Netherlands back into royalist hands.

Parma's reconquests more or less stalled after the Fall of Antwerp (1585), and finally came to an end with the failure of the Spanish Armada (July–August 1588) and Philip II ordered him to intervene in the French Wars of Religion (September 1589) to prevent the Succession of Henry IV and France becoming a Protestant kingdom. These developments gave rise to a new phase, the Ten Years (1588–1598), that saw significant conquests by the Dutch States Army under the leadership of stadtholders Maurice of Nassau and William Louis of Nassau-Dillenburg, and the Dutch Republic's rise as a commercial great power.

== Historiography ==
Union of Utrecht: the rebel United Provinces that declared independence in 1581, and became the Dutch Republic in 1588 Spanish-controlled territories 1579 Rebel territories reconquered by Parma during 1579–1588 French–Dutch/German language border

Scholars have somewhat differing views on the periodisation of this phase of the Eighty Years' War. Whereas Encarta Winkler Prins (2002) subsumed the 1579–1588 years into its larger "Second period: the rupture (1576–1588)", and Mulder et al. (2008) into their even longer "The North on the way to autonomy, 1573–1588" period, Groenveld (2009) regarded 1575/6–1579 as a separate period of 'three years of moderation' in which William of Orange had attempted to establish 'general religious peace', while the Union of Utrecht marked (or coincided with) the beginning of 'a new phase of violence, in which Parma with the help of his troops and with diplomacy returned ever more southern provinces to the obedience of Philip II.' (Note: 'A first radical phase continued until 1575–1576, and found its violent peak in the years after 1572. (...) But in 1575, a phase of moderaton commenced, because moderates on [both] loyal and rebel sides stepped forward, who strove towards a solution through negotiations. (...) An attempted negotiation in Breda failed, however...(...) But in November 1576 (...) the parties in Ghent did reach an agreement.' 'It was not until later in the year [1579] that [William of Orange] agreed with the Union [of Utrecht] when faced with a lack of alternatives. He was also compelled to do so, because after three years of moderation a new phase of violence, in which Parma with the help of his troops and with diplomacy returned ever more southern provinces to the obedience of Philip II.') Similarly, van der Lem (1995) marked 1576 as 'the year of the general Revolt against Spain', and 1579 as 'the year of the separation of the Netherlands into the Unions of Atrecht and Utrecht', describing the intervening 1576–1579 period as one in which 'the middle party' enjoyed 'brief success' through the Pacification of Ghent. (Note: 'The brief success of the middle party. The Pacification of Ghent had been able to hold all provinces together for not even three years. Thereby concluding that it was doomed to fail is easy with hindsight. It would be all too easy to jump from the Pacification of Ghent in 1576 to 1579, the year of the separation of the Netherlands into the Unions of Atrecht and Utrecht.' (...) 'In 1576, the year of the general Revolt against Spain...')

Although there is general agreement that the phase of the conflict that began in 1579 (or earlier) ended in or around 1588, scholars disagree about the reasons and the exact moment when it concluded. Groenveld (2009) focused on the institutional and political aspects of the instruction of 12 April 1588, by which the United Provinces formally became the Dutch Republic: a state without monarch at its head, but sovereign Provincial States. (Note: 'Around 1588, the Revolt's character changed radically. Far-reaching constitutional amendments took place (...) The definitive moment was reached on 12 April 1588, when the officials were released from their oath to Leicester and came under the oath of the new government. The Republic of United Netherlands had emerged: the unexpected result of an unplanned process of state formation.') In military terms, he described the 1585–1589 years as more of a transitional period marked by a series of three Spanish setbacks (Parma's offensive stalling in 1585, the 1588 destruction of the Spanish Armada, and Philip II's 1589 order to Parma to intervene in France), 'developments which gave the Republic an unexpected breather.' Winkler Prins also ended its 1576–1588 period with the establishment of the Republic, stating: 'In the meantime, the development towards a 'Confederation of States' of seven provinces, each sovereign for itself, the Republic of the United Netherlands, continued. In general, 1588 is taken as its tentative end point.' Mulder et al. (2008) also implied that the emergence of the Republic in 1588 meant the end of their 1573–1588 period, but denied that any formal act or proclamation marked its establishment. (Note: 'The Republic of the Seven United Netherlands emerged in 1588. Remarkably, there has never been an official decision, or a proclamation issued. The Republic arose though the course of events and the growing power of the States.') Robert Fruin's 1857 classic study on the 1588–1598 period, which he named the "Ten Years", mentioned the Republic's origins in 1588 only in passing (Chapter IV). To Fruin, the turning point was a military one: the destruction of the Spanish Armada (Chapter II) began the 'adversity which Philip would suffer almost without interruptions from now on, which is to be attributed more to his own mistakes than the cooperation of his enemies. (...) The attack on England, waged recklessly, fell apart, and prevented the submission of the Netherlands.' Van der Lem (1995) regarded the assassination of William of Orange in 1584 as a turning point, arguing that his political and religious ideals died with him, while noting that Henri Pirenne downplayed the significance of William's death in view of Parma's seemingly unstoppable military advance. (Note: 'The Belgian historian Henri Pirenne qualified the murder of William as a useless crime. After all, in his last years, the prince was unable to cope with the advance of Parma.')

== Events and developments ==
=== 1579: Union of Arras ===
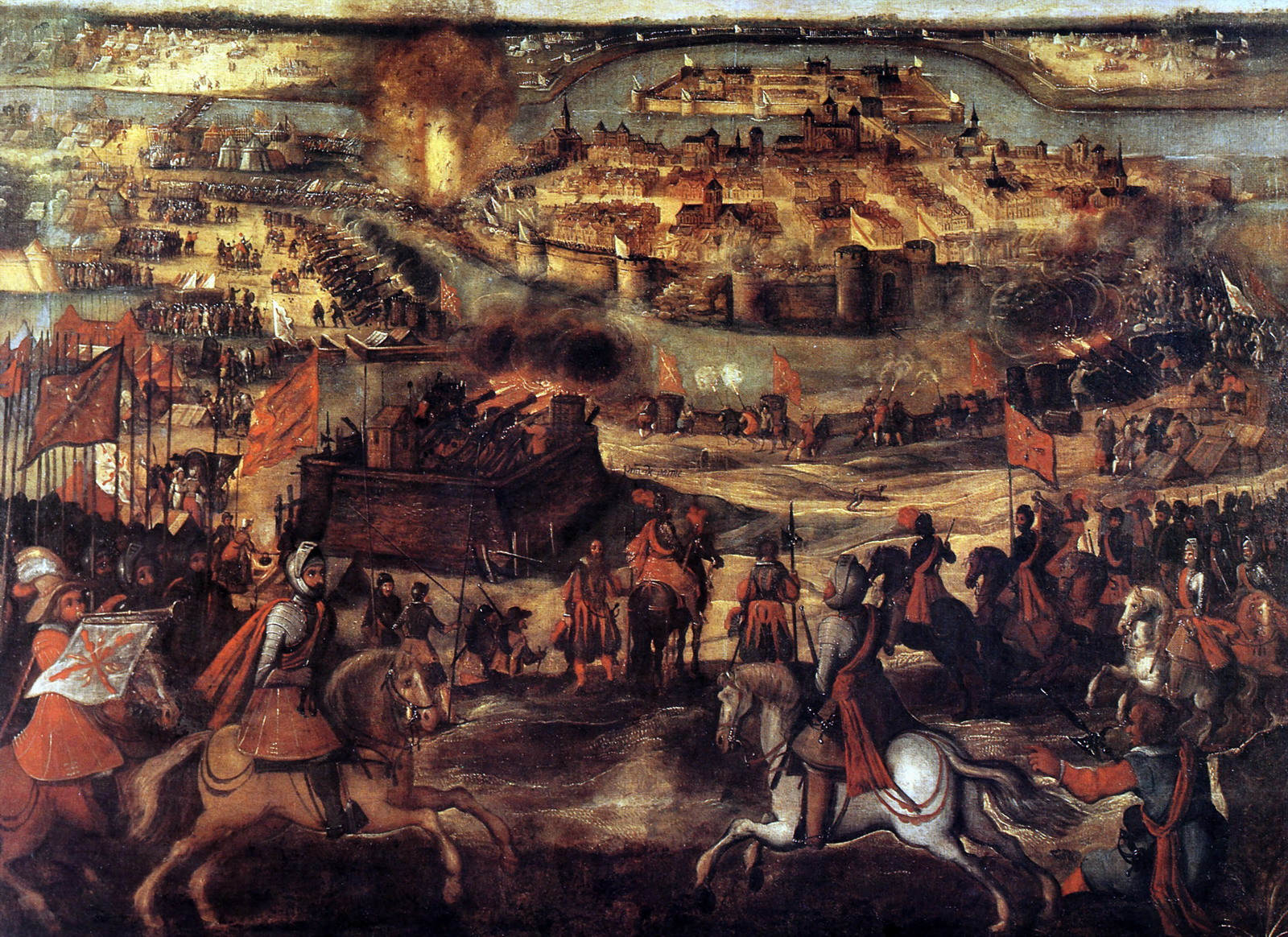
The Siege of Maastricht in 1579, as depicted in the Palace of Aranjuez

On 6 January 1579, the counties of Hainaut and Artois and the city of Douai signed their own defensive Union of Arras, which sought reconciliation with the Spanish government on its own terms. It reconfirmed the Pacification and the Perpetual Edict, in addition to neutrality with Spain. In return, Spain was to refrain basing its foreign troops in the provinces. Once Parma accepted these conditions, the grievances of the conservative Catholics against Spain were satisfied, and they were ready for a separate peace in the form of the Treaty of Arras on 17 May 1579, in which they renewed their allegiance to Philip. Although Hainaut, Artois and Douai were all French-speaking, prompting many a later Dutch historian to attribute their departure from the general union on linguistic differences, and thus a "Walloon affair", Henri Pirenne stated that language played no role in their decision to pursue a separate peace. These places were very rural, conservative and dominated by Catholic nobility compared to the provinces of Flanders, Brabant, Holland and Zeeland, which were far more urbanised and dominated by many autonomous cities where burghers had political power. By contrast, Hainaut had only one city (Mons), Artois only three (Arras, Béthune and Saint-Omer). When the nobility-dominated States of Artois, increasingly concerned about Calvinist violence in Flanders and Brabant, proposed peace to Don Juan on 1 March 1578, followed by the States of Hainaut on 6 March 1578, burghers in Béthune, Aire, Saint-Omer and Douai immediately protested, with a minority of fanatical Calvinists even briefly seizing power in Arras (just like the Ghent Calvinists had) and raising the Prince's Flag to show their political allegiance. This Francophone Calvinist rebellion failed because the far more powerful Artesian nobility was able to defeat it. On the other hand, burghers dominated in the neighbouring French-speaking urbanised Tournaisis, which did not join the Union of Arras, and remained loyal to the Revolt until the Siege of Tournai (1581), when Parma forced them to surrender.

=== 1579: Union of Utrecht ===
Meanwhile, William of Orange and the States-General in Antwerp were less than enthusiastic about the Union of Utrecht. They would far prefer a broader based union, still based on the Pacification and the "religious peace", which both the unions of Utrecht and Arras implicitly rejected. However, rapid developments in divergent directions in both north and south made the attempts at maintaining unity moot. In the north the adherents of the Union of Utrecht managed to consolidate their position in the provinces of Friesland and Gelderland by May, though not without a struggle with the conservatives. However, Overijssel remained divided and in Groningen the city and the stadtholder for the States-General, Count Rennenberg, kept their distance. By the time of the Treaty of Arras, it was clear that the split had hardened, and William therefore finally conceded defeat and signed the Union of Utrecht on 3 May 1579, while encouraging the Flemish and Brabantian cities in Protestant hands to also join the Union.

By the end of 1579, the belligerents were at a stalemate, as neither Parma nor Orange had sufficient troops and materiel to field an army capable of conducting a major offensive. Having withdrawn his Spanish and Italian troops as required by the Union of Arras, Parma had replaced his foreign personnel with German or 'native' (Low Countries) soldiers for a total of 93 infantry companies, 57 of which were necessary for garrisoning strategic points. The remaining 36 companies (c. 5,400–7,200 men) were available for attack. The combined forces of the rebel States-General were twice as large on paper, with Orange's war budget of December 1579 listing 96 defensive companies on garrison duty plus 101 companies available for field action. But in practice he could field far fewer, as the provinces were customarily hesitant to agree to deploy their troops beyond their own borders. In part, this was because irregular payment for out-of-province soldiers was a known systemic problem, which could cause mutiny when unpaid soldiers could not feed themselves and resorted to force against civilians, desertion, or defection to the enemy. Examples include 'trouble' caused by Edward Norreys's four English companies stationed in the frontier city of Tournai, because the States of Flanders had failed to pay their wages, and the key border outpost of Bouchain fell to Parma's troops in September 1580 in part because the Union of Utrecht had 'too much to do' within its own borders to send any money.

=== 1580 ===
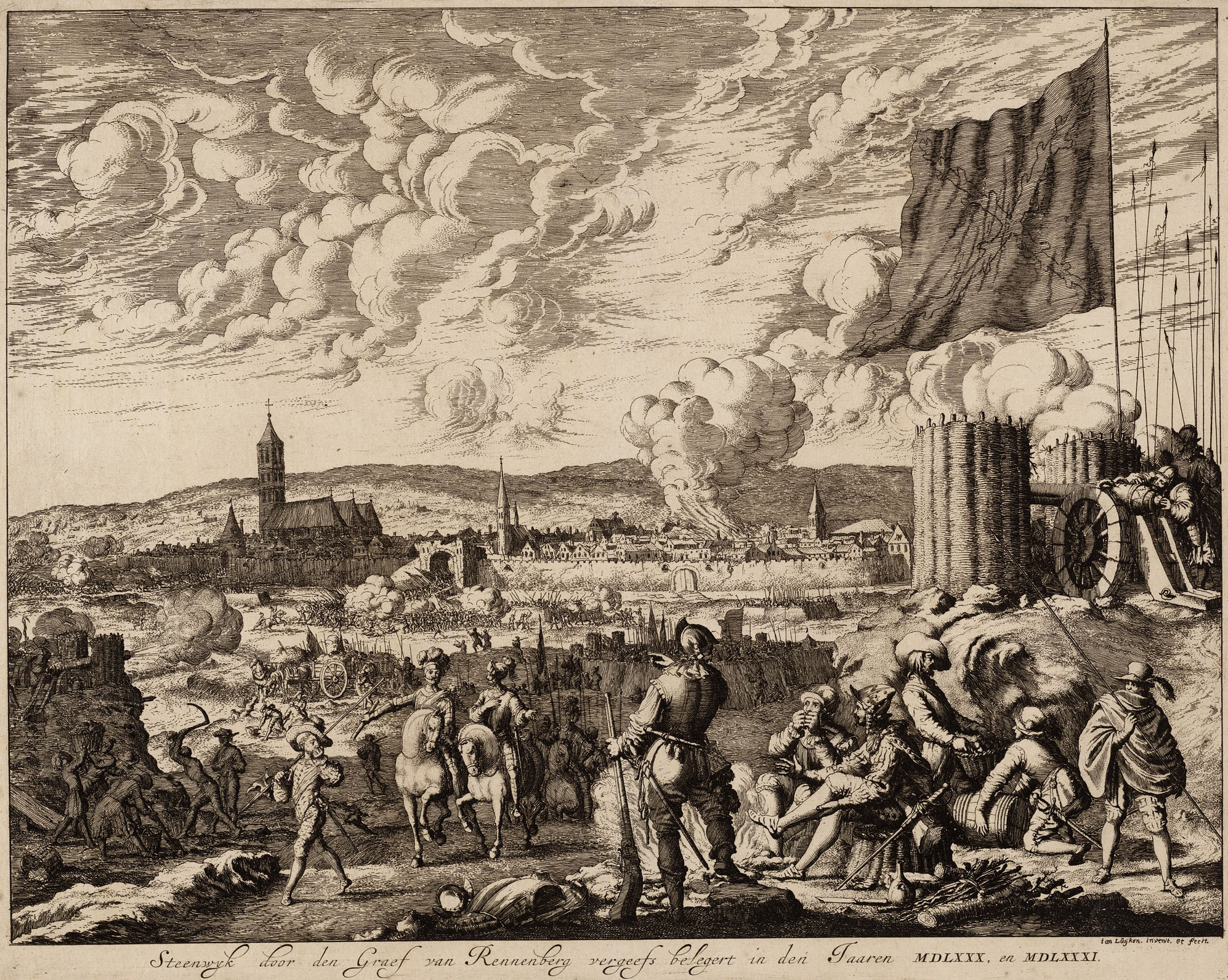
Siege of Steenwijk in 1580–81 by Count Rennenberg

At this time, on the initiative of Emperor Rudolph II a final attempt was made to attain a general peace between Philip and the States-General in the German city of Cologne. As both sides insisted on mutually exclusive demands, these peace talks only served to make the irreconcilability of both parties obvious; there appeared to be no more room for the people who favoured the middle ground, like Count Rennenberg. Rennenberg, a Catholic, now made up his mind to go over to Spain. In March 1580, he called for the provinces in his remit to rise against the "tyranny" of Holland and the Protestants. However, this only served to unleash an anti-Catholic backlash in Friesland and Overijssel. The States of Overijssel were finally convinced to adhere to the Union of Utrecht. Nevertheless, Rennenberg's "treason" posed a severe strategic threat to the Union, especially after Parma sent him reinforcements in June. He managed to capture most of Groningen, Drenthe and Overijssel in the next few months. Meanwhile, William of Orange had been declared an outlaw by Philip II in March 1580.

The territory under nominal States-General control was steadily shrinking in other parts as well, as Parma made steady progress. After taking Maastricht in June 1579, he seized Kortrijk in February 1580, after a four-month siege. The States-General replied by recapturing Mechelen in April after which the victorious English mercenaries sacked the town in what has become known as the English Fury. William of Orange by now was convinced that the only way to avert total defeat was to regain support of the moderates, alienated by Calvinist radicalism; reassure the still-loyal Catholics in the South; and retain the trust of the German Lutheran princes and the king of France. To attain these objectives he now persuaded the States-General to offer sovereignty over the Netherlands to the younger brother of king Henri of France, Francis, Duke of Anjou, who in 1578 had already intervened on behalf of the States-General. Anjou was a Catholic, but also a Politique, who in 1576 had brought about the Edict of Beaulieu, which briefly ensured religious peace in France. As such he was acceptable to moderates in both camps. He also would bring the military and financial support of his brother. Brabant and Flanders (but not Holland and Zeeland) supported this scheme and the States-General concluded the Treaty of Plessis-les-Tours in September 1580 with Anjou. The latter arrived in Antwerp in January 1581, where he took an oath to in effect govern as a "constitutional monarch", and was acclaimed by the States-General as Protector of the Netherlands. (Note: The role of the Archduke Matthias as nominal governor-general had now become superfluous, and he was bought off with a generous annuity in March 1581.)

=== 1581 ===
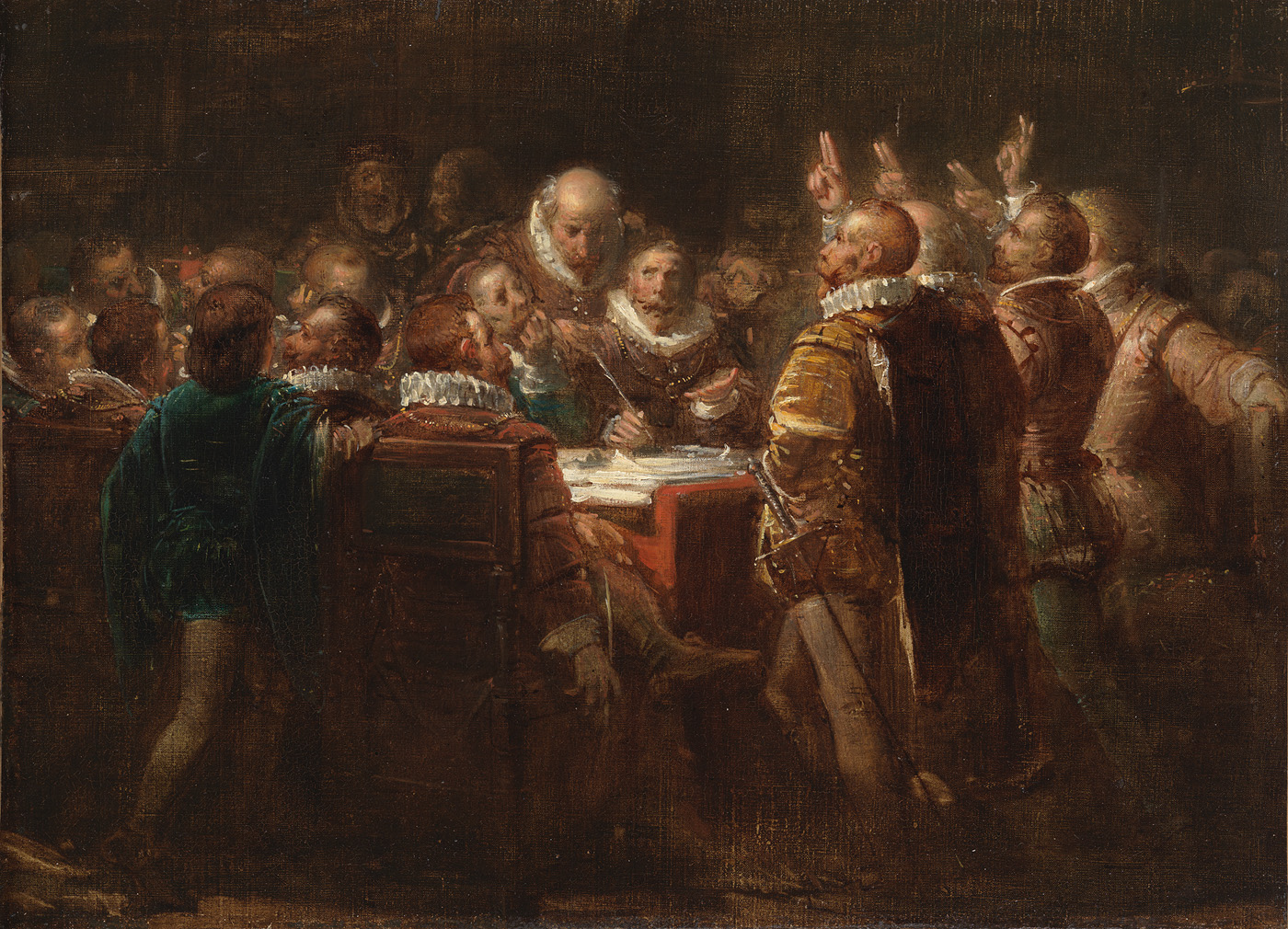
The Act of Abjuration by Johannes Hinderikus Egenberger

Anjou had accepted on the condition that the Netherlands officially renounce any loyalty to Philip. The secession of the States-General and the area under their nominal control from the Spanish Crown was formalised by the Act of Abjuration of 26 July 1581. The main effect of this Act was to force a number of indecisive magistrates in the rebellious provinces to finally declare their true allegiance. Many old-guard regents now resigned and were replaced with people whose loyalty to the anti-Spanish cause was not in doubt. The Act also intensified the propaganda war between both sides, as it took the form of a manifest, setting out the principles of the Revolt, just as William's Apologie in answer to Philip's ban of June 1580, outlawing him, had done. Both documents are redolent of resistance theories that were also disseminated by the Huguenot Monarchomachs. (Note: Though van Gelderen (2002) maintains that the Dutch versions actually antedate the monarchomach publications.) As such they alienated yet another group of moderates.

William's attempt to paper over the disunity within the States-General by bringing in Anjou did not succeed. Holland and Zeeland acknowledged him perfunctorily, but mainly ignored him, and of the other members of the Union of Utrecht, Overijssel, Gelderland and Utrecht never even recognised him. In Flanders his authority never amounted to much either, which meant that only Brabant gave him its full support. Under Anjou's nominal direction the split between the north and south was further emphasised. He governed with a Council of State that, though nominally unitary, was in practice divided in two distinct bodies, each responsible for a different theatre of war. Anjou himself concentrated his French troops in the south, leaving Holland and its allies to fend for themselves against Rennenberg (which suited them fine). He proved signally unable to staunch Parma's inexorable advance, however. Anjou's intervention in August 1581 successfully broke up Parma's Siege of Cambrai, but then he disbanded his army and went off to England to court Queen Elizabeth I (who rejected his marriage proposal); in his absence, Parma besieged and conquered Tournai on 31 November 1581.

=== 1582 ===
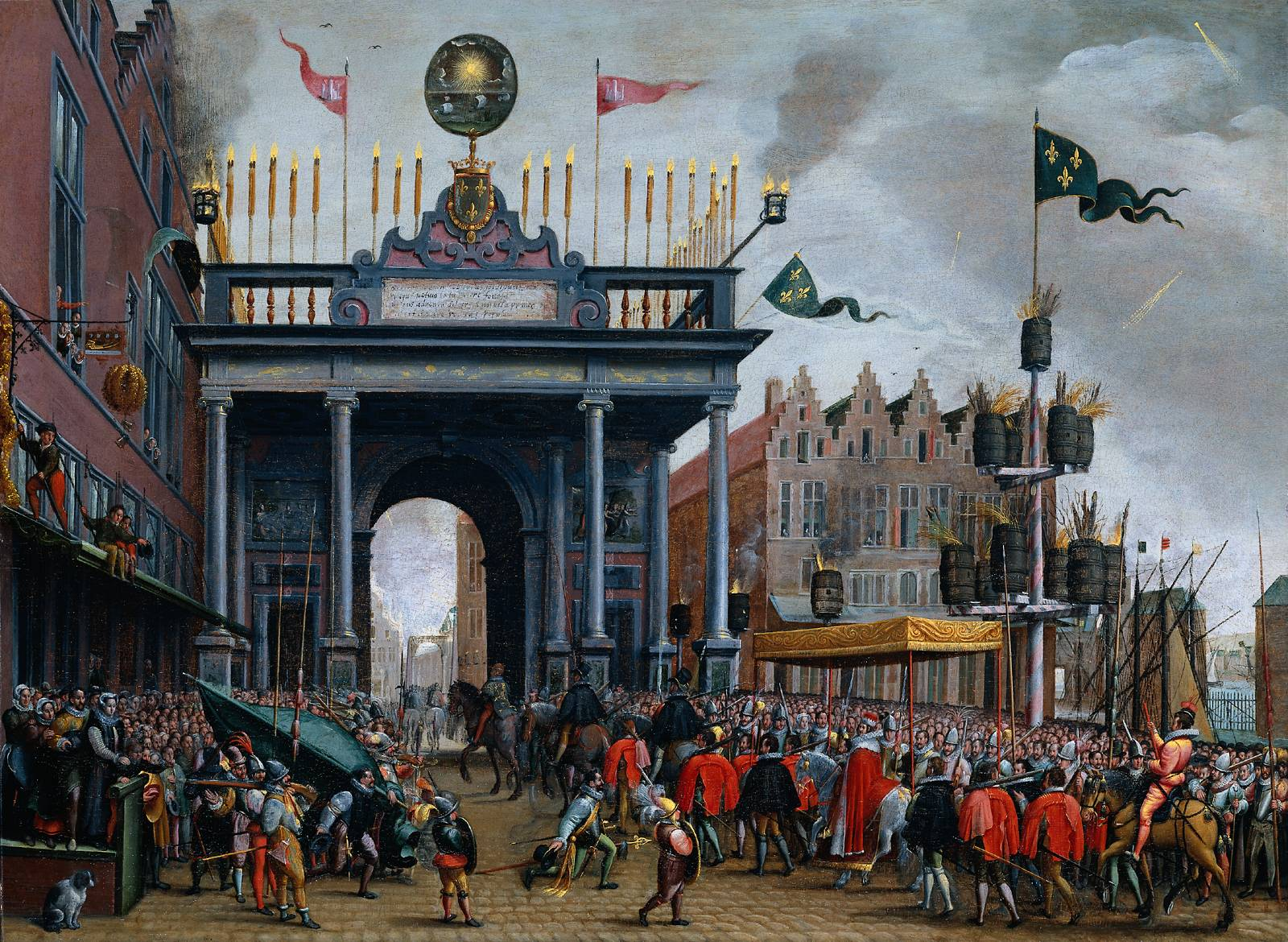
The joyous entry of the Duke of Anjou into Antwerp, February 19, 1582, a year before his attempt to take the city by force.

Parma had long been hampered by the provision in the Treaty of Arras which prohibited stationing of Spanish mercenaries (the troops of the best quality) in the provinces that belonged to the Southern union. However, after his war with the Turks had finally ended, Philip's finances had significantly improved and he had been able to steadily increase the number of troops available to Parma. By October 1582, Parma had an army of 61,000 troops available, mostly of high quality. By that time the Walloon provinces also relented their opposition against taking in Spanish troops. These improvements were soon translated into military successes. In June 1581 Parma had already captured William of Orange's own town of Breda, thereby driving a wedge into the territory of the States-General in Brabant. In 1582 he made further advances into Gelderland and Overijssel. There the war had been going to and fro between the forces of the Union of Utrecht and the royalists. Rennenberg had died in the Summer of 1581, but was ably replaced by Francisco Verdugo, who defeated the English mercenaries of Sir John Norris (of Rijmenam fame) opposing him in Friesland at the Battle of Noordhorn. He was in turn defeated by Norreys in trying to capture the important fort at Niezijl. Verdugo then pushed south – capturing Lochem would topple Zutphen and Deventer. However he was forced to lift his siege of Lochem, but on his way back north captured the fortress city of Steenwijk, the key to the north-east of the Netherlands, which always had eluded Rennenberg.

On 18 March 1582, Juan de Jáuregui attempted to assassinate William. He survived, but suffered severe injuries, which made him unable to campaign for a time.

=== 1583 ===
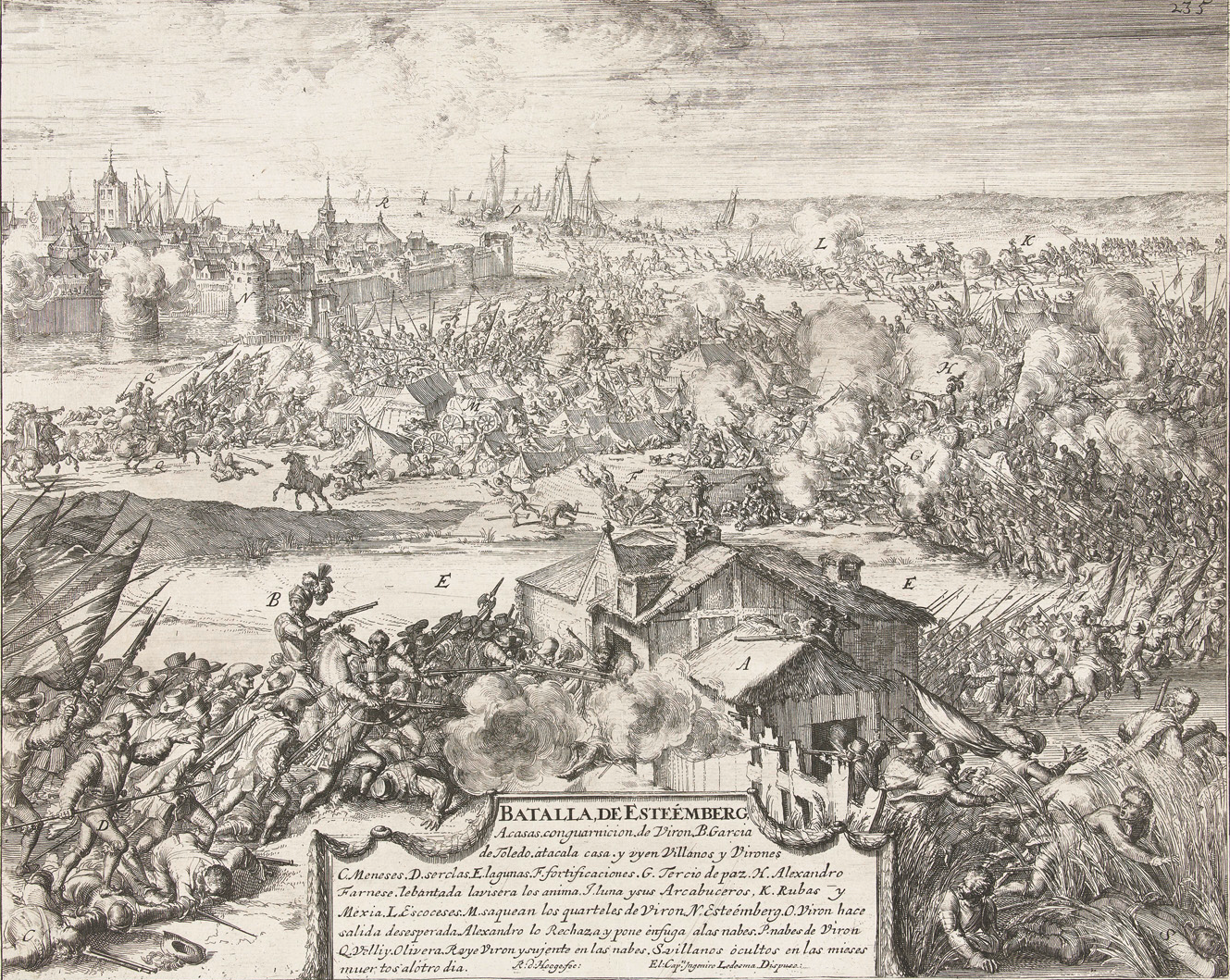
The battle of Steenbergen in 1583

Meanwhile, Anjou had become weary of the restraints placed on his authority by the civilians of the States-General and he attempted to seize power in Flanders and Brabant by way of a military coup. He seized Dunkirk and several other Flemish cities, but in Antwerp the citizens (remembering the 1576 sack) came to arms and massacred the French troops in the streets, an event known as the French Fury of 17 January 1583. The popularity of both Anjou and William of Orange (who was seen as his main promotor) now sank to new lows, especially in Antwerp. Nevertheless, William tried to arrange a reconciliation, but both Anjou and the people of Brabant had had enough, and Anjou left for France in June.

Morale in the cities still held by the States-General in the South sagged. Dunkirk and Nieuwpoort fell without a shot to Parma, leaving only Ostend as a major rebel enclave along the coast. In despair, William now left Brabant for good. He again established his headquarters in the Dutch city of Delft in July 1583, followed by the States-General in August (the latter eventually settled in nearby The Hague). He had returned to his starting point from 1576. His prestige with the States of Holland and Zeeland had appreciably declined since those halcyon days, however. The States had since greatly increased their self-confidence as a budding government.

=== 1584 ===
Meanwhile, Parma's Army of Flanders made inexorable progress. It captured Ypres in April 1584, Bruges in May, and Ghent in September. In this desperate situation, William of Orange started to entertain thoughts of finally accepting the title of Count of Holland, which some of his ardent supporters, notably Paulus Buys, had first pressed upon him in 1581. By June 1583, negotiations were still ongoing as Amsterdam and Gouda opposed the plan. Finally, the States of Holland offered Orange the title of Count under restrictive conditions, to which William voiced his preliminary agreement on 12 December 1583. The proceedings were interrupted when the Duke of Anjou died on 10 June 1584; William and the States-General instead agreed to offer the sovereignty to the king of France instead, and immediately sent a delegation to Paris. However, the French king refused, while William was assassinated by Balthasar Gérard on 10 July 1584, causing the plan to become moot.

The assassination for a while put the States of Holland in disarray, which left the initiative to the much diminished States of Flanders and Brabant in the States-General. The latter were by now getting desperate as they controlled only slivers of their provinces (Parma had put Antwerp under siege on 3 July 1584). They believed that their only succour could come from France. On their behest the States-General therefore started a debate on the merit of once more offering sovereignty to king Henri III of France in September, and over Hooft's and Amsterdam's objections a Dutch embassy was sent to France in February 1585. But the situation in France had deteriorated, the religious strife between Huguenots (Protestants) and Catholics increasing, and so Henri did not feel strong enough to defy Philip, prompting him to decline the honour.

=== 1585 ===
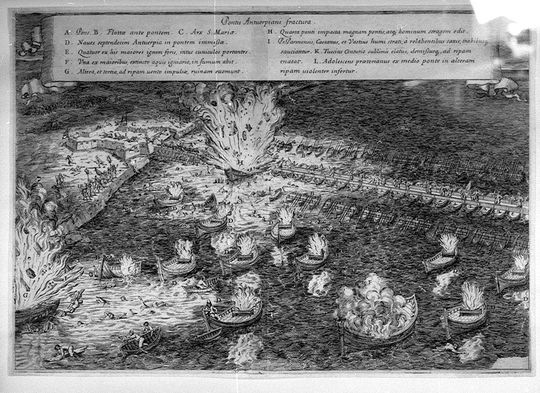
Hellburners against Farnese's pontoon bridge during the siege of Antwerp, 1584–1585. Print from Famiano Strada

Meanwhile, the "Calvinist republic" of Antwerp was being brought to heel by Parma. He had cut its supply-line from the north by placing a pontoon bridge across the Scheldt river downstream from the city. The usual starvation tactic now began to take hold on the city of 80,000. Morale declined, also because one of the last Brabant holdout, Brussels, surrendered in March 1585. After a Dutch amphibious assault (during which an attempt was made to blow up the ship-bridge with the use of "Hellburners") failed in April, the city finally surrendered in August 1585. The Fall of Antwerp – the largest city in the Low Countries at the time – prompted over half its population to flee to the north. Between 1560 and 1590, the population of Antwerp plummeted from 100,000 inhabitants to 42,000. Well aware of the counter-productivity of Alba's terror tactics, Parma treated the inhabitants leniently, but most Protestants nevertheless migrated to the northern provinces, swelling the stream of often wealthy merchants and skilled labourers that sought refuge there in this period. A side effect of this wholesale migration was that the economic strength of the reconquered provinces steadily declined, while that of the United Provinces, especially Holland and Zeeland, mightily increased.

The States-General in their extremity now turned to the English monarch Elizabeth I with an offer of sovereignty. Elizabeth had been approached as early as 1573 by the States of Holland with a similar offer for the province, but then she declined, as she generally disapproved of rebellion. Now, however, the English government reconsidered in view of the gains Parma was making, which also had the unwanted effect of strengthening Catholic anti-government sentiment in England. Though declining to take up the offer of sovereignty, Elizabeth therefore decided to extend an English protectorate over the Netherlands, be it under strict conditions to protect her interests. She offered to send an expeditionary force of 6,350-foot and 1,000 horse, the cost to be shared by the States-General, provided her nominee, Robert Dudley, 1st Earl of Leicester, would be put in both military and political charge of the country as governor-general. Furthermore, he should govern through a reconstituted Council of State, on which the English government would have two voting members (one of which was the Clerk of the Privy Council, Sir Thomas Wilkes), and she was to be given the fortress ports of Flushing and Brill as surety for the loans she extended. The States-General agreed to this in the Treaty of Nonsuch of 20 August. This was the first instance in which the rebel state was diplomatically recognised by a foreign government (the treaty with Anjou having been "private").

Leicester's intervention in the Netherlands had mixed results. He was to be a rallying point for the forces in the Netherlands that were opposed to the hegemony of the States of Holland. As a protector of the Puritans in England, he was seen as a natural ally by the "strict" faction of Calvinists in the Netherlands, who had opposed William of Orange's policy of "religious peace", and now were arrayed against the "lax" Dutch regents who favoured an Erastian Church order, a bone of contention for many years to come. Those Dutch regents, led by the Land's Advocate of Holland, Johan van Oldenbarnevelt, opposed Leicester from the start because they identified him as the focus of the opposition in the Netherlands to the power they had acquired during the course of the Revolt. Beside the hard-line Calvinists, that opposition consisted of the Dutch nobility, whose power had declined in favour of that of the despised merchant class that the regents represented, and the factions in the other provinces, such as Utrecht and Friesland, that resented Holland's supremacy.

=== 1586 ===
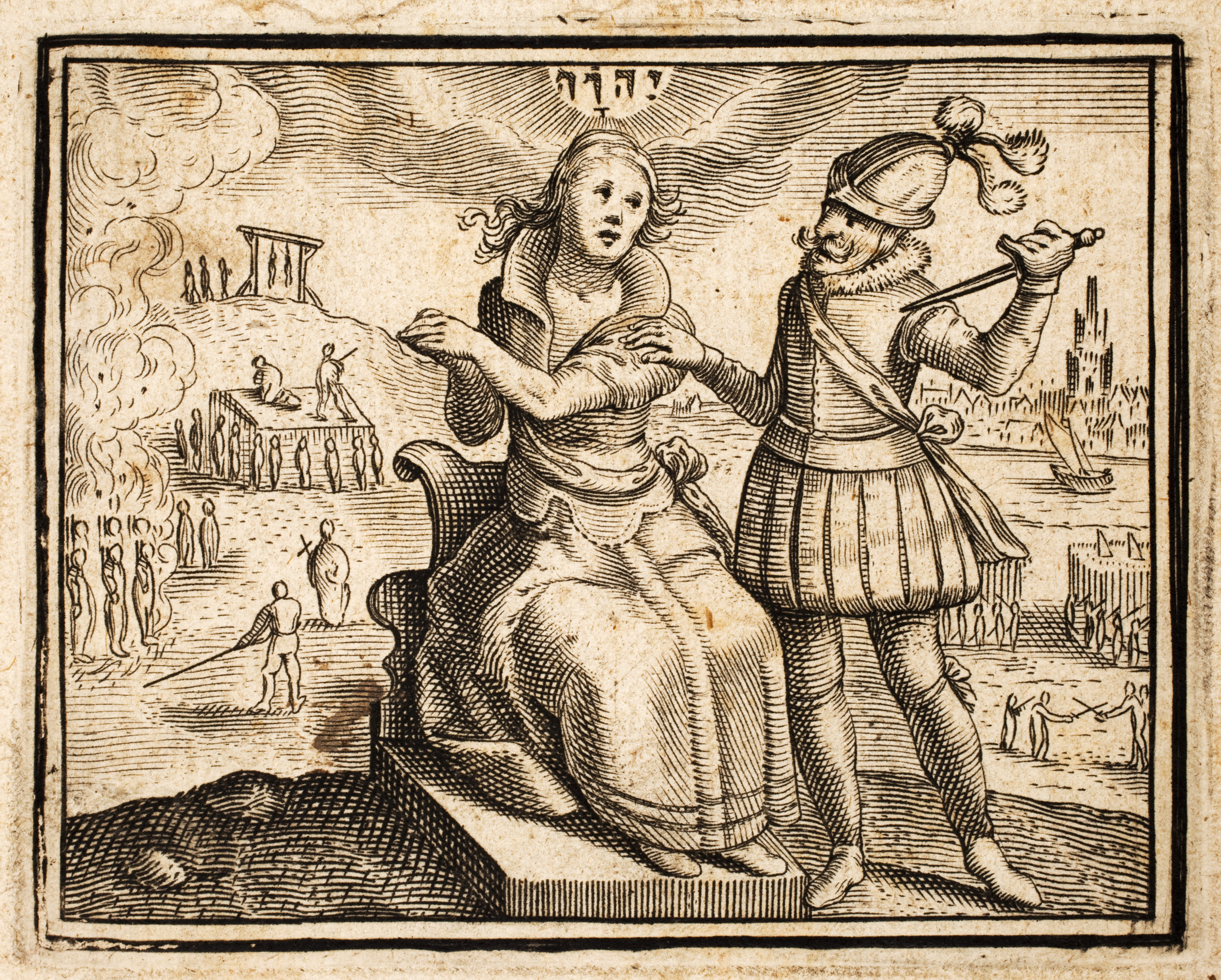
Allegory: a Spanish soldier menaces a Dutch maiden with a dagger against a background of executions and battle, print from Johannes Gysius: Oorspronck ende voortgang der Neder-landtscher beroerten ende ellendicheden, 1616

The first conflict arose during the negotiations with Leicester in January 1586 over the exact contents of his commission as governor-general. The Treaty of Nonsuch provided that stadtholders for the individual provinces would henceforth be appointed by the Council of State, so as to give England a say in the matter. Nevertheless, in Friesland and Groningen William Louis, Count of Nassau-Dillenburg (nephew of William of Orange), and in Utrecht, Gelderland and Overijssel Adolf van Nieuwenaar had been appointed by the States-General in early 1585, before the treaty. In a show of bad faith the States of Holland and Zeeland had then appointed the second legitimate son of William of Orange, Maurice of Nassau, (Note: Orange's eldest son, Philip William, the Prince of Orange until his death in 1618, was a prisoner of war in Spain; William of Orange's second son Justinus van Nassau, by his mistress Eva Elincx, was illegitimate.) stadtholder in their provinces just before Leicester arrived. To add insult to injury, the States insisted that all stadtholders derived their authority from the sovereign States of the provinces that appointed them, so Leicester could claim no say in the matter (an argument that would play an important role in future constitutional conflicts). Confronted with this fait accompli he had no choice but to acquiesce.

Leicester also clashed with Holland over matters of policy like the representation of the States of Brabant and Flanders, who by now no longer controlled any significant areas in their provinces, in the States-General. From 1586 on they were barred from taking part in the deliberations over Leicester's objection, though he managed to retain their seats in the Council of State for them. Once the States-General were thus deprived of the membership of the last Southern provinces, Israel (1995) stated that one may in effect start using the name Dutch Republic for the new state. Holland also opposed Leicester's embargo on "trade with the enemy." Superficially, this made sense from a strategic point of view, and the embargo proved quite effective after Leicester put it in force in April, causing much hardship in the Spanish-controlled territories in the next Winter. However, the embargo also hit the Dutch merchants very hard, as much of the grain trade on the Baltic was now diverted to England. The Dutch regents therefore preferred a system of control with licenses that had the added benefit of bringing in much-needed revenue. For the moment Leicester prevailed on this point, however.

The political strains between Leicester and Holland intensified when Calvinist hard-liners, in Utrecht, led by Gerard Prouninck, seized power in that province in August. This provided Leicester with an anti-Holland power base from which he could make difficulties for the Dutch regents in other provinces, especially Friesland, also. When Leicester temporarily returned to England in December, Holland immediately set to work to recover the lost ground. New regulations were put in force that required every officer in the pay of Holland to accept his commission from the stadtholder, Maurice, who also had to approve all troop movements. Leicester's trade embargo was emasculated.

=== 1587 ===
Meanwhile, much mutual irritation had arisen between the Dutch populace and the English troops garrisoned in many towns. In January 1587 the English garrisons at Deventer and Zutphen were bribed to defect to Spain, followed by those in Zwolle, Arnhem and Ostend. This contributed to anti-English sentiment amongst the populace, which helped undermine the pro-English Utrecht faction, that had been agitating for offering sovereignty to Elizabeth once again. When Leicester returned to the Netherlands, he found his friends weakened so much that he concluded that he would have to seize power by force to get the situation under control. After preparations during the Summer, Leicester occupied Gouda, Schoonhoven and a few other cities in September 1587. An attempt to arrest Maurice and Oldenbarnevelt in The Hague failed, however, as did an attempted insurrection of hardline Calvinists in Leiden. When a personal attempt by Leicester to get Amsterdam in his camp also failed, he gave up and returned to England in December 1587. Thus ended the last attempt to keep the Netherlands a "mixed monarchy", under foreign government. The northern provinces now entered a period of more than two centuries of republican government.

== Map gallery ==
1579–1588 overview (Spanish)

1579–1588 overview (Dutch)

1577–1578 (before)

1579

1580

1581

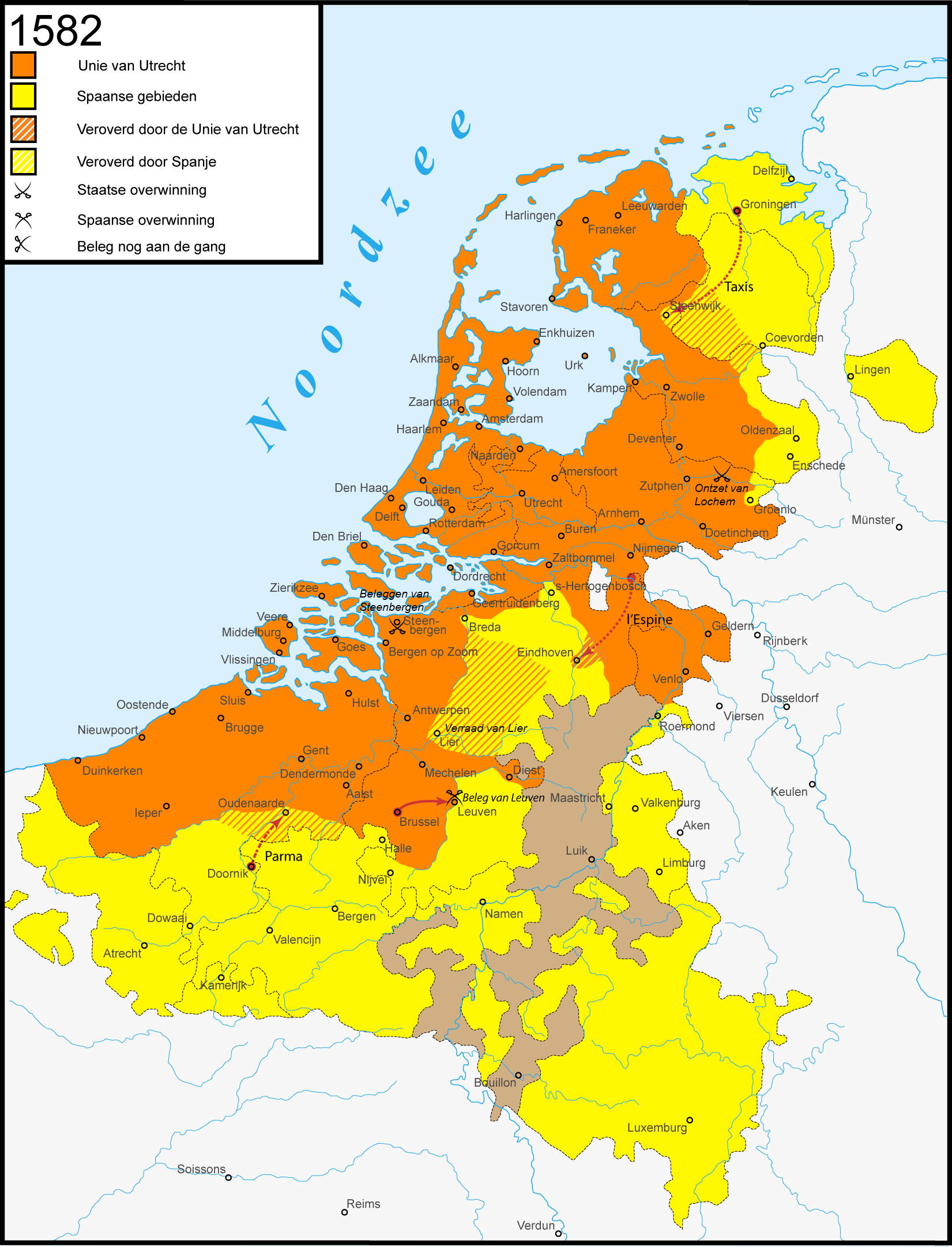
1582

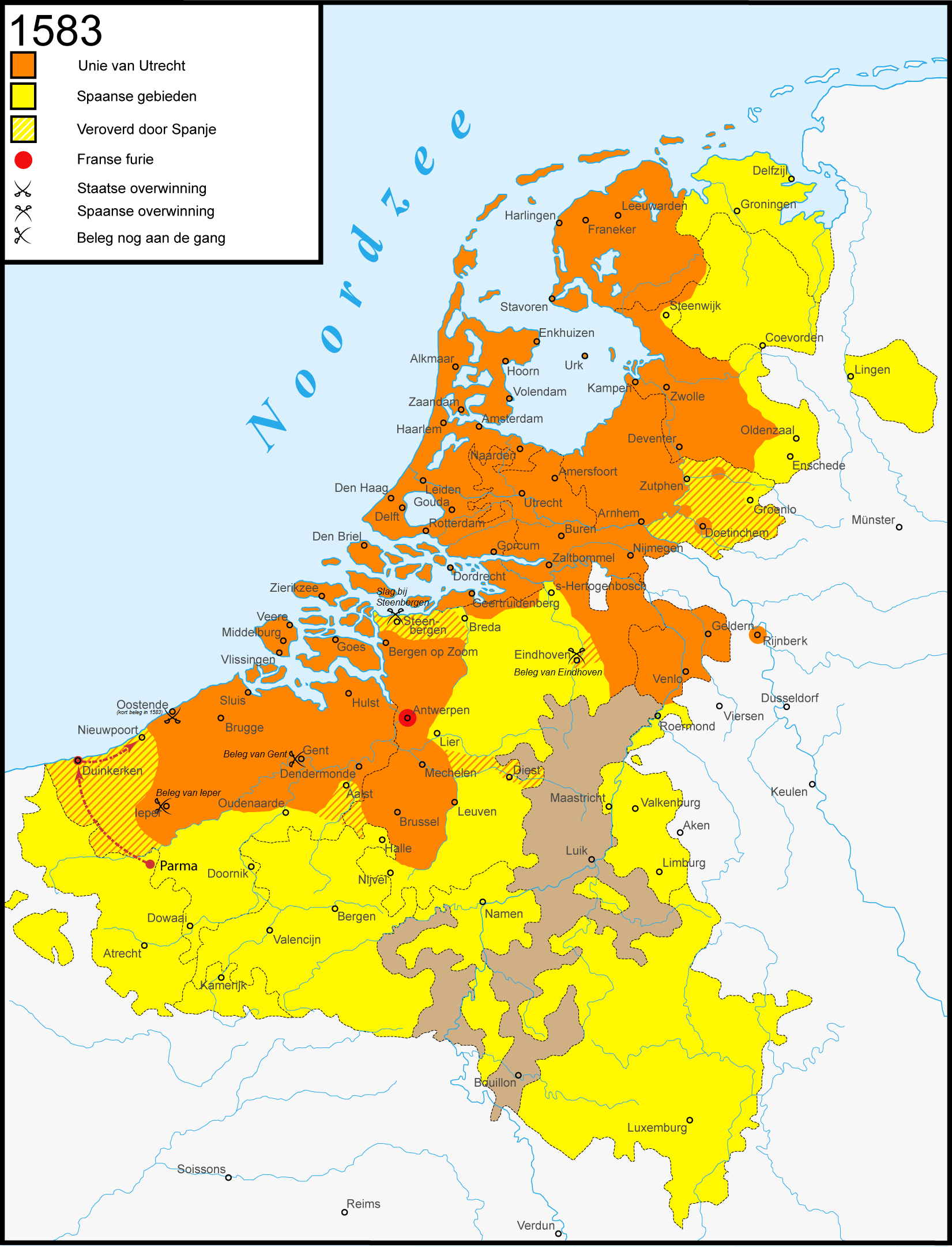
1583

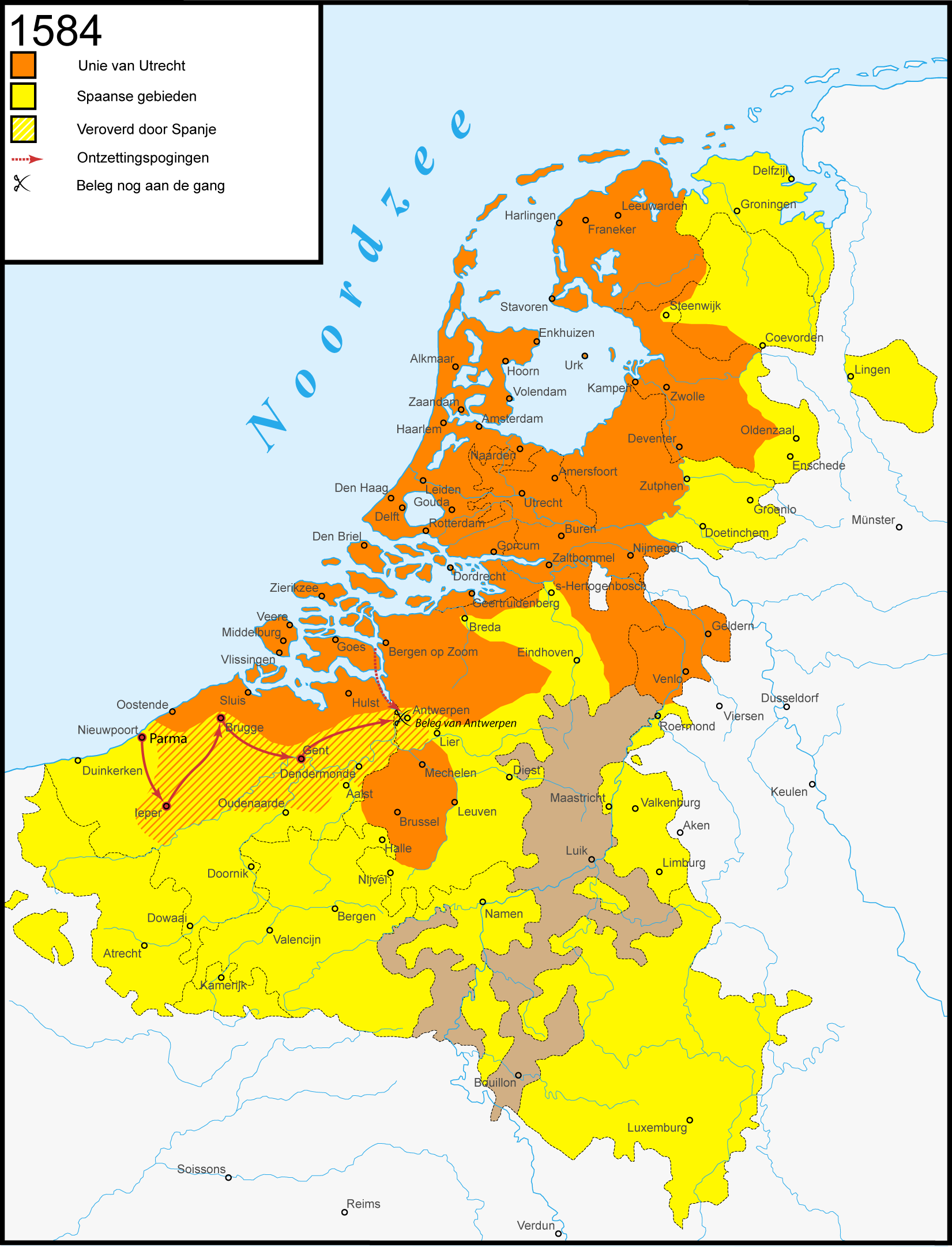
1584

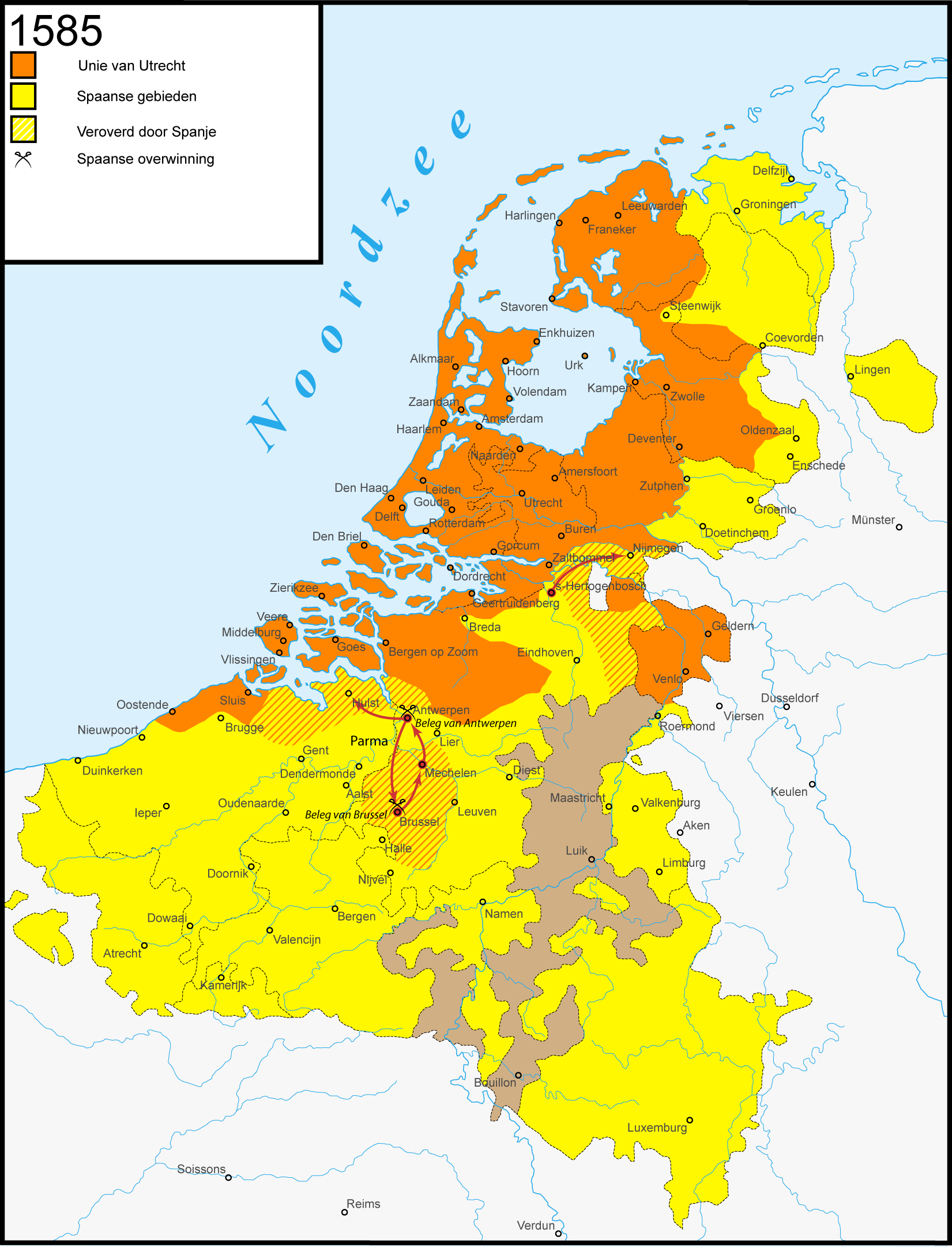
1585

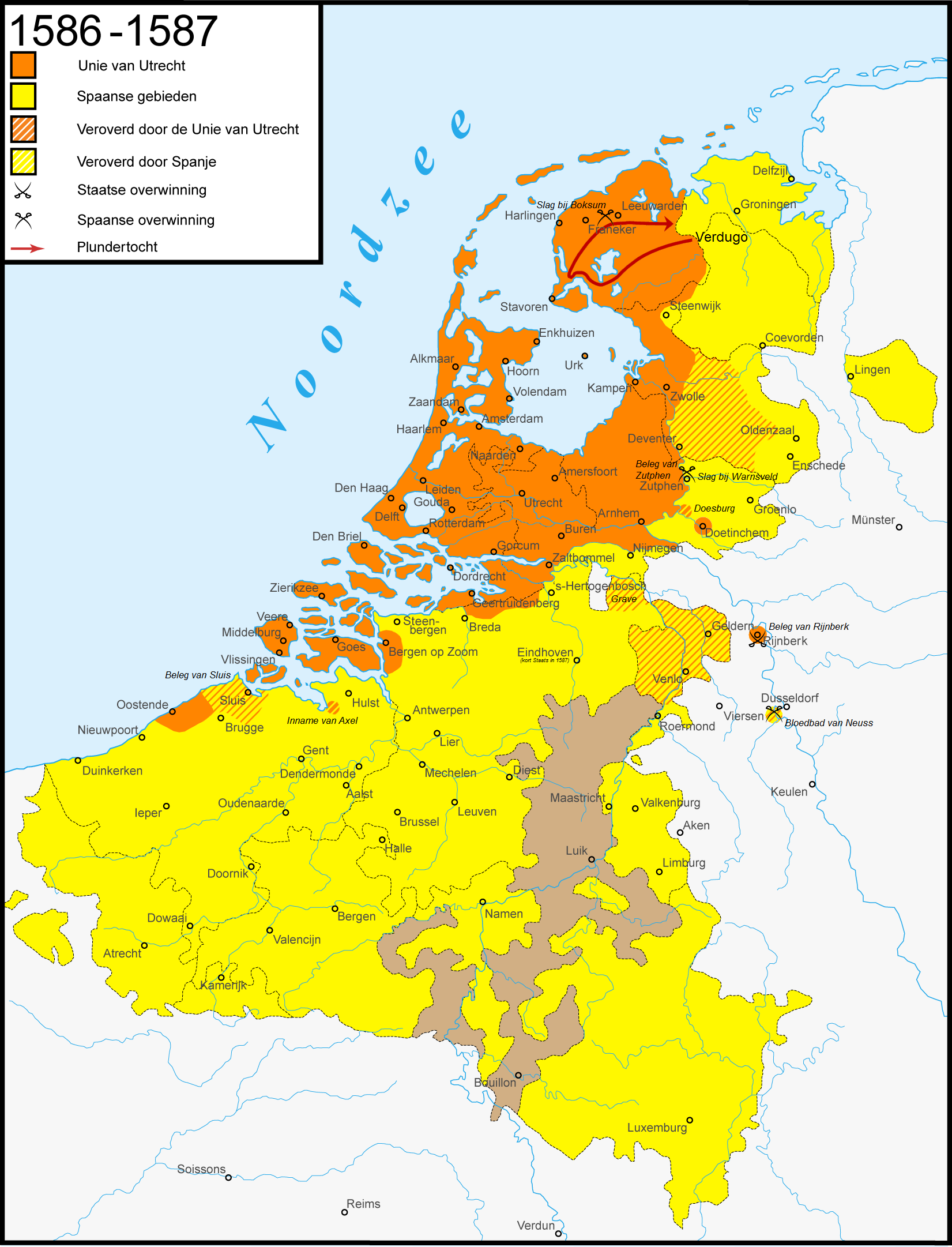
1586–1587

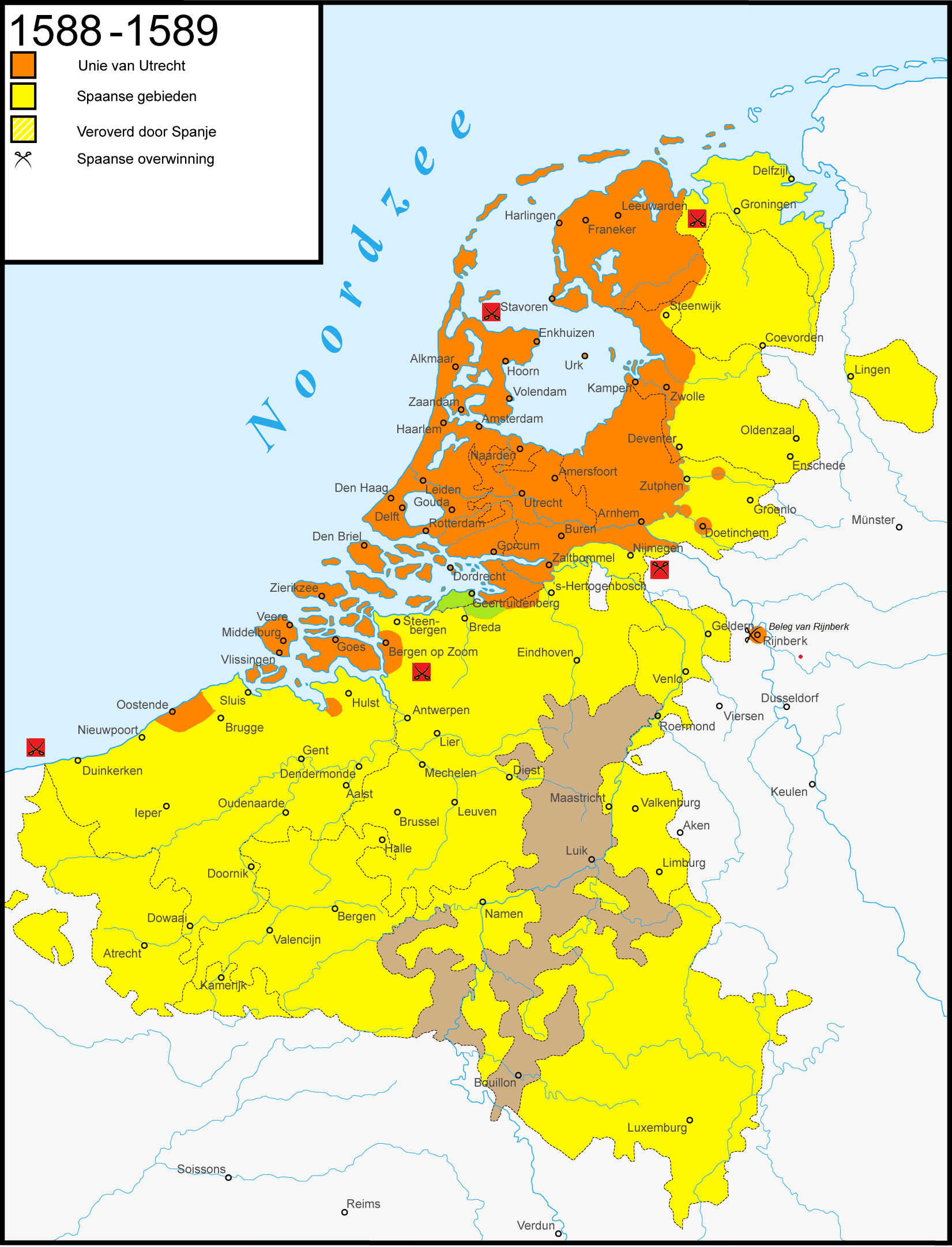
1588–1589 (after)

== Bibliography ==
- Fruin, Robert Jacobus (1899). Tien jaren uit den Tachtigjarigen Oorlog. 1588–1598. The Hague: Martinus Nijhoff. p. 386. (5th edition; original published in 1857)
- van Gelderen, M. (2002). The Political Thought of the Dutch Revolt 1555–1590. Cambridge University Press. ISBN 0-521-89163-9.
- Groenveld, Simon (2009). Unie – Bestand – Vrede. Drie fundamentele wetten van de Republiek der Verenigde Nederlanden. Hilversum: Uitgeverij Verloren. p. 200. ISBN 978-9087041274. (in cooperation with H.L.Ph. Leeuwenberg and H.B. van der Weel)
- Israel, Jonathan (1995). The Dutch Republic: Its Rise, Greatness, and Fall 1477–1806. Oxford: Clarendon Press. ISBN 0-19-873072-1.
- Koenigsberger, Helmut G. (2007). Monarchies, States Generals and Parliaments. The Netherlands in the fifteenth and sixteenth centurie. Cambridge University Press. ISBN 978-0-521-04437-0. [2001] paperback
- Marek y Villarino de Brugge, André (2020b). Alessandro Farnese: Prince of Parma: Governor-General of the Netherlands (1545–1592): v. II. Los Angeles: MJV Enterprises, ltd., inc. ISBN 979-8687563130.
- Marek y Villarino de Brugge, André (2020c). Alessandro Farnese: Prince of Parma: Governor-General of the Netherlands (1545–1592): v. III. Los Angeles: MJV Enterprises, ltd. ISBN 979-8687563130.
- Marek y Villarino de Brugge, André (2020d). Alessandro Farnese: Prince of Parma: Governor-General of the Netherlands (1545–1592): The Siege of Antwerp, v. IV. Los Angeles: MJV Enterprises, ltd., inc. ISBN 979-8689543123.
- Marek y Villarino de Brugge, André (2020e). Alessandro Farnese: Prince of Parma: Governor-General of the Netherlands (1545–1592): v. V. Los Angeles: MJV Enterprises, ltd., inc. ISBN 979-8689560397.
- van der Lem, Anton (1995). "Het verhaal van de Opstand. Hoofdstuk 5: De scheiding in de Nederlanden". De Opstand in de Nederlanden (1555–1648) (in Dutch). Uitgeverij Kosmos / Leiden University. Archived from the original on 18 September 2011.
- van der Lem, Anton (2019). Revolt in the Netherlands: The Eighty Years War, 1568–1648. London: Reaktion Books. pp. 142–243. ISBN 978-1789140880.
- Limm, Peter (1989). The Dutch Revolt, 1559–1648. London: Longman. p. 154.
- Gelderblom, Oscar (2000). Zuid-Nederlandse kooplieden en de opkomst van de Amsterdamse stapelmarkt (1578–1630) (in Dutch). Hilversum: Verloren. p. 350. ISBN 978-9065506207.
- Mulder, Liek; Doedens, Anne; Kortlever, Yolande (2008). Geschiedenis van Nederland, van prehistorie tot heden. Baarn: HBuitgevers. p. 288. ISBN 978-9055746262.
- Tracy, J.D. (2008). The Founding of the Dutch Republic: War, Finance, and Politics in Holland 1572–1588. Oxford University Press. ISBN 978-0-19-920911-8.
