= Siege of Eindhoven (1583) =

1583 siege

- Part of the Eighty Years' War
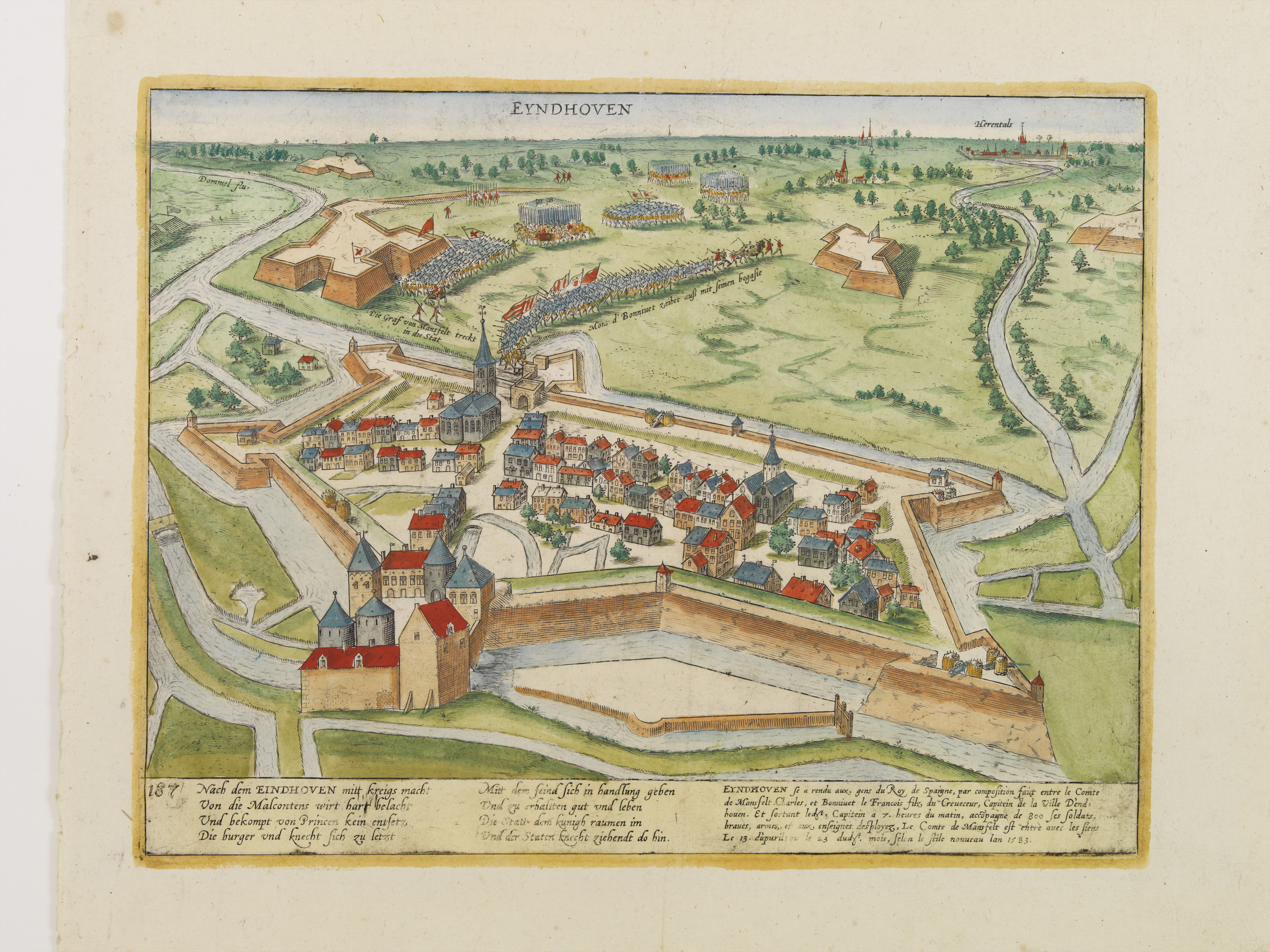
- The Capture of Eindhoven of 1583 by Frans Hogenberg.
Date	7 February – 23 April 1583
Location	Eindhoven, Duchy of Brabant (present-day the Netherlands)
Result	Spanish victory

Belligerents
(Dutch Republic) States-General (Kingdom of France) France: Anjou forces	Spain

Commanders and leaders
(Dutch Republic) Hendrik van Bonnivet (Dutch Republic) Philip of Hohenlohe; Duke of Anjou (Dutch Republic) William of Orange	(Spain) Alexander Farnese (Spain) Karl von Mansfeld (Spain) Claude de Berlaymont

Strength
800 to 1,200 men Reinforced by: 4 cavalry squadrons 5 infantry companies	Unknown

Casualties and losses
Unknown	Unknown

The siege of Eindhoven, also known as the capture of Eindhoven of 1583, took place between 7 February and 23 April 1583 at Eindhoven, Duchy of Brabant, Spanish Netherlands (present-day North Brabant, the Netherlands) during the Eighty Years' War. On 7 February 1583 a Spanish force sent by Don Alexander Farnese (Spanish: Alejandro Farnesio), Governor-General of the Spanish Netherlands, commanded by Karl von Mansfeld and Claude de Berlaymont, laid siege to Eindhoven, an important and strategic city of Brabant held by the States forces under commander Hendrik van Bonnivet. After three months of siege, and the failed attempts by the States-General to assist Bonnivet's forces, the defenders surrendered to the Spaniards on 23 April.

With the capture of Eindhoven, the Spanish forces made great advances in the region, and gained the allegiance of the majority of the towns of northern Brabant. The Spanish victory too, increased the crisis between Francis, Duke of Anjou and the States-General, despite the efforts of Prince William of Orange in preserving the fragile alliance between Anjou and the States-General by the Treaty of Plessis-les-Tours.

== Prelude ==
On 29 September 1580 Francis, Duke of Anjou (younger brother of King Henry III of France), supported by William of Orange, signed the Treaty of Plessis-les-Tours with the States-General of the Netherlands. Based on the terms of the treaty, Anjou assumed the title of Protector of the Liberty of the Netherlands and became sovereign of the United Provinces. On 10 February 1582, after a vain courtship of Queen Elizabeth I in England, Anjou arrived to the Netherlands, when he was officially welcomed by William of Orange in Flushing. In spite of his ceremonious installation as Duke of Brabant and Count of Flanders, Anjou was not popular with the Flemish and Dutch Protestants, who continued to see the Catholic French as enemies; the provinces of Zeeland and Holland refused to recognise him as their sovereign, and William of Orange, the central figure of the Politiques who worked to defuse religious hostilities, was widely criticized for his "French politics".

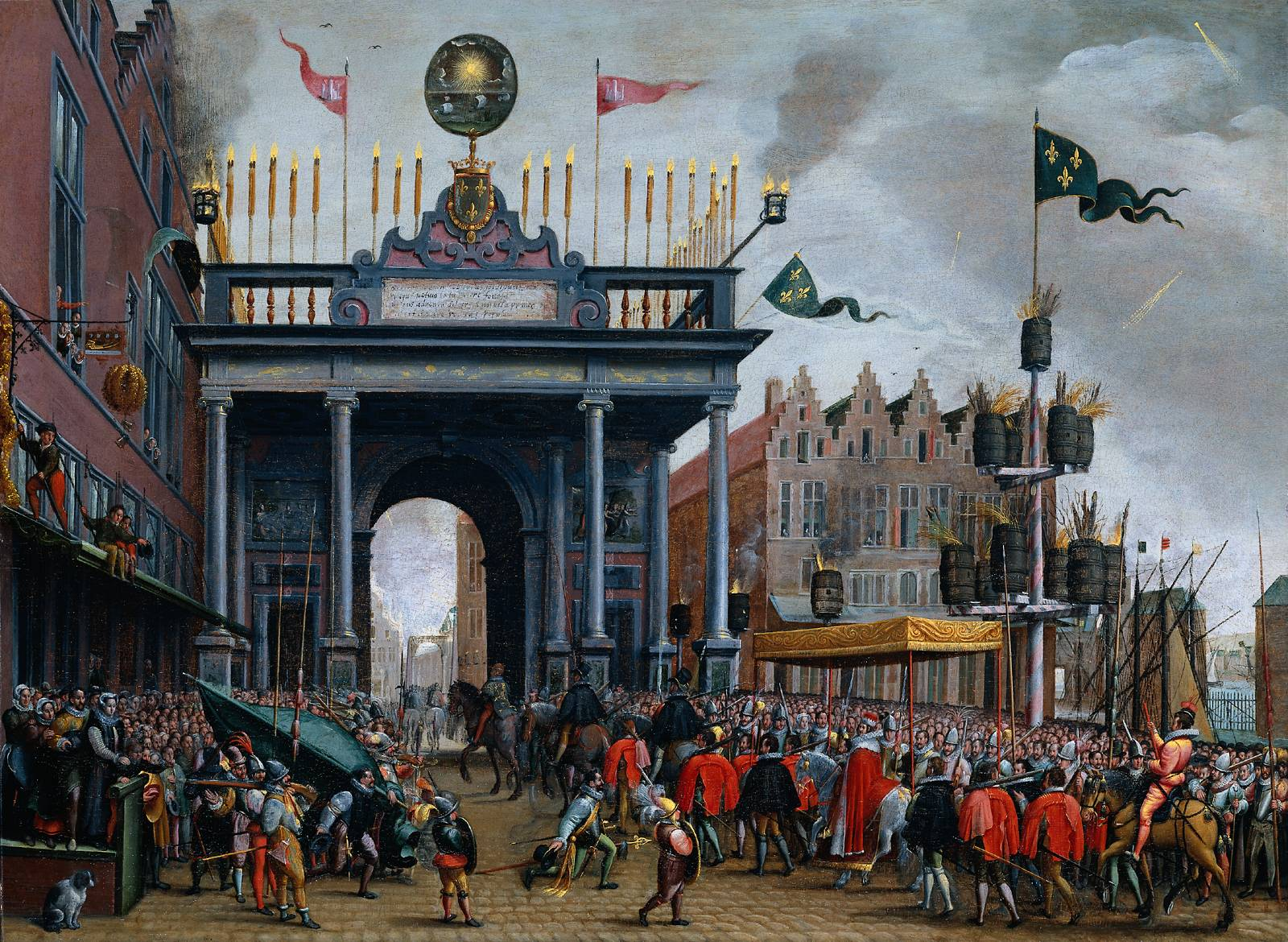
The joyous entry of the Duke of Anjou into Antwerp, 19 February 1582, a year before his attempt to take the city by force. Rijksmuseum Amsterdam.

When Anjou's army of 12,000 infantry and 5,000 cavalry arrived in late 1582, William's plan seemed to pay off, as even Don Alexander Farnese feared that a strong alliance between the Dutch and French could pose a serious threat, but in fact, Anjou had very little influence in the Netherlands, and he himself was not satisfied with the restrictions of the treaty and wanted more power. On 17 January 1583 the French forces led by Francis of Anjou tried to conquer the city of Antwerp by surprise, but unfortunately for Anjou his plan was discovered. The inhabitants, still traumatised by the Spanish plunder seven years earlier, were determined to prevent another occupation by foreign troops by all means possible. Anjou was decisively defeated by the people of Antwerp, losing as many as 2,000 men. However, at the same time, the rest of the French forces gained control of a great number of towns, including Dunkirk and Dendermonde, and despite an explosion of anti-French feeling in rebel towns, the Prince of Orange managed to prevent an open breach with the French.

Meanwhile, the Prince of Parma, Governor-General of the Low Countries in the name of Philip II of Spain, in command of an army of 60,000 soldiers, divided in various fronts, after the Spanish conquests of Maastricht, 's-Hertogenbosch, Courtrai, Breda, Tournai, Oudenaarde, among others, between 1579 and 1582, slowed his successful campaign for the moment, waiting to see what the French would do.

== Siege of Eindhoven ==
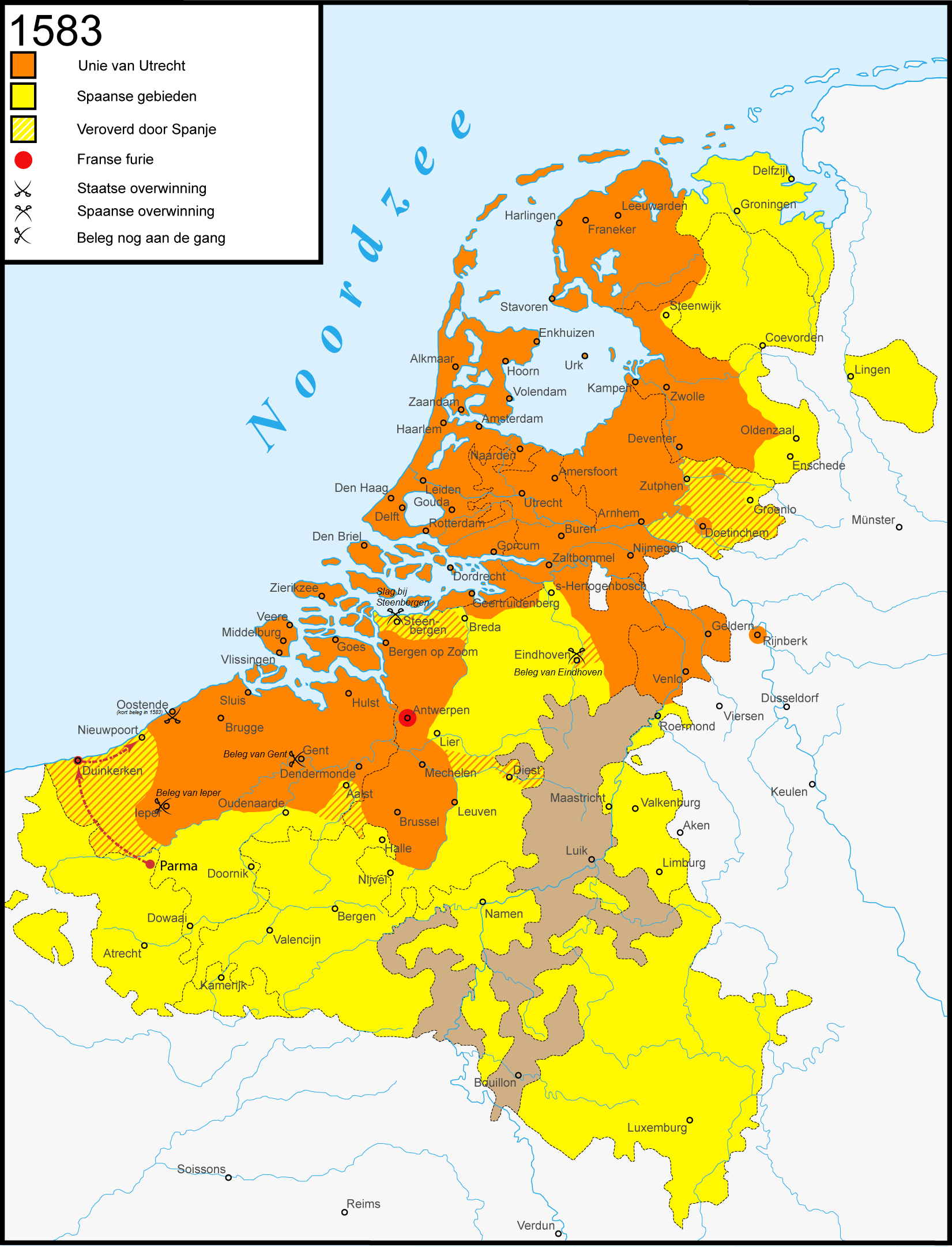
Battles and operations of the Eighty Years' War in 1583.

In late January, Don Alexander, stationed in the loyalist 's-Hertogenbosch, and after the show of the Duke of Anjou at Antwerp, decided to send a substantial force led by the Spanish commanders Karl von Mansfeld and Claude de Berlaymont to begin siege works at nearby Eindhoven, an important and strategic town of northern Brabant held by about 800 to 1,200 Scottish, French, and Dutch soldiers under the States' commander Hendrik van Bonnivet.

On 7 February the Spanish forces reached the gates of Eindhoven and laid siege to the fortress city. The States-General urged the Duke of Anjou to assemble his army and march towards Eindhoven, to relieve the city. Meanwhile, Philip of Hohenlohe-Neuenstein from his base at Geertruidenberg (in 1589 the city was betrayed to Parma by its English garrison), sent 4 squadrons of cavalry and 5 companies of infantry to reinforce Bonnivet's forces. On 18 March Francis of Anjou accepted the terms of the States-General, and the Prince of Orange, ultimately, asked French commander Armand de Gontaut, Baron de Biron, to lead an army composed of Anjou's troops and those levied by the States to relieve Eindhoven. Although Biron was not very keen to accept, the French statesman Pomponne de Bellièvre persuaded him to accept the charge. Thus, Prince William outlined a broad plan for the campaign and put Biron in charge of the joint force, consisting by 2,500 Swiss guards, 2,000 French arquebusiers, 3,500 Dutch, Scottish, French, and English infantry, 1,200 cavalry, and 3 cannons. At the same time, Dutch troops stationed in Gelderland were ordered to advance through Utrecht towards Eindhoven, but were repeatedly turned back to Utrecht's border by the Spanish forces. English and Scottish companies based in northern Flanders also had orders to advance on Eindhoven, but these troops refused to move without their pay.

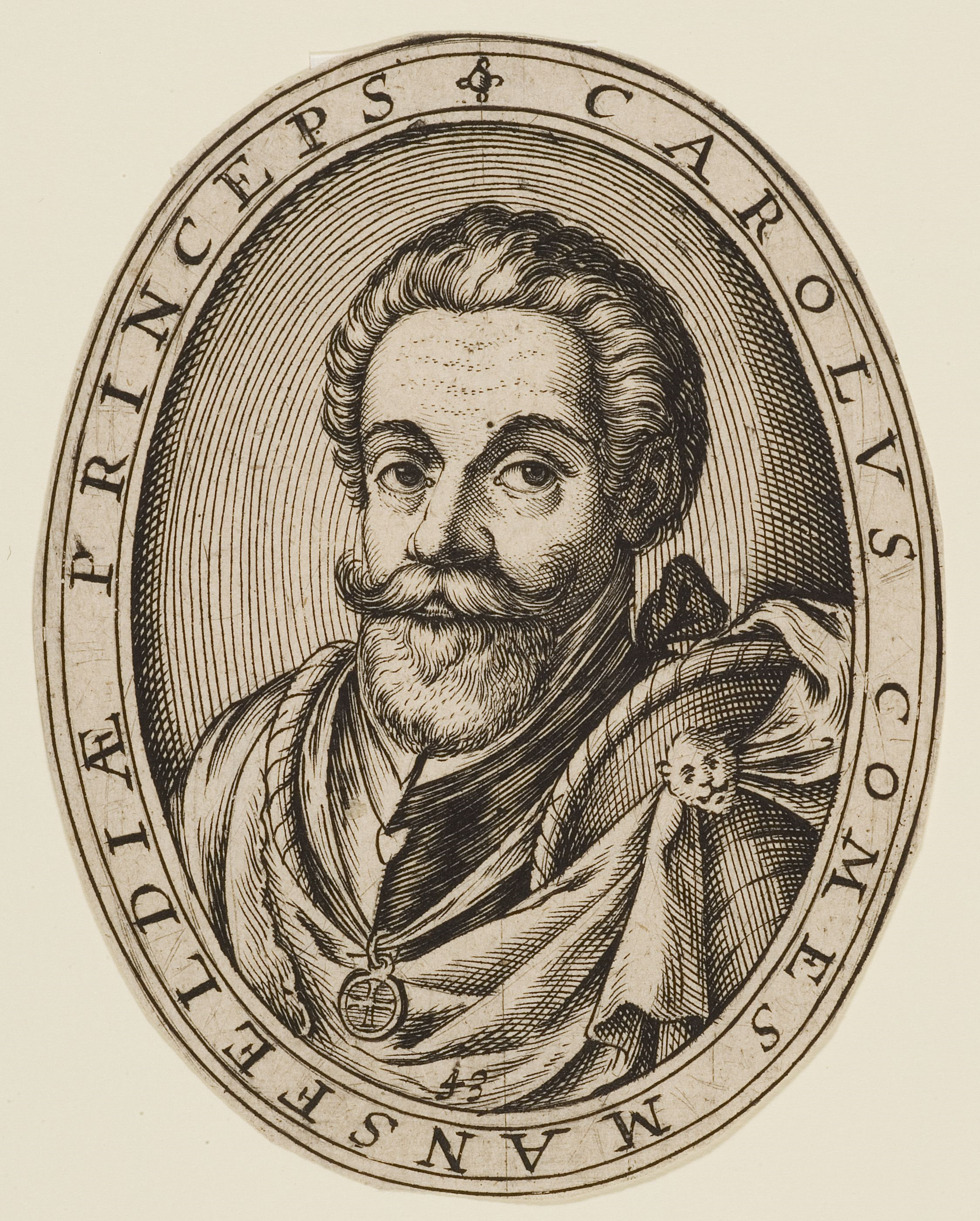
Portrait of Karl von Mansfeld by Abraham Hogenberg.

On 17 April, with all preparations completed by the States-General and the Duke of Anjou's forces, the relief army commanded by Biron marched towards Eindhoven, but Bonnivet's forces, after nearly three months of siege, exhausted and decimated, could not resist more against the intense Spanish siege. Finally, on 23 April, the States' garrison was forced to surrender, and the Spanish army entered victorious into Eindhoven, before Biron's joint forces could even cross the Scheldt.

== Consequences ==
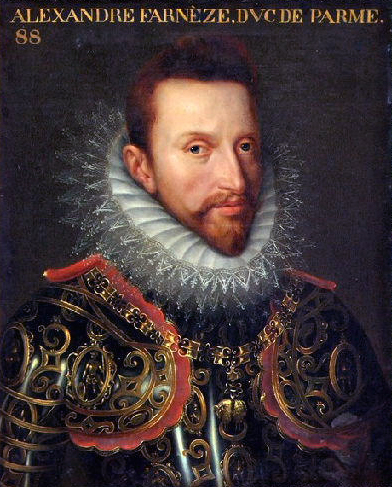
Governor-General Don Alexander Farnese by Otto van Veen.

With the conquest of Eindhoven, Parma's forces made great advances in the region, and gained the allegiance of the majority of the towns of northern Brabant. The Spanish victory also increased the crisis between the Duke of Anjou and the States-General. Anjou laid the blame for the fall of Eindhoven on the States, while the States were fed up with his ambitions, and the inefficiency and slowness of his troops. However, the Prince of Orange, a strong supporter of the alliance, reiterated that they could not hope to defeat Parma without French aid.

Biron moved his army to the north of Roosendaal, between Breda and Bergen op Zoom, where he intended lay siege to Wouw. On 17 June, and after the capture of Diest by the Spaniards on 27 May, his forces were seriously defeated by the Spanish army led by Parma at Steenbergen. The clear superiority of the Spanish Army of Flanders, the lack of pay, and the differences between the French troops (mostly Catholics), and the Dutch and English troops (mostly Protestants), ended with hundreds of desertions among Biron's troops. Meanwhile, the position of Anjou became impossible to hold with the States, and he eventually left the Netherlands in late June. His departure also discredited William of Orange, his main supporter, who nevertheless maintained his support for Anjou.

The pace of the Spanish advance continued, and Dunkirk was the new target of the Prince of Parma. On 16 July the bombardment began, and by late summer the city was captured by the Spanish forces, along with Nieuwpoort, despite the efforts, once more, of the Prince of Orange to relieve the besieged forces.

== See also ==
- French Fury
- French Wars of Religion
- Treaty of Plessis-les-Tours
- List of stadtholders in the Low Countries
- List of governors of the Spanish Netherlands
