= Battle of Steenbergen (1583) =

Battle in The Netherlands in 1583

- Part of the Eighty Years'
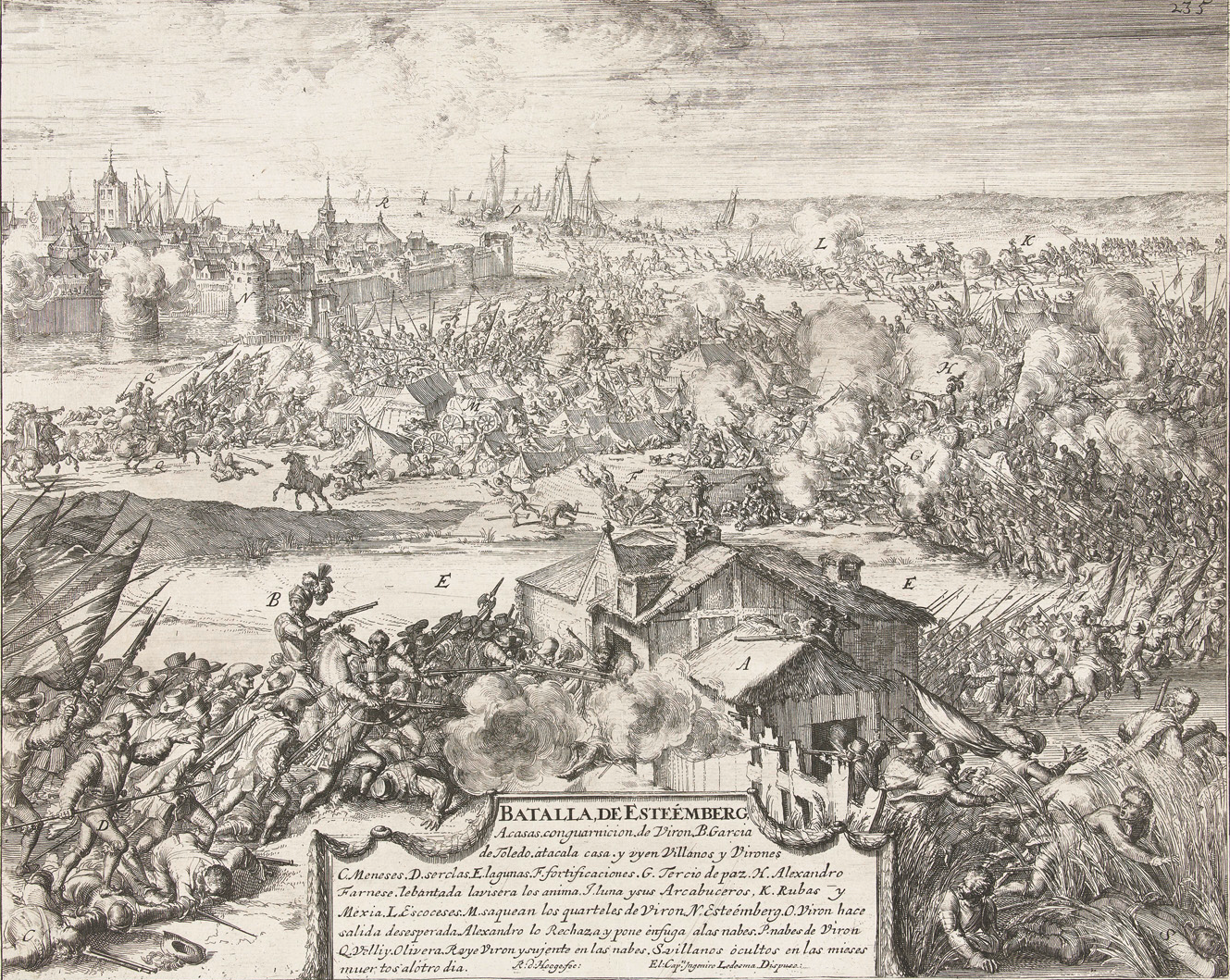
- The Battle of Steenbergen, engraving by Juan de Ledesma and Romeyn de Hooghe (1670–1699). National Library of the Netherlands.
Date	17 June 1583
Location	Steenbergen, Duchy of Brabant (present-day the Netherlands)
Result	Spanish victory

Belligerents
(Dutch Republic) States-General (Kingdom of France) France: Anjou forces	Spain

Commanders and leaders
Baron de Biron (WIA) (Dutch Republic) John Norreys	(Spain) Alexander Farnese

Casualties and losses
At least 3,200 casualties	400 dead or wounded

The Battle of Steenbergen, also known as the Capture of Steenbergen of 1583, took place on 17 June 1583 at Steenbergen, Duchy of Brabant, Spanish Netherlands (present-day North Brabant, the Netherlands). This was an important victory for the Spanish Army of Flanders led by Don Alexander Farnese, Prince of Parma (Spanish: Alejandro Farnesio), Governor-General of the Spanish Netherlands, over the combined army of Dutch and French led by the French Marshal Armand de Gontaut, Baron de Biron, and the English commander Sir John Norreys, during the Eighty Years' War, and in the context of the French Wars of Religion. The victory of the Spaniards ended the Treaty of Plessis-les-Tours, and Francis, Duke of Anjou (French: François de France), left the Netherlands in late June.

== Background ==
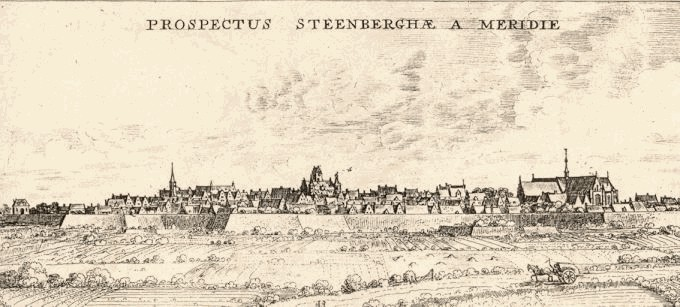
Panoramic view of Steenbergen. Unknown artist.

After the failure of the combined army of Dutch and French led by Marshal Armand de Gontaut, Baron de Biron, put in charge of the army by Prince William of Orange (Dutch: Willem van Oranje), to relieve the city of Eindhoven, the French commander moved his army to the north of Roosendaal, between Breda and Bergen op Zoom, and after several days of siege, captured the castle of Wouw on 10 May. Meanwhile, the Prince of Parma, with the city of Eindhoven insured, continued his advance across North Brabant. Farnese moved with part of his army to Namur, while the rest of the Spanish troops, commanded by General Karl von Mansfeld, captured the towns of Turnhout and Hoogstraten, defeating the small Dutch garrisons, and finally, the city of Diest on 27 May.

From his base at Namur, the Prince of Parma advanced to capture the town of Herentals, but the siege was finally abandoned, and Parma continued to advance to confront the forces of Marshal Biron located near Roosendaal. With the news of the Spanish advance, Biron moved his army to the outsides of Steenbergen, between the same town and Bergen op Zoom, and on 17 June, with the arrival of the forces of Parma the battle began.

== Battle and capture of Steenbergen ==
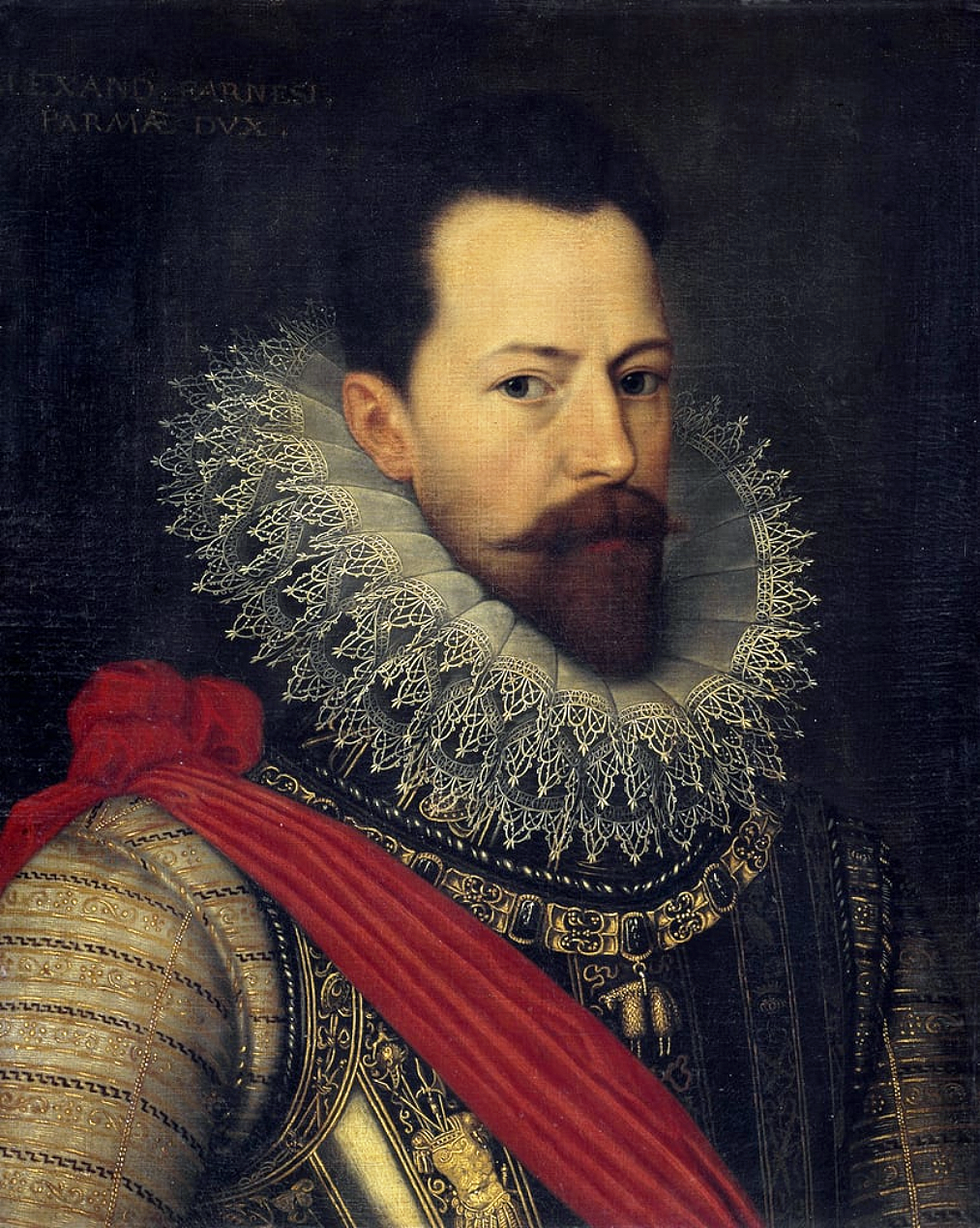
Governor-General Don Alexander Farnese by Otto van Veen.

Despite their numerical superiority, the combined forces led by Biron and Sir John Norreys, who commanded the English infantry along with the Welsh Captain Roger Williams, the just officer who put some order in defending the Spanish attack, were literally swept away by the Spanish cavalry, and then by the infantry, suffering heavy losses, thanks also to the bombardment success of the guns of Don Hernando de Acosta, Lieutenant-General of the artillery of the Army of Flanders, who had a very important role in the battle. The forces of Biron and Norreys suffered at least 3,200 casualties, and almost all the baggage, barrels of gunpowder, 36 flags, and 3 banners captured. On the Spanish side the casualties were 400 dead or wounded. The French Marshal himself, who tried to repel the attack of the Spaniards, fell from his horse and broke his leg.

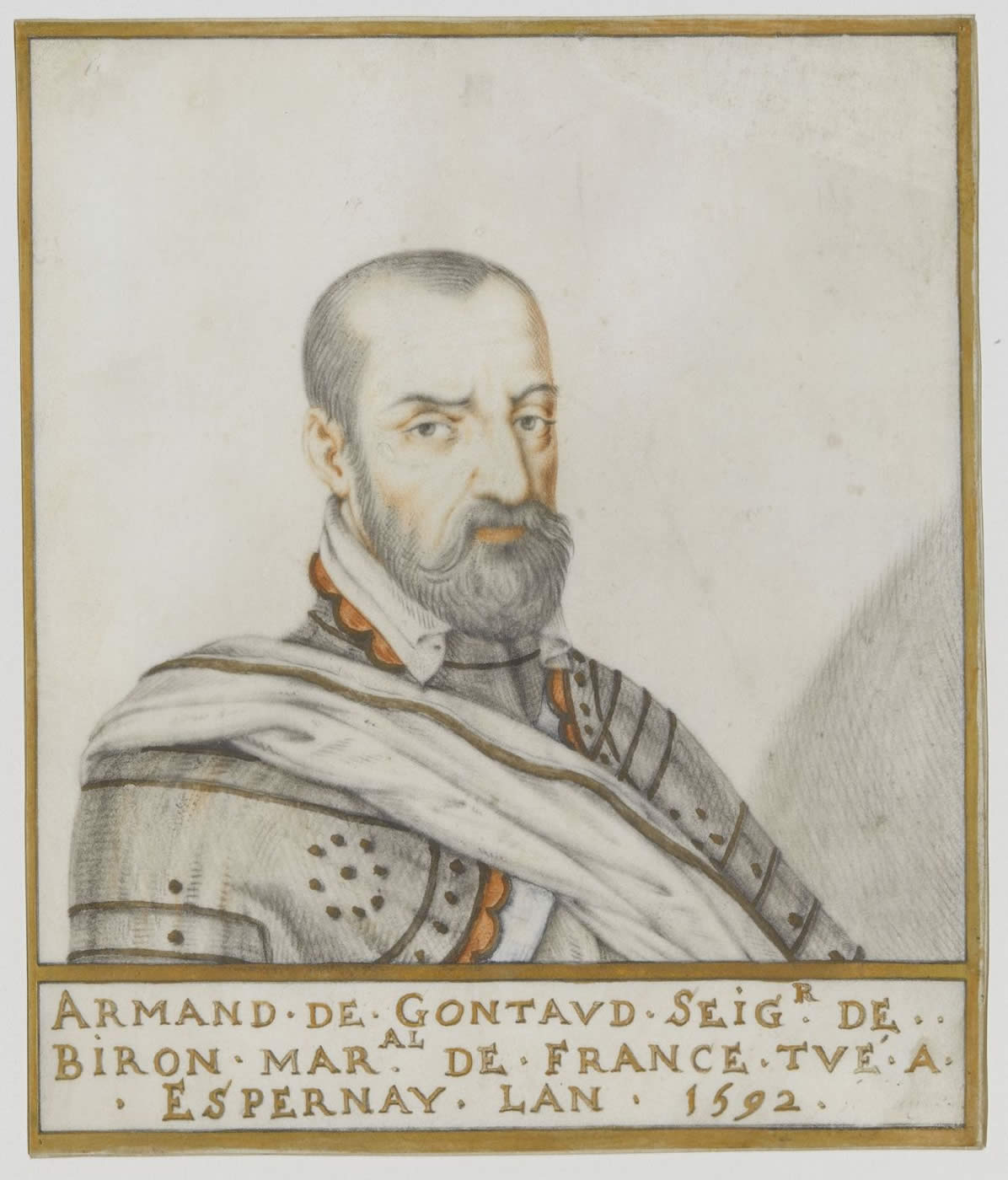
French Marshal Armand de Gontaut, Baron de Biron, by Thierry Bellange.

The combined army was virtually destroyed and retreated in disarray to the fortress of Bergen op Zoom and other towns controlled by the Dutch rebels, and the Spanish troops took with little opposition Steenbergen. A few days later, the lack of pay and the differences between the French soldiers (mostly Catholics) and the Dutch and English Protestant troops (even the differences between the Dutch and English commanders), ended with hundreds of desertions among Biron's troops.

== Consequences ==
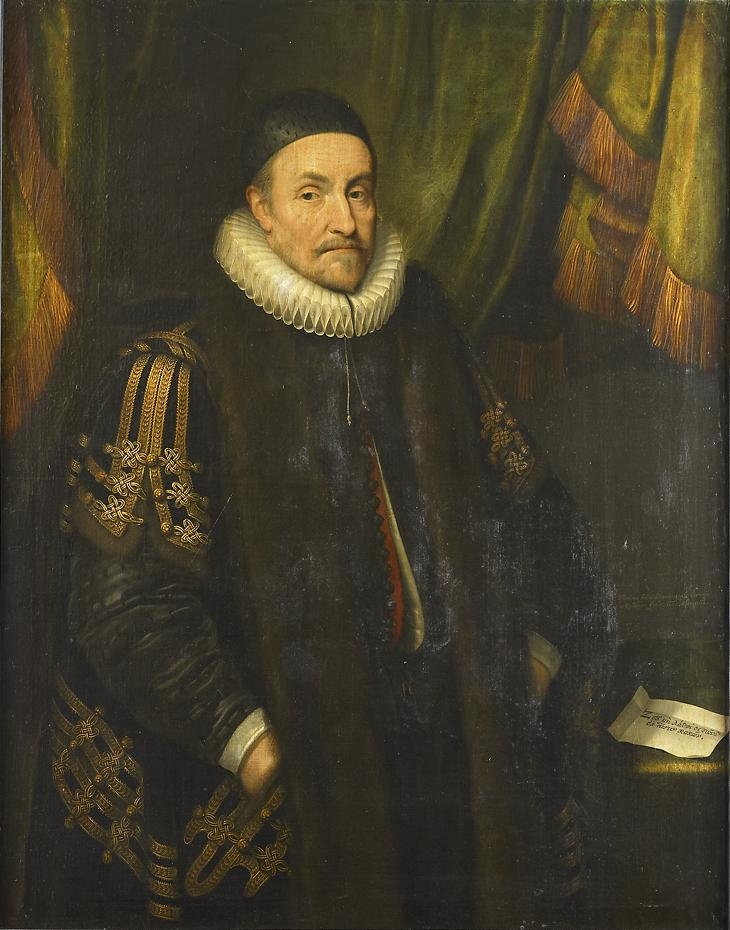
Prince William of Orange by Michiel Jansz. van Mierevelt.

The result of the battle was an overwhelming Spanish victory, not only in terms of casualties in favour of the Spaniards, also in terms of immediate strategic consequences. The position of Francis, Duke of Anjou, became impossible to hold with the States-General of the Netherlands, and he eventually left the Low Countries in late June. The defeat and the end of the Treaty of Plessis-les-Tours was a severe blow to the Dutch Protestants and discredited William of Orange, his main supporter. Moreover, the Spanish progress was unstoppable, and the Prince of Parma moved to Dunkirk, a city blocked by the forces of the Spanish commander Don Cristóbal de Mondragón. On 16 July the bombardment began, and a few days later, the city surrendered to the Spaniards, along with Nieuwpoort on 23 July.

The Spanish army continued its advance, and after the possibility of putting under siege the port city of Ostend, the plan was abandoned, and the bulk of the army advanced to Diksmuide, that capitulated on 1 August. Meanwhile, a Spanish detachment also captured Veurne and Menen.
