= Demographics of Antwerp =

- Population pyramid of Antwerp in 2022
- Population: 530,630 (2022)

The demographics of Antwerp are monitored by Statistics Belgium. The population of the city as of 2022 is currently 530,630.

== Population ==
Population history of the city of Antwerp:

- 1374: 18,000
- 1486: 40,000
- 1500: around 44/49,000 inhabitants
- 1526: 50,000
- 1567: 105,000 (90,000 permanent residents and 15,000 "floating population", including foreign merchants and soldiers. At the time only 10 cities in Europe reached this size.)
- 1584: 84,000 (after the Spanish Fury, the French Fury and the Calvinist republic)
- 1586 (May): 60,000 (after siege)
- 1586 (October): 50,000
- 1591: 46,000
- 1612: 54,000
- 1620: 66,000 (Twelve Years' Truce)
- 1640: 54,000 (after the Black Death epidemics)
- 1700: 66,000
- 1765: 40,000
- 1784: 51,000
- 1800: 45,500
- 1815: 54,000
- 1830: 73,500
- 1856: 111,700
- 1880: 179,000
- 1900: 275,100
- 1925: 308,000
- 1959: 260,000

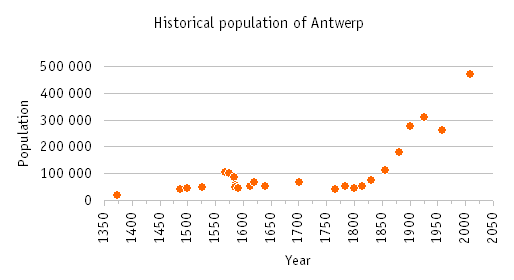
Population of Antwerp over time by population projections from 2008 included

=== Growth rate ===
Antwerp as a city has grown and declined in population size throughout its history.

=== Age structure ===
The age structure of the city is as follows for 2022;

Age structure	2022		
Age structure	Under 18	18 to 64	65 and older
Population	119,762	324,378	86,490
Percentage	22.6%	61.1%	16.3%

=== Fertility and births ===
In 2019, a total of 7,398 were born in total

=== Gender ===
There are slightly more men in the city of Antwerp than females.

Gender structure	2022	
Gender structure	Men	Women
Population number	266,100	264,530
Percentage	50.15%	49.85%

== Language ==
As in all Flemish provinces, the official and standard language of the Antwerp province is Dutch. As with Flemish Brabant, North Brabant and Brussels, the local dialect is a Brabantian variety.

== Religion ==
The Religion of the City of Antwerp has historically been that of Roman Catholic. Due to modern migration however, there has been an introduction of non-Christian religions to the city such as the growth of Islam.

Antwerp is one of the few remaining European cities with a large Haredi (or Ultra Orthodox) Jewish population. The Jewish population numbers around 20,000 in total with a large portion belonging to the Ultra Orthodox community.

The Jewish community was once heavily involved in the diamond trade, however in recent years, immigrants from Gujarat in India have largely taken over the sector, with the vast majority of them being adherents of the Jain faith, making Antwerp also one of the few European cities with a substantial Jain population.

== Origin ==
In 2010, 36% to 39% of the inhabitants of Antwerp had a migrant background.

Nationality (by citizenship)	Population – 2020 (all districts)
Belgium	415,747
Netherlands	20,103
Morocco	11,780
Poland	8,387
Spain	6,221
Afghanistan	4,539
Bulgaria	4,376
Turkey	4,360
Romania	4,131
Iraq	3,082
Portugal	3,043
Syria	2,894
India	2,389
Algeria	2,364
Italy	2,322
France	2,017
Others	34,659

In 2022, 22% of the city did not have Belgian nationality (classified as a 'non-Belgian').

Group of origin	Year									
Group of origin	2001		2006		2011		2016		2023	
Group of origin	Number	%	Number	%	Number	%	Number	%	Number	%
Belgians with Belgian background	340,130	76.3%	316,993	68.7%	291,499	59.1%	268,317	51.9%	235,374	43.7%
Belgians with foreign background	50,378	11.3%	85,171	18.5%	115,236	23.3%	143,009	27.6%	178,476	33.1%
Neighboring country	10,344	2.3%	11,911		13,387		14,820		17,132	3.2%
EU27 (excluding neighboring country)	5,179	1.2%	6,328		7,518		9,181		12,514	2.3%
Outside EU 27	34,855	7.8%	66,932		94,331		119,008		148,830	27.6%
Non-Belgians	55,062	12.3%	59,332	12.9%	86,782	17.6%	105,716	20.4%	125,060	23.2%
Neighboring country	11,515	2.6%	13,385		18,810		22,588		23,253	4.3%
EU27 (excluding neighboring country)	7,130	1.6%	9,215		18,557		28,197		33,109	6.1%
Outside EU 27	36,417	8.2%	36,732		49,415		54,931		68,698	12.7%
Total	445,570	100%	461,496	100%	493,517	100%	517,042	100%	538,910	100%
