= Armand de Gontaut, Baron of Biron =

French marshal and diplomat (1524–1592)

Armand de Gontaut
- Baron of Biron
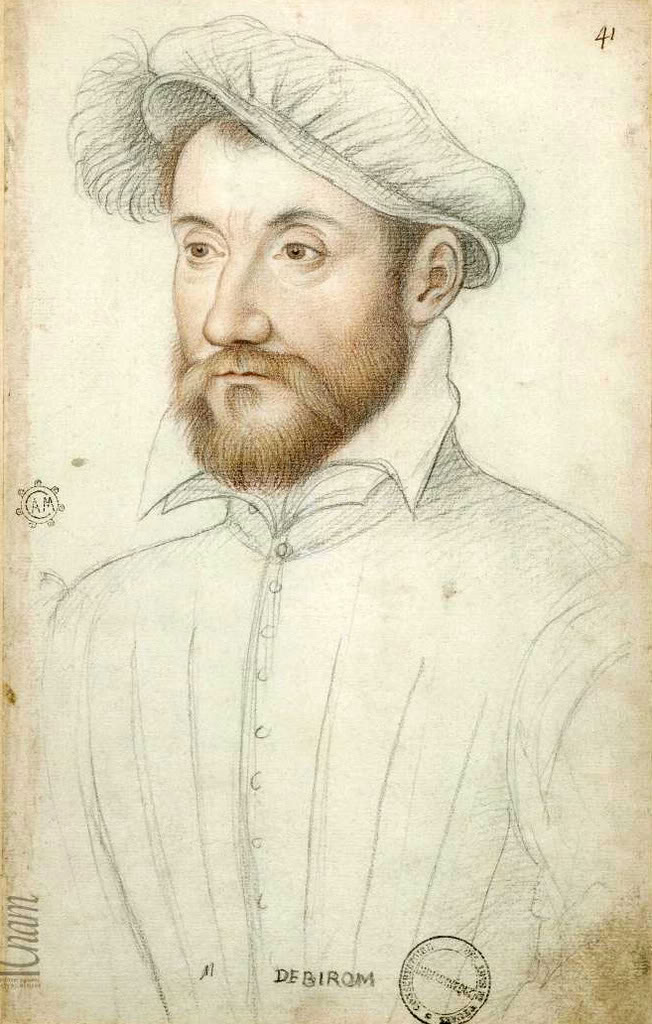
- Sixteenth-century portrait of Biron.
- Other titles: Marshal of France
- Born: January 1524; Kingdom of France
- Died: 26 July 1592 (aged 68); Épernay, Kingdom of France
- Family: Famille de Gontaut
- Spouse: Jeanne, dame d'Ornezan
- Issue: Charles, 1st Duke of Biron

Armand de Gontaut, Baron of Biron (French pronunciation: [aʁmɑ̃ də ɡɔ̃to], 1524 – 26 July 1592) was a soldier, diplomat and Marshal of France. Beginning his service during the Italian Wars, Biron served in Italy under Marshal Brissac and Guise in 1557 before rising to command his own cavalry regiment. Returning to France with the Peace of Cateau-Cambrésis he took up his duties in Guyenne, where he observed the deteriorating religious situation that was soon to devolve into the French Wars of Religion. He fought at the Battle of Dreux in the first civil war. In the peace that followed he attempted to enforce the terms on the rebellious governorship of Provence.

Having fought for the crown during the decisive victory at Battle of Moncontour in 1569, he was elevated to the post of grandmaster of artillery. In this role he was tasked with reducing the town of Saint-Jean-d'Angély which proved resistant to his efforts. As the war dragged on he found himself increasingly involved in diplomatic efforts, meeting with Jeanne d'Albret repeatedly to talk terms. With peace declared in August 1570 he continued his negotiations with Albret in the hopes of setting up a marriage between her son Navarre and Margaret of Valois. In the wake of the Massacre of Saint Bartholomew he was tasked with reducing the well defended city of La Rochelle, commanding the artillery batteries he made limited progress over the following months, before Anjou oversaw peace negotiations so that he might depart for the Poland-Lithuanian Commonwealth.

Upon Henri III's ascent as French king Biron was appointed as a Marshal. His forces were involved in containing Condé as he tried to re-enter France during the fifth civil war. He was involved again as a diplomat in conducting negotiations in the late 1570s, fighting again in the sixth civil war. When in 1573 Alençon who had become sovereign of the Dutch requested reinforcements to secure his position in the country. Biron led troops to support his administration. He would not be involved in the French Fury that saw Alençon's position collapse in the country. With the dominance of the Ligue in the following years Biron half heartedly pursued their objectives before supporting Henri when he broke with the Ligue in 1588. With the king's death in 1589, he transferred his loyalties to Navarre, aiding him in his campaigns in Normandy against the Ligue. It was during a siege of a Ligue town that he was hit by a cannonball and killed.

== Early life and family ==
His family, one of the numerous branches of the House of Gontaut, took its title from the territory of Biron, then in Périgord, where on a hill between the Dropt and the Lède the Château de Biron still stands, begun by the lords of Biron in the 11th century.

Biron, born in 1524, served as a page of Queen Marguerite de Navarre. He was a man of considerable literary attainments, and used to carry a pocketbook, in which he noted everything that appeared remarkable. Some of his letters are preserved in the Bibliothèque nationale and in the British Museum; these include a treatise on the art of war. His son, Charles de Gontaut, duc de Biron (1562–1602), also became Marshal of France in 1594. A grandson of his second son, Henry, was Charles-Armand de Gontaut, another Marshal of France.

== Reign of Henri II ==
Biron attracted the notice of the Marshal Brissac, with whom he saw active service in Italy. A wound he received in his early years made him lame for life, and gave him the nickname Armand Le Boiteux (the limper). He did not however withdraw from his military career, and he held a command in Guise's regiment of light horse in 1557. A short while later he became chief of a cavalry regiment.

== Reign of Francis II ==
In 1560 Biron reported to the crown concerning the situation he faced in Guyenne with disaffected nobles turning to Protestantism.

== Reign of Charles IX ==
=== First civil war ===
During the fighting of the first civil war, he fought for the crown at the Battle of Dreux in December 1562.

=== Long peace ===
The Edict of Amboise brought an end to the first war of religion in March 1563. To ensure that its terms would be followed across France, commissioners were sent out to oversee its implementation and resolve disputes. Biron was sent to Provence, where there were reports of problems in implementing the peace. Upon arriving he reduced the hold out town of Sisteron which had not relinquished its Protestant garrison. He further reinstalled the governor Tende who had been chased out of Provence by his own son during the civil war. He reported back to the crown in April 1564 that both the commissioners and those who desired to lodge complaints about the enforcement were being intimidated by the local nobility. Specifically among the nobility he singled out Sommerive and Carcès as particularly troublesome and recommended they be called to court to answer for their actions. He further opined that only the full weight of royal authority on the region would bring about the obedience of the king's edict. In the same year, Biron wrote to Catherine asking to be relieved of his office in Guyenne.

=== Saint-Jean-d'Angély ===
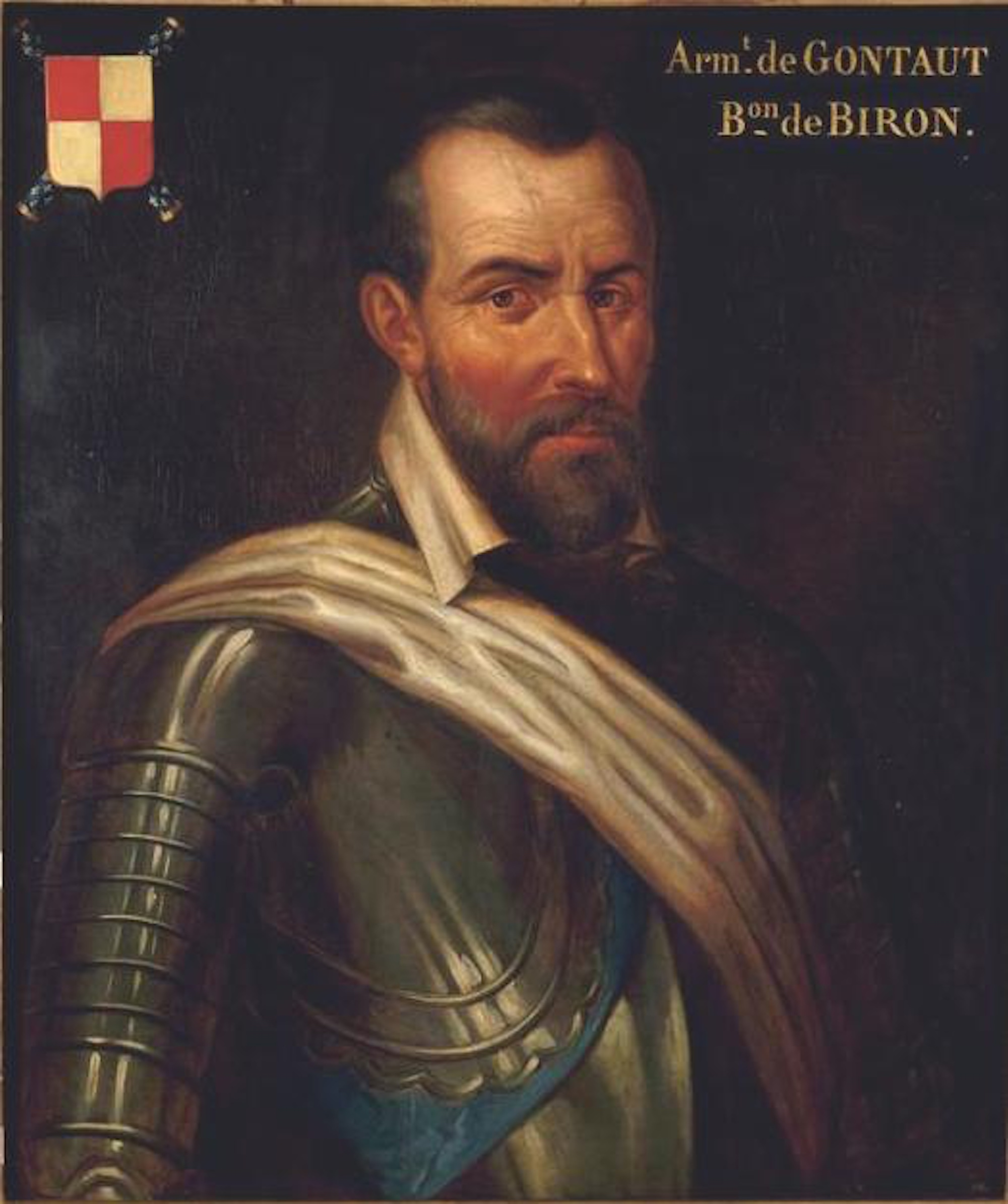
Portrait Armand de Gontaut-Biron

With victory at the Battle of Moncontour several marshals advocated using the opportunity to secure a favourable settlement, among them Biron. The crown refused and pressed on to break the Huguenot strongholds in the south. The first stronghold in their way was that of Saint-Jean-d'Angély. Biron was raised to the post of grand master of artillery and starting on 26 October tasked with reducing the town. Progress was slow, several assaults were bloodily repulsed, disease and hunger ran rampant in the royal camp. By the time the city had surrendered on 2 December the royal army was a broken shell. Brantôme relates an anecdote where after the surrender, Biron attacked his men who dishonored the terms of surrender by pillaging from the captured garrison.

=== Diplomat ===
Alongside his military role in the war he also conducted diplomatic missions. When in February 1570 the Protestants sent demands to the court, Biron was sent along with de Mesmes to communicate the king's rejection of their terms. Having urged the king to keep the negotiations going, at the very least to learn the rebels intentions, he had a meeting with Coligny in March. Beyond the formal peace declared in August 1570, Biron's role as a negotiator would continue, now for the Navarre marriage instead of peace. He received Albret for an interview to negotiate the match in March 1571. His involvement in the negotiations continued over the following months until in December he prepared to escort her to Paris, to discuss directly with Catherine de'Medici, after some delays around Nérac they continued on to the capital in January. With the marriage contract concluded, Biron arranged for the young Navarre's journey to Paris, and was with him when news of his mother's death arrived.

=== La Rochelle ===
Shortly after the Massacre of Saint Bartholomew the town of La Rochelle filled with refugees from across France. The crown was conscious the town could be the nucleus of resistance and Biron was named governor of the city, with the aim of the town submitting peacefully to him. When he attempted to enter the city, his entry was rebuffed. Negotiations continued until November, Biron and the crown remembering the difficulties the far less well defended city of Saint-Jean-d'Angély had presented, and desiring to avoid a siege. However no agreement would be reached and a siege would be agreed upon when news of La Rochelle's negotiations with the English were reported.

To this end men and munitions flooded south to Biron throughout December and into January 1573. Biron's preparations continued slowly, as he had to prepare for both land and sea attacks. By the time Anjou arrived in February, he had completed the investment of the town from land, but the harbour remained only partially closed, and no approach trenches had been dug. Anjou now took over as overall commander, successfully completing the closure at sea. By April the approach trenches had reached the walls. Assaults began in the following months, as the artillery reduced the area into a smouldering ruin. Desertions ran rampant and by the time the outer wall was breached in June Anjou was increasingly tired of the siege. He excoriated Biron for what he felt were his failings in conducting the siege. Concurrently Anjou had been elected king of Poland, and he took the excuse to negotiate a peace. As a term of this settlement, Biron was at last allowed his brief entry into the town. Throughout the siege, Biron's batteries had fired 25,000 rounds.

== Reign of Henri III ==
=== Fifth civil war ===
With Henri's return to France from Spain, he was keen to counteract the military influence that Retz had accrued as a favourite of Catherine in the proceeding years. To this end Biron was appointed as a marshal. In response, Retz resigned his role of Constable that he had held in Henri's Polish administration.

With civil war resumed in between the crown and the politiques there was fear at court that Condé, who was in Germany, would enter the kingdom with his forces. To prevent this, and allow the crown to focus on subduing Damville in Languedoc, Biron and the young Guise were sent out to monitor the frontier. They arrived at Langres with 8000 men. The king continued to send forces to Langres to bolster the army, for the eventual crossing of Condé, which occurred in October, Guise leading the army that defeated them at Dormans.

=== Informal war ===
In January 1577 as France again found itself on the brink of civil war with the Huguenots at arms, Henri, little interested in a war that would leave him at the mercy of the Ligue sent out envoys to the key Protestant aristocrats, hoping to bring them into line such that formal conflict could be averted. Biron was sent with a message to Navarre, a mixture of reassurances about the crowns friendliness to him, and concerns about his actions. Navarre sent a contrite reply, but held several objections to the king's position, and another debate on the conseil privé erupted over whether to go to war. With the peace faction winning, Biron was again sent to Navarre on 3 March to continue negotiations. While these were ongoing the military situation of his supporters deteriorated into war. Navarre maintained his desire for peace, and the two sides were able to come to terms in the Treaty of Bergerac in September 1577.

Navarre complained bitterly about Biron's role as lieutenant-general of Guyenne, bemoaning that he was governor in name only given how much authority his subordinate had. In February 1579 he resigned as lieutenant-general of Saintonge and Aunis in favour of the sieur de Belleville. Biron, as lieutenant-general of Guyenne was responsible for overseeing some of the concessions granted to the Protestants in the Treaty of Nérac, however he would not implement them all. As a result, the Protestants of the region began re-arming, and Navarre took the excuse to seize the town of Cahors in May 1580. He took a brief leave in 1580 after he fell off a horse whilst campaigning at Toulouse, and while recovering appointed his son Charles to lead his forces.

=== Netherlands ===
The king's younger brother Alençon seeking advancement accepted the offer from William the Silent to become sovereign of the United Provinces of the Netherlands in 1579, entering the country in 1582. In 1581 with Spanish fears about what Alençon might be planning, Biron was sent to Picardy to guard the border in case Spain took the offensive. The following year Alençon now in the low countries was struggling to exert control his army depleted by the harsh winter. Biron and Montpensier were tasked with reinforcing him. Biron arrived with 3500 foot and several companies of cavalry on 1 December 1582. He would grow restless and unsatisfied with the territories he ruled, and sought to surprise the city of Antwerp to add it to his dominion. The attempt was a disaster, and his force was trapped in the city and destroyed during the French Fury, Biron and Montpensier were uninvolved in his attempt on the city. Bellièvre was sent to the Netherlands to smooth things other with the States. He achieved great success and the States invited Biron to relieve the siege of Eindhoven which was under attack by the Spanish. In April however Eindhoven capitulated and Biron moved his forces to Roosendaal. Increasingly out of cash Biron begged for funds almost daily but without result, his army disintegrated from desertions before his eyes. Biron angrily blamed the estates for the failure of his expedition. Money was at last advanced from France to pay for the remnants of Biron's army to withdraw from the Netherlands.

With the death of Alençon the following year, Biron accompanied his body back to Paris for the lavish funeral overseen by Henri.

=== Ligue ===
Compelled by the Ligue to make war on the politiques in 1585, Henri tasked Matignon and Biron with prosecuting the war against Navarre in Guyenne. The two Marshals prosecuted the campaign half heartedly, and only the forces directly loyal to the Ligue under Mercœur conducted the war with any vigour. Biron secretly negotiated with Navarre in July 1586 and in the following month a truce was established by the two.

In 1587, with a German army invading in support of the Protestants under Casimir a council was held by Henri to decide how to proceed. Henri announced to the assembled nobles his desire to lead the French army out to destroy the invader, explaining it would allow him to regain authority from the Ligue. Biron and all the other councillors except Nevers expressed their horror at this idea.

=== Day of the Barricades ===
By 1588 the situation in Paris was tense, the Ligue, increasingly dominant, orchestrated a coup in the city, with Guise at its head. Those out on the barricades threatened bloody violence on the loyalists, unless the royal and Swiss troops were removed from the city. Henri ordered the troops withdrawn to the Louvre, and tasked François d'O, Jean VI d'Aumont and Biron with leading them off the streets. Small fights would break out however, and the lives of the Swiss were at risk from the crowd. The king sent Biron to meet with the duke of Guise, and Guise agreed to provide them passage to safety from the violent crowd.

== Reign of Henri IV ==
With the assassination of Henri III outside Paris, Biron was among the marshals that recognised the legitimacy of Navarre as king immediately, and went over to support him in his fights with the Ligue. He fought alongside the king at the Battle of Ivry in Normandy, where the leading Liguer Mayenne was defeated. He was killed by a cannonball at the siege of Épernay on 26 July 1592.

== Sources ==
- Harding, Robert (1978). Anatomy of a Power Elite: the Provincial Governors in Early Modern France. Yale University Press.
- Holt, Mack (2002). The Duke of Anjou and the Politique Struggle During the Wars of Religion. Cambridge University Press.
- Holt, Mack P. (2005). The French Wars of Religion, 1562-1629. Cambridge University Press.
- Knecht, Robert (1998). Catherine de' Medici. Routledge.
- Knecht, Robert (2010). The French Wars of Religion, 1559-1598. Routledge.
- Knecht, Robert (2016). Hero or Tyrant? Henry III, King of France, 1574-1589. Routledge.
- Roberts, Penny (2013). Peace and Authority during the French Religious Wars c.1560-1600. Palgrave Macmillan.
- Roelker, Nancy (1968). Queen of Navarre: Jeanne d'Albret 1528-1572. Harvard University Press.
- Salmon, J.H.M (1975). Society in Crisis: France during the Sixteenth Century. Metheun & Co.
- Sutherland, Nicola (1980). The Huguenot Struggle for Recognition. Yale University Press.
- Thompson, James (1909). The Wars of Religion in France 1559-1576: The Huguenots, Catherine de Medici and Philip II. Chicago University Press.
- Wood, James (2002). The Kings Army: Warfare, Soldiers and Society during the Wars of Religion in France, 1562-1576. Cambridge University Press.
