= Treaty of Plessis-les-Tours =

1580 treaty between the Dutch Staten Generaal and François, Duke of Anjou

The Treaty of Plessis-les-Tours was signed on 29 September 1580 between the Dutch Staten Generaal (with the exception of Zeeland and Holland) and François, Duke of Anjou (supported by William the Silent). Based on the terms of the treaty, François assumed the title of "Protector of the Liberty of the Netherlands" and became sovereign of the Dutch Republic. The accord was ratified at Bordeaux on 23 January 1581.

When François attempted to take Antwerp in the French Fury on 17 January 1583, the citizens massacred his army. He withdrew from the Low Countries in June and died of malaria the following year.

== See also ==
- List of treaties
