= French Fury =

1583 Attack on Antwerp

Coordinates: 51°13′N 4°24′E

- Part of the Eighty Years' War
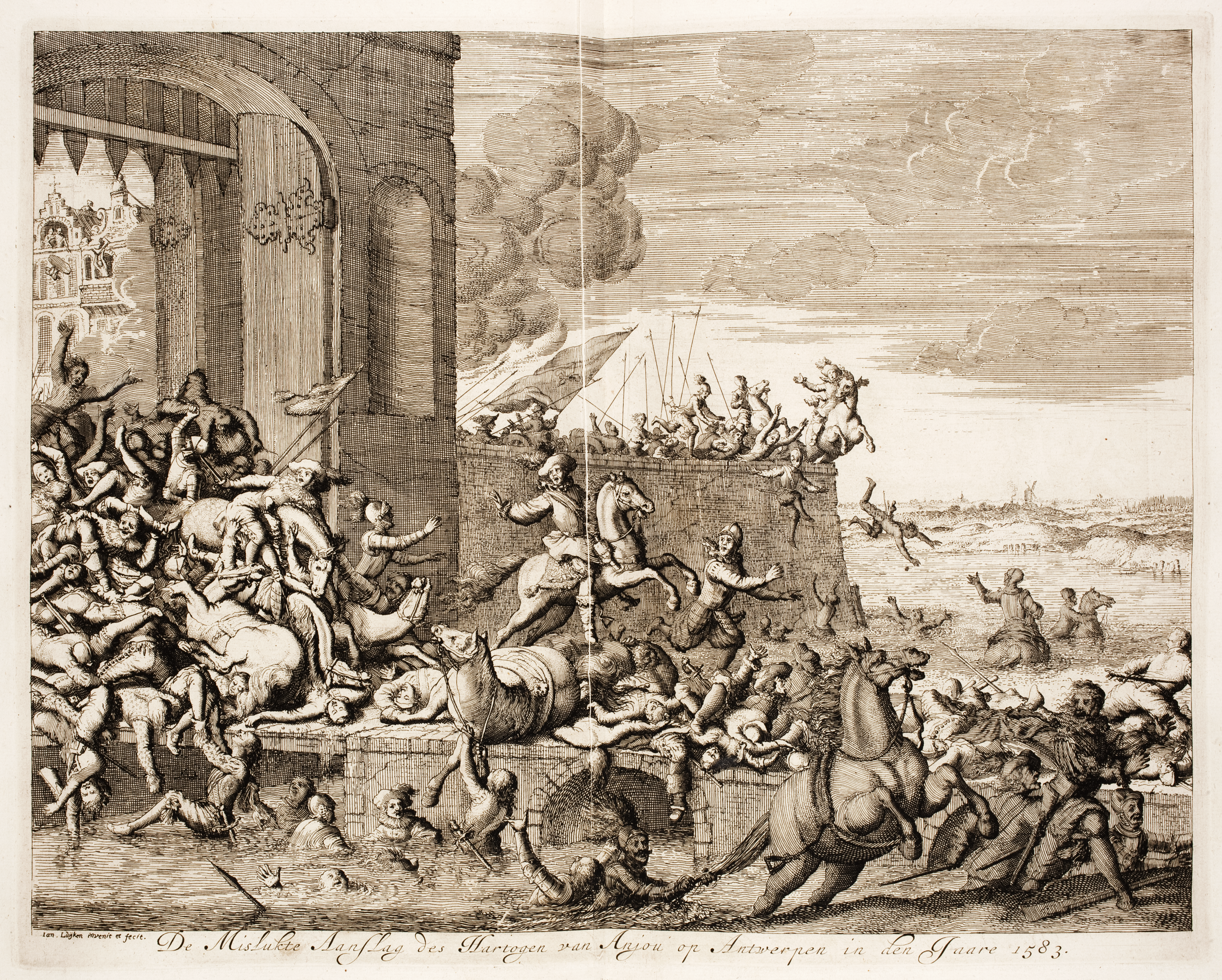
- Attack on Antwerps
Date	17 January 1583
Location	Antwerp (present-day Belgium)
Result	Antwerpian victory

Belligerents
(Kingdom of France) France: Anjou forces	(Dutch Republic) States-General: Antwerpians

Commanders and leaders
Francis, Duke of Anjou	(Dutch Republic) Philips van Marnix

Casualties and losses
1,500+ dead or wounded	

The "French Fury" was a failed attempt by Francis, Duke of Anjou, to conquer the city of Antwerp by surprise on 17 January 1583.

== Background ==
During the Eighty Years' War the States-General had asked in 1581 the Duke to become head of state of the Seventeen Provinces, to obtain French support in expelling the Spanish troops.

Anjou did not have much influence in the Netherlands, and attempted to seize more power. He decided to try to occupy Antwerp, the largest city of the Seventeen Provinces, by surprise. Antwerp had already been comprehensively sacked by Spanish troops in the "Spanish Fury" of 1576.

Unfortunately for Anjou his plan was discovered. The inhabitants, still traumatised by the Spanish plunder seven years earlier, were determined to prevent another occupation by foreign troops by all means possible.

== Attempted coup ==
On 17 January 1583, in a ploy to deceive the citizens of Antwerp, Anjou asked to be permitted to enter the city in order to honour them with a Royal Entry. As soon as his troopers had entered the city, the city gates were slammed shut behind them. Having lost the advantage of surprise, the small French army found itself hopelessly trapped within the city as it was bombarded from windows and rooftops with stones, rocks, logs, and even heavy chains. The city's experienced garrison then opened up with a deadly, point-blank fire on the troops. Only a few Frenchmen, including the Duke of Anjou, escaped. Over 1,500 troops perished, many of them hacked to death by the enraged citizens of Antwerp. One contemporary account is by Jean Bodin, an adviser to Anjou who also escaped the slaughter.

== Aftermath ==
The position of Anjou after this attack became untenable and he left the country in June 1583. His departure also discredited William the Silent, who had always supported Anjou.

The city was eventually conquered by the Spanish under Alexander Farnese, Duke of Parma after the Siege of Antwerp (1584-1585).
