= Jarich van Liauckema =

Dutch nobleman and soldier in Spanish service (1558–1642)

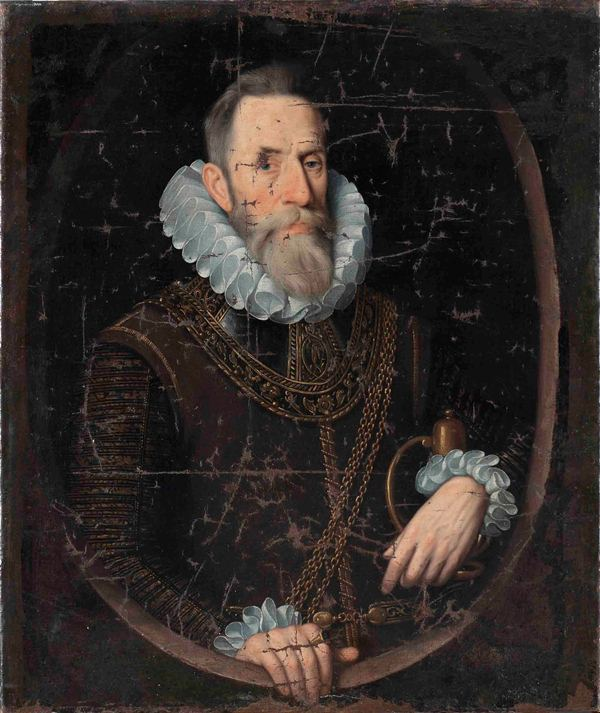
- Jarich van Liauckema (anonymous, 1610)

Governor of Zutphen
- In office 1588–1591
- Preceded by: Jean Baptiste de Tassis

Personal details
- Born: 17 December 1558; Sexbierum, Friesland, Habsburg Netherlands
- Died: 24 August 1642 (aged 83); Sexbierum, Friesland, Dutch Republic
- Resting place: Sixtuskerk, Sexbierum
- Spouse: Sjouck van Cammingha (m. 1585; died 1620)
- Children: Jel (Juliana) van Liauckama; Tryn (Catharina) van Liauckama

Military service
- Allegiance: Spanish Empire
- Branch/service: Infantry
- Rank: Lieutenant colonel
- Commands: Frisian Regiment
- Battles/wars: Capture of Steenwijk; Battle of Boksum; Siege of Zutphen; Siege of Groningen

Jarich or George van Liauckema (17 December 1558 – 24 August 1642) was a Frisian nobleman and soldier in Spanish service in the Eighty Years' War. Between 1588 and 1591 Van Liauckema was governor of Zutphen. Some time after the Siege of Groningen he returned to Friesland, where in 1618 he again came into possession of the ancestral castle of the Van Liauckema family, the Liauckamastate in Sexbierum.

== Early life ==
Jarich was born as the son of Schelte van Liauckema (c. 1519–1579) and his third wife Jel van Dekema (1529–1583) at the Liauckamastate in Sexbierum. His father appeared in 1569 as substitute grietman of Barradeel. Schelte chose the Spanish side and therefore had to flee to the vicinity of Oldenzaal in 1577 where he died in 1579.

== Military service ==
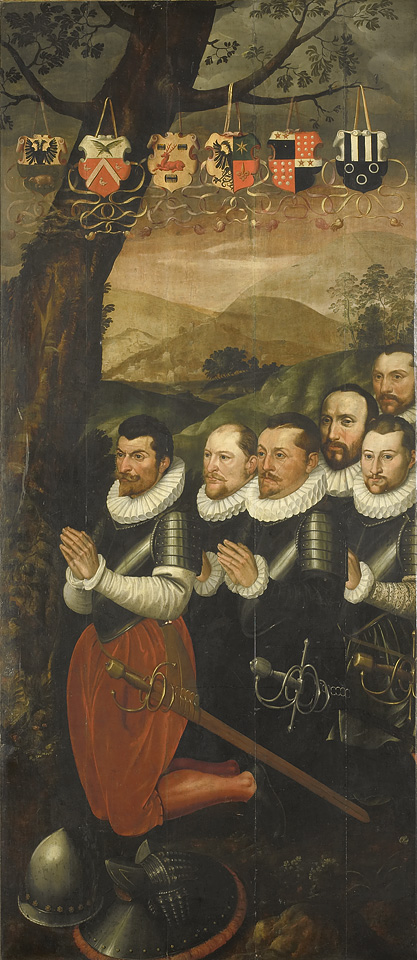
Van Liauckema (fourth from the left) together with leader Jean Baptiste de Tassis (red trousers) and brother-in-law Tiete van Cammingha (third from the left) on an altarpiece from Huissen dating from 1586

Jarich fled Friesland in 1580, after which he entered Spanish service. He started as vaandrig, but in 1582 he was involved as a captain, together with his brother-in-law Tiete van Cammingha, in the Capture of Steenwijk under the command of Jean Baptiste de Tassis. He was also a captain under De Tassis when he was sent to Friesland by Francisco Verdugo in the winter of 1585. They met on 17 January 1586 in the Battle of Boksum.

After De Tassis was killed in the Siege of Bonn in 1588, Van Liauckema succeeded him as governor of Zutphen. Van Liauckema had by then reached the rank of lieutenant colonel. After conquering Doesburg on 23 May 1591, Maurice of Orange marched on Zutphen the next day. Although outnumbered, Van Liauckema initially refused to call for reinforcements. The Siege of Zutphen followed and on 30 May Van Liauckema capitulated. He stipulated a free passage for his soldiers, after which he left the city plundering its surroundings. As a result, Van Liauckema fell in the esteem of Verdugo, who believed that Van Liauckema had abandoned the city without good reason. In his report, Verdugo therefore refuses to mention Van Liauckema by name. He was also advised not to meet Alexander Farnese, Duke of Parma, then governor of the Spanish Netherlands.

After Verdugo had tried–in vain–to recapture Coevorden from Maurice of Orange, he abandoned the siege on 7 May 1594. Verdugo himself remained behind with the army in Twente and sent Van Liauckema with 400 infantry to Groningen. In Groningen, Van Liauckema commanded 900 Spanish soldiers stationed in the Schuitenschuiverskwartier east of the city. Maurice and William Louis arrived in Helpman on 22 May 1594. On 18 February, a new delegation had already left Groningen for Brussels to ask for Spanish support. On 24 June, Ernest of Austria announced that a relief army would be assembled. This caused much disagreement within the city between the proponents and opponents of peace negotiations with the States Army, the Staatsen. Eventually, the Spanish soldiers from the Schuitenschuiverskwartier entered the city to thwart the negotiations. Van Liauckema, by courageous action, prevented the soldiers from clashing with a civilian company. He remained in solidarity with the city council and would defend Groningen as long as possible, but it would never be relieved. After the blowing up of a ravelin by the Staatsen on 15 July, the city was prepared to negotiate peace. On 23 July, the Tractaat van Reductie (Treaty of Reduction) was signed and the city passed into the hands of the Staatsen. Van Liauckema had stipulated that the soldiers would be taken in convoy to Verdugo's army in Twente, in armour, with a flying banner and a beating drum. They then marched to Oldenzaal but had to continue, across the Rhine, since it had also been agreed that they were not allowed to carry out any military operations north of this river for three months.

After Van Liauckema's departure from Groningen, little is known about his further military career. However, a passport of Jarich van Liauckema from 1598 has been preserved in the house archives of the Liauckamastate. At that time, he was still in the service of Albert VII, Archduke of Austria, as a lieutenant colonel. In 1604, Jarich travelled to Leeuwarden with his brother-in-law Adam van Paffenrode to tender the gravestone for his sister Anna and her husband Tjepcke van Goslinga. According to a letter from his brother-in-law Wytze van Cammingha, Van Liauckema was in Paderborn in 1605, where his brother Sixtus was a priest. In 1611, Jarich requested to travel to Brabant with his family and household effects.

== Later life and death ==
After signing the Twelve Years' Truce, Jarich returned to Friesland. In 1614, Jarich tried to regain possession of the Liauckamastate. After the Liauckamastate was partially burned down in 1580 by the troops of Diederik Sonoy, the estate was rebuilt and Jarich's eldest sister Sjouck moved into the estate with her second husband Ofcke van Feytsma. After her death in 1599, Tjalling van Camstra, son from her first marriage to Homme van Camstra, went to live on the estate. After Tjalling's death in 1614, Jarich resisted this and started a lawsuit, initially in vain. Eventually, Van Liauckema was proven right in 1618 and he came into possession of the estate.

Although Van Liauckema remained a Catholic, he seems to have reconciled himself with the Protestants, as he was one of those present at the funeral of Ernest Casimir of Nassau-Dietz in 1633. He did, however, continue to support the Catholic cause. For example, the house archives of the Liauckamastate contain a number of documents concerning the legal position of Catholics and he was probably the person who collected them in order to defend his position and that of the Catholic community. He also worked to release an imprisoned priest in 1618, and in 1633 he offered shelter to the escaped Jesuit priest Nikolaas Creps, leader of the Counter-Reformation in Meppen.

Jarich died on 24 August 1642 at the age of 84. Both Jarich and his wife Sjouck have letters of condolence with lists of guests for the funeral ceremonies. One of the guests was Frans van Donia. In 1824, a mourning board of Jarich van Liauckema in the church of Sexbierum was mentioned, but this board is no longer present.

== Personal life ==
Jarich married Sjouck Tietesdr van Cammingha (d. 1620) around 1585. She was the daughter of Tiete van Cammingha and Tryn van Hottinga. They had two daughters. The eldest was Jel or Juliana (1585–1650). She married Eraert van Pipenpoy in 1616. The wedding party became known as the Pipenpoyse bruiloft (transl. Pipenpoy wedding). Eraert's father François had previously come to Friesland following George de Lalaing's footsteps. This François appears in 1578 as grietman of Hemelumer Oldeferd and as bailiff in Stavoren. When Jel became a widow, she moved permanently to the Liauckamastate with her daughter Sophia Anna van Pipenpoy. Sophia Anna died childless in 1670, after which the estate came into the hands of her cousin, Alexander Josephus van der Laen.

The second daughter was Tryn or Catharina (1592–1656). She married Dierick van der Laen, lord of Schriek and Grootlo and mayor of Mechelen, on 4 August 1616. Their son Alexander Josephus obtained the Liauckamastate after the death of his cousin Sophia Anna.

== Gallery ==
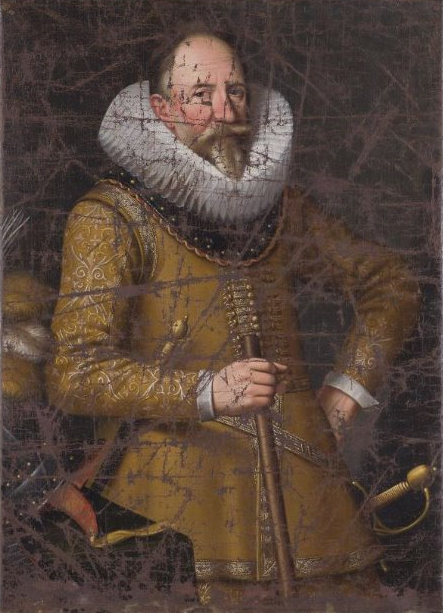
Jarich van Liauckema (anonymous, 1619)

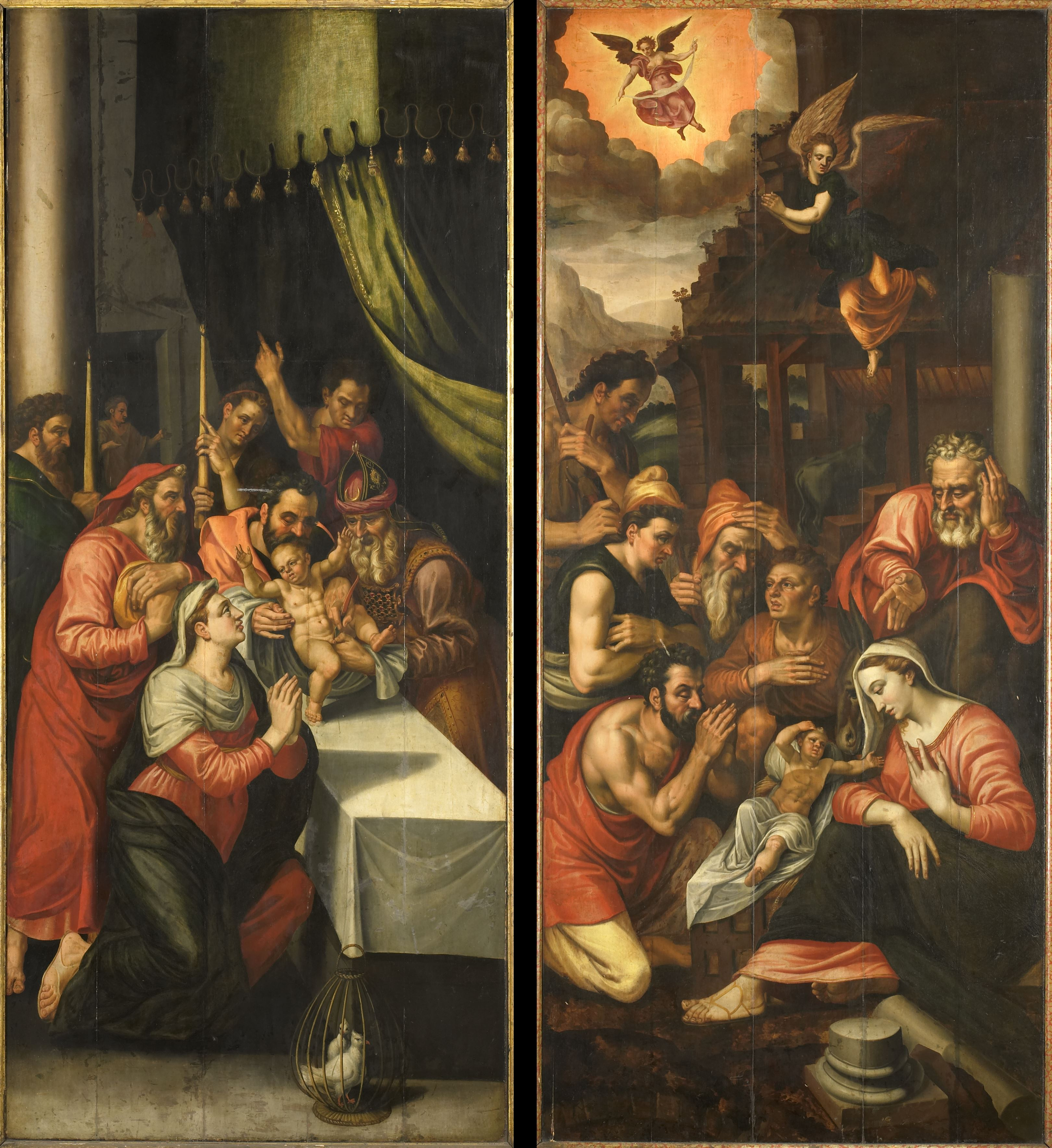
Side panel of an altarpiece, c. 1570. From left to right: Jean Baptiste de Tassis, a Lord of Ensse, Tiete van Cammingha, Jarich van Liauckema, Jacob van Claerhout, and a Lord of Boisot

== See also ==
- Liauckamastate
