= Liauckamastate =

Former stins in Sexbierum, Netherlands

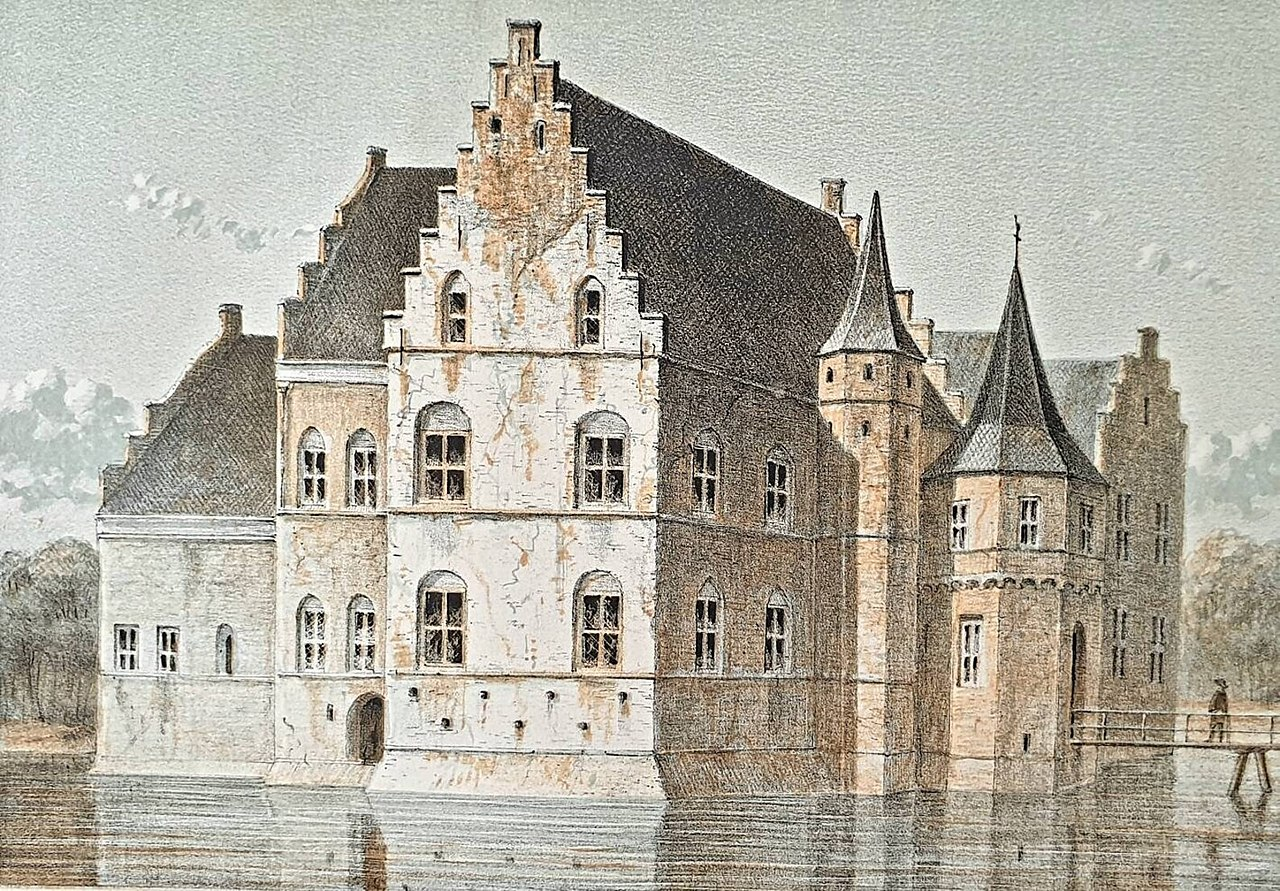
- Liauckamastate
- Interactive map of the Liauckamastate area
- Alternative names: Liauckama State, Liauckemastate, Liauckema State

General information
- Status: Partly demolished
- Type: Stins
- Location: Liauckamaleane 2, 8855 XJ, Sexbierum, Friesland, Netherlands
- Coordinates: 53°13′15″N 5°28′35″E
- Named for: Liauckama family
- Year built: 13th century
- Demolished: 1824

Design and construction
- Designations: Rijksmonument (nr. 8651, 8652, and 8653)

The Liauckamastate or Liauckama State (sometimes spelled as Liauckemastate or Liauckema State) is a former stins near the Dutch village of Sexbierum, Friesland. It was one of Friesland's biggest estates and was inhabited by members of the Liauckama family. Of the old stins, only the gatehouse, farmhouse, and day labourer's house still stand.

The stins is known for the Pipenpoyse bruiloft, a series of paintings that were moved to a safe haven as part of a large collection before the castle was demolished in 1824. The history of the estate and its residents could be partly reconstructed on the basis of this collection, which was transferred to the Fries Museum by the Van Grotenhuis family, descendants of the Liauckama family, in 1963.

== History ==
=== Early history ===
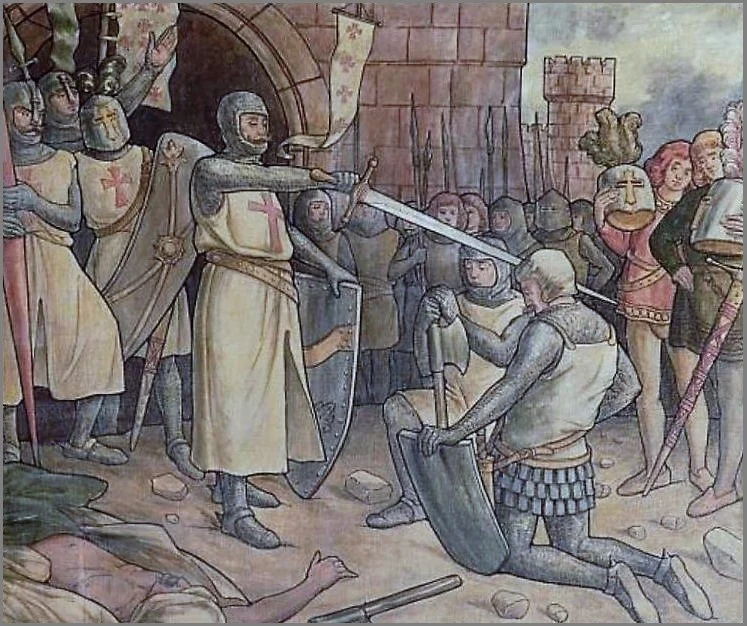
Eelko Liauckama being knighted (1892, mural in the Provinciehuis)

A romanticized historiography from the 16th century assumes that the history of the Liauckama family begins with the crusaders Eelko and Sicko in 1096. These two cousins belonged to the Frisian nobles who participated in the First Crusade and were knighted after the conquest of Jerusalem. Sicko died the following year during the siege of Nicaea. The historicity of these events is dubitable. The Liauckamastate's origin is probably in the 13th century.

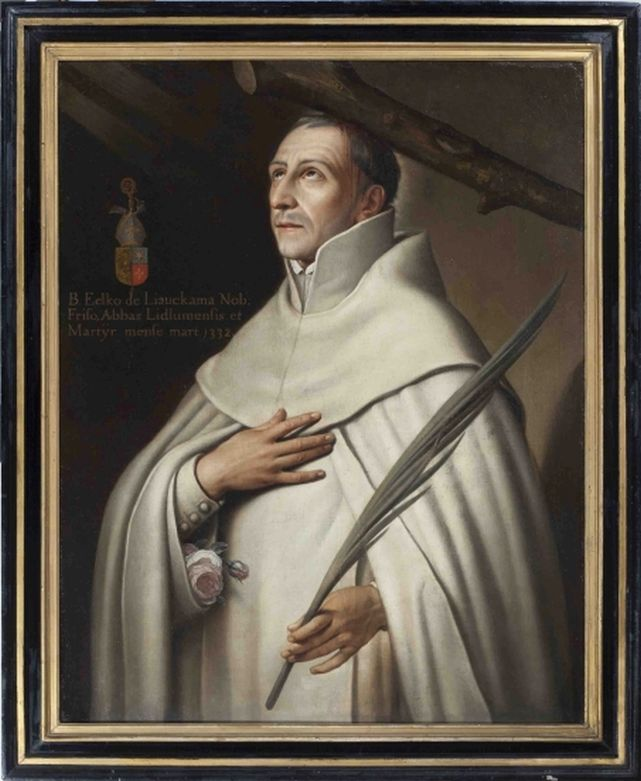
Eelco Liauckama, abbot of Lidlum (Nicolaas Wieringa, 1633)

In Sexbierum, the Liauckama family is mentioned for the first time in 1315. This concerns Eelco Liauckama (c. 1270–1332), who was born on the estate, abbot of the Lidlum monastery, the later Klooster-Lidlum near Tzummarum. Because the Liauckama family had remained Roman Catholic throughout history, the abbot was held in honour by them. According to tradition, a portrait of him was painted around 1672 and was hung on Liauckamastate. This may be the painting that was identified on the estate in 1824.

=== Late Middle Ages ===
Only from the end of the 14th century is the estate mentioned by name and its written history begins with Schelte Liauckema. Schelte belonged to the party of the Vetkopers and was an important ally of Albert I, Duke of Bavaria. The latter granted him the feudal administration of Pietersbierum, Wijnaldum, Pietersbierum, Sexbierum, Minnertsga, Menaldum, De Rijp and Boksum. When the duke was driven out of the region, Schelte went into exile. He and his wife Ebel Hibbema were finally buried in Oosterbierum.

They had two children, namely Schelte (II), who was supposedly married to Tieth thoe Nijenhuisen and died in Sexbierum in 1479, and Trijn. Schelte II and Tieth had three sons, Schelte (III), Sicke, and Epo. The eldest inherited the stins and associated family possessions in the region from his father. When he died, the possessions would not pass to his wife, but directly to the eldest in line of the surviving Liauckama descendants. By the time Schelte III died, Sicke had also died and the possessions therefore passed to the third son, Epo.

Even though the Liauckamastate was equivalent to a castle in terms of defensibility and had thirty soldiers on duty, it was captured by gangs of the Vetkopers in 1498. This was the result of the fact that Schelte III started supporting Albert III, Duke of Saxony, for whom he was grietman of Wymbritseradeel. Albert III was able to take over parts of the region with help of the Schieringers, the rivals of the Vetkopers.

A few weeks later, these occupiers left the estate again, but not without setting it on fire. Despite this setback, the Liauckama's property had increased in the 15th century through strategic marriages with heiress. Around 1500, they were the local authority in the village of Sexbierum: they controlled the poor relief, water management, corn mill, and exercised swan rights. They also had rights to a prebend in the parish church.

=== Dutch Revolt ===
Because the Catholic Liauckama family had chosen the side of the Spanish king during the Dutch Revolt, they lost their political power. However, they remained at the top of the Frisian nobility socially. Schelte van Liauckama (1521–1579) inherited his father's stins and settled at Liauckamastate in 1535, where he married Anna van Herema (d. 1537) the following year. She died in childbirth. Schelte then remarried to Sjouck van Martena (d. 1547), who also died in childbirth. Around 1555, Schelte married a third time, now to Jel van Dekema (d. 1583), who came from a family that was just as pro-royal and Catholic as the Liauckama family. As a pro-Spanish nobleman, Schelte was in favor of Caspar de Robles. In 1579 he had to leave Friesland for his service and died in Oldenzaal.

His wife later returned to the estate but did not have a peaceful time there as the stins was plundered twice. Because the Catholic Liauckema family was on the side of the Spanish, the estate was set on fire in 1580 by the Geuzen troops of Diederik Sonoy. Van Dekema and her family were in the stins and had to be rescued from their dire situation by friends. The building was badly damaged in the battle. Van Dekema eventually died in 1583 at Liauckamastate.

The estate was subjected to a large-scale restoration after the attack of 1580, during which a new chapel, kitchen, and gatehouse were built. Although the work probably lasted until 1602, Sjouck van Liauckama (d. 1599), the eldest of the then-surviving children of Schelte and Jel, then widow of Homme van Camstra (d. 1579), moved into the building as soon as it was habitable. She lived there with her second husband Ofcke van Feytsma.

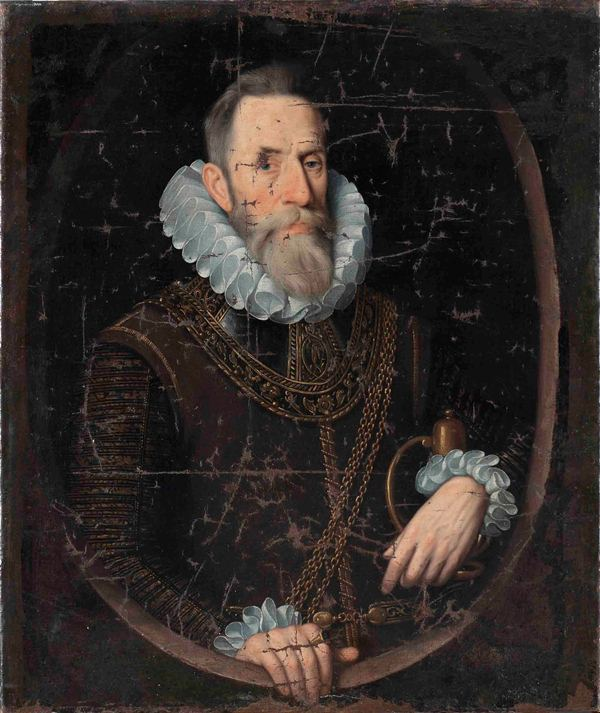
Jarich van Liauckema (anonymous, 1610)

After her death in 1599, her son Tjalling van Camstra (d. 1614) came to live at the Liauckamastate. This in spite of Sjouck's eldest brother, Jarich van Liauckema, who appealed to wills in which the name Liauckama would have priority in the inheritance of the estate. However, the Geus Tjalling van Camstra had politics on his side.

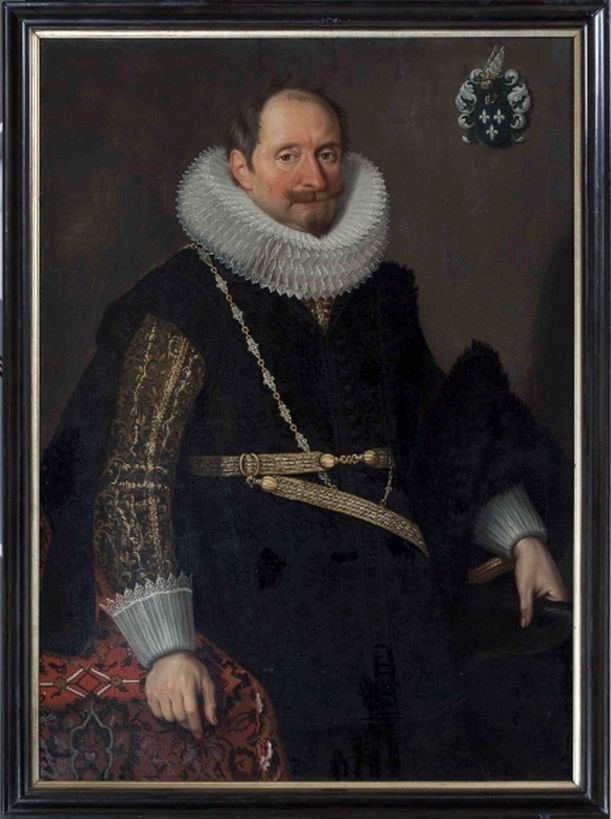
Eraert van Pipenpoy (anonymous, 1629)

Only after Van Camstra's death and two lawsuits, was Jarich assigned his birthplace Liauckamastate in 1618. He married Sjouck van Cammingha (d. 1620) around 1585, from whom two daughters emerged, Jel van Liauckama and her sister Trijn (b. 1592). By then, the state was in full glory again. Around 1616, Jel van Liauckama married Eraert van Pipenpoy at the castle, a wedding party that became known as the Pipenpoyse bruiloft (transl. Pipenpoy's wedding). The prosperity of the Liauckama family seemed to have been restored, as could be concluded from the inventory of the estate in 1619: 162 pear trees, 119 apple trees, 67 plum trees, 70 cherry trees, 47 hazelnut trees, 65 gooseberry bushes, 26 quinces, 13 grapevines, 1 palm hedge, 1 privet hedge, 30 Dutch rose bushes, 2 almond trees, 3 lime trees, 9 elm trees, 856 willow trees, 1009 alders, and 999 maple trees. Jarich died in 1642 at the age of 84. With him, the Liauckama family died out - at least from a patriarchal point of view - because his only brother Sicke (1562–1638), who was also born at Liauckamastate in 1562, had become a clergyman.

=== The last Liauckamas ===
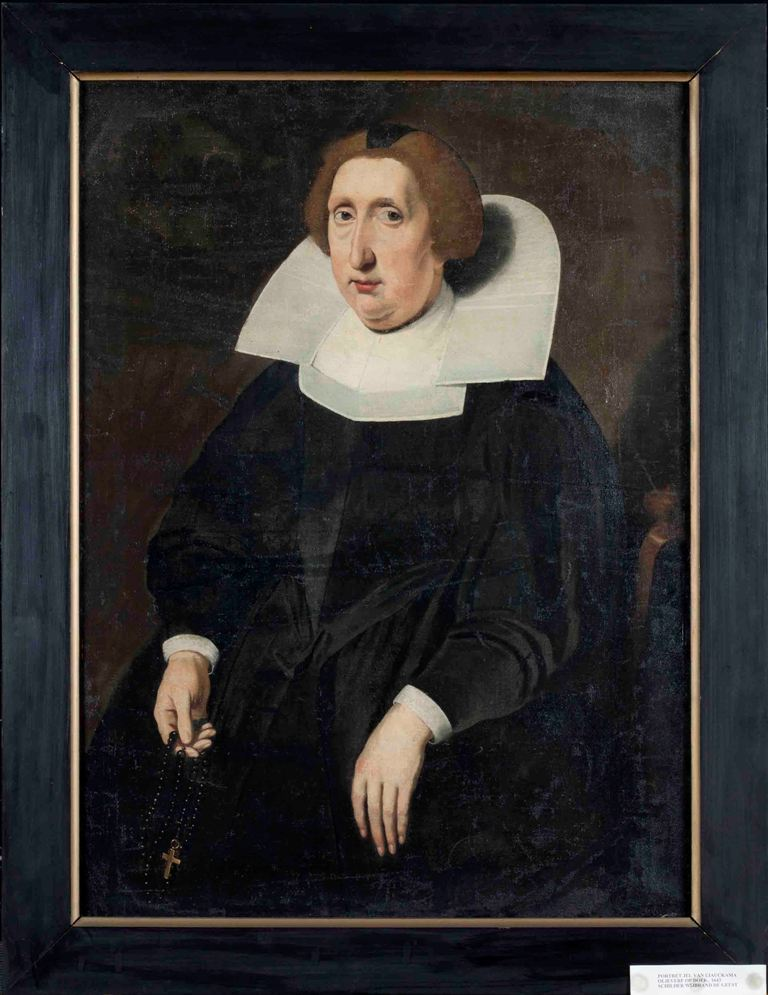
Jel van Liauckama (Wybrand de Geest, 1643)

Jel van Liauckama (b. 1585), now widow of Eraert van Pipenpoy, moved into the stins after her father's death, where she stayed until her death in 1650.

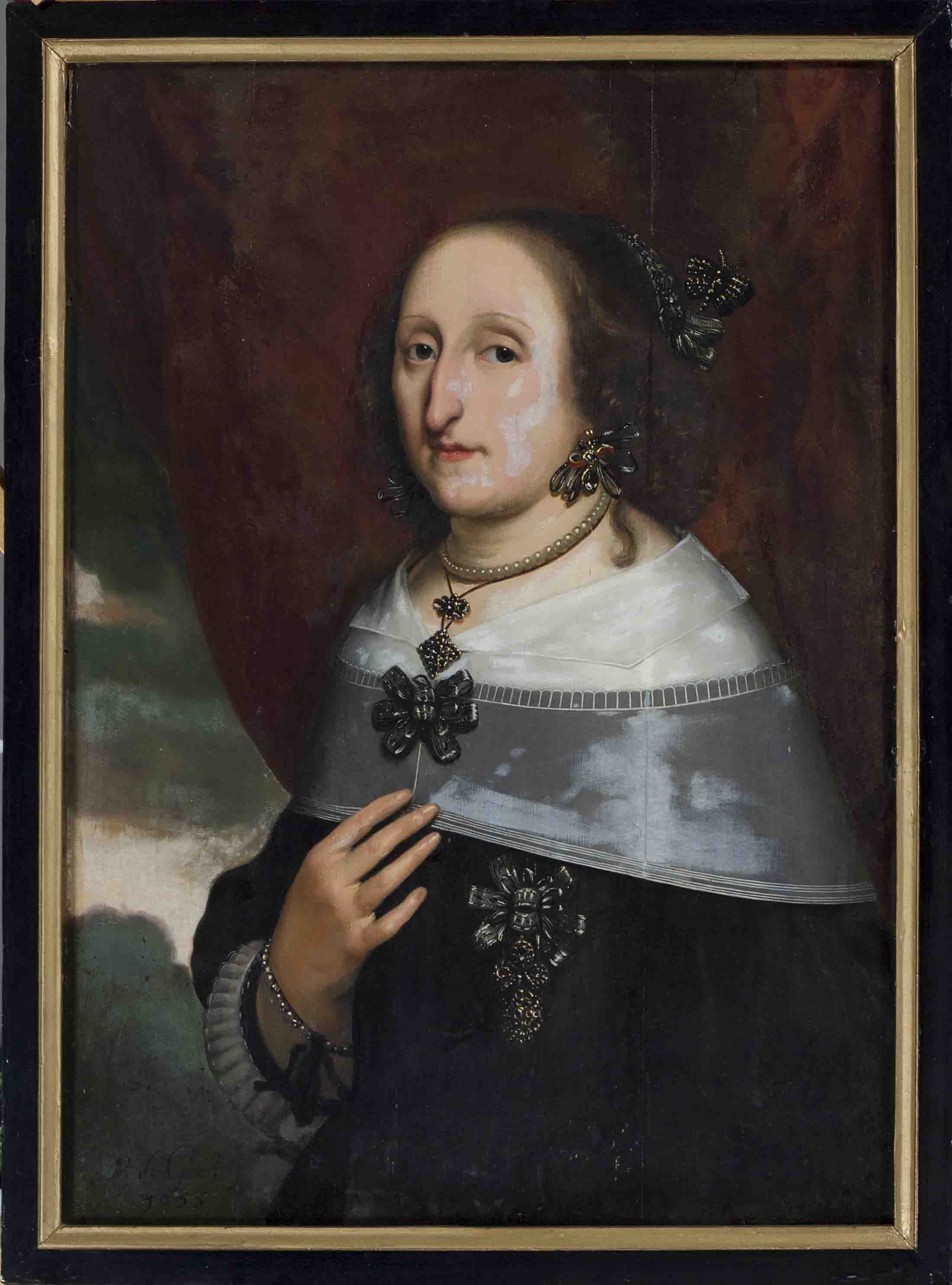
Sophia Anna van Pipenpoy (Wybrand de Geest, 1655)

Her only daughter Sophia Anna van Pipenpoy took over in 1652. She was married to Wytze van Cammingha (1629–1652) who was murdered that same year under peculiar circumstances. Her second marriage, to Johan Albert Count of Schellard, ended in divorce. Sophia Anna continued to live alone at the Liauckamastate for the rest of her life and died there childless in 1670.

Due to Pipenpoy's childless death, the state was inherited by her nephew Alexander Joseph van der Laen, son of Trijn van Liauckama. He moved into the castle in 1672 when he married Ael or Agatha van Hiddema and they lived there until 1702.

Because Van der Laen also died childless, the land was transferred to his brother Erard Theodoor and then to his cousin and namesake Alexander Joseph II who lived there around 1718. The latter married Maria Walburga van Coudenhoven in 1717.

The marriage of Alexander Joseph II produced three daughters, of whom the eldest, Maria Christina Clara van der Laen, took over the state and spent three marriages there with successively Matthias Victor Cannaert d'Hamale, Ernst van Ewsum and in 1750 with Bernard Allard van Hacfort. She divorced this man in 1754 because the latter allegedly abused her.

Liauckamastate was inherited by Maria Christina Clara's daughter Maria van Ewsum, who was married to Balthazar van Asbeck. They also died childless, which meant that the estate eventually ended up in the hands of their cousin, Jonkheer Ernst Jodocus Rudolphus van Grotenhuis van Onstein.

=== Demolition ===
In 1824, Van Grotenhuis decided to demolish the building in arrears to save himself further maintenance costs. For the purpose of inventory, carpenter Baas Schaaf mapped out the building and J. Amersfoordt wrote a report describing, among other things, the many paintings that were in the estate. Robidé van der Aa also visited the estate. He published his observations and those of others about the estate in Burgen en Kasteelen (1846). After the identified paintings had been taken to a safe place by Van Grotenhuis, the building was demolished.

The site was finally sold in 1838, thus ending the long family history on the estate of the former estate. The cleared site was used as a vegetable garden that was still being built between the old moats in the mid-nineteenth century. A farm was built on the site.

=== Recent history ===
The farm was bought by Jacob Wiebes Hanekuyk, a wealthy notary from Harlingen, who had the now dilapidated farm demolished around 1860 and a new farm built in its place. This was done a little further from the moat than where the old farm stood. In this way, the new house could be built next to the old one, which he used in the summer months. The farm remained in the hands of the Hanekuyk family for over a century.

In 1947, the farm was bought by Rients Bruinsma, leader of a resistance gang during the Second World War, known as the Knokploeg Sexbierum. His father and grandfather had been tenants of this farm since around 1845. Before he transferred the business to his son and retired, Rients Bruinsma had the house built on the former estate grounds. The foundations of the estate are still in the ground and the cellars have never been removed, but filled with rubble and earth. The well in the front garden of the house is said to have been built on the old well of the estate.

In 1979, the farm was bought by Mrs. Rietveld from Woerden. The lands had already been sold to three cousins of Rients Bruinsma who had farms in the vicinity. Mrs. Rietveld never lived on the rather dilapidated farm. She sold the building in 1986 to Gosse Bloem from Woerden, who restored the farm over the years and set up a restaurant, guesthouse, and conference centre. This closed in 2015; since then, the estate has not been open to the public.

== Terrain and buildings ==
Liauckamastate is an estate surrounded by a windbreak. Access to the grounds is still via the old gatehouse that dates from 1604. The moat around the plot is still largely present. On the grounds, there is a farm and a day laborer's house from the 19th century. The gatehouse, the farm, and the day laborer's house are designated rijksmonument.

=== Gatehouse ===
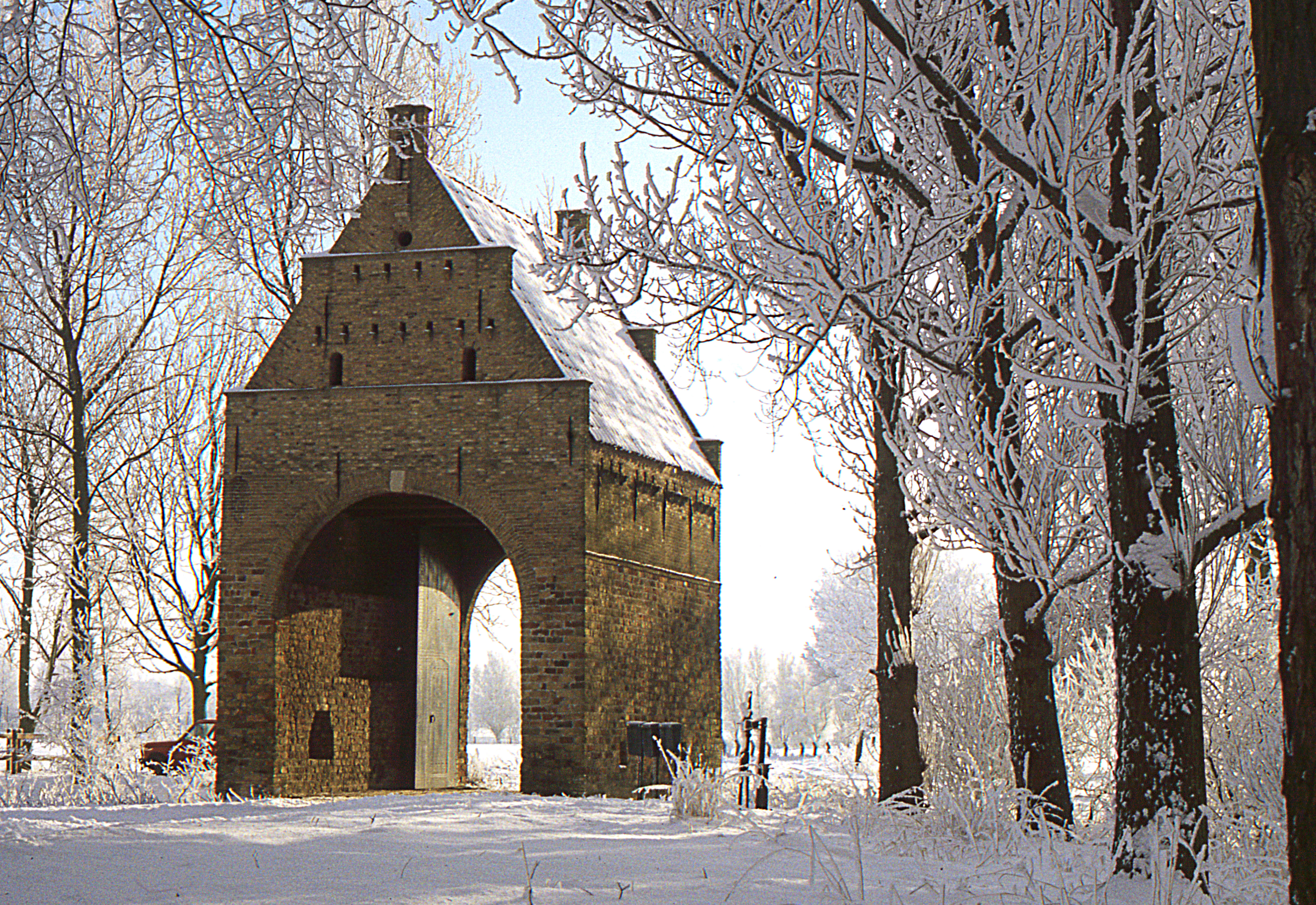
Gatehouse

The 17th-century gatehouse formed the entrance to the former castle, which was accessible via a bridge after the gate. It is built of bricks of varying sizes and has a keystone on the entrance side with a date of 1604. It has a tiled saddle roof between two gables, each with two water tables and a top pilaster.

The facade contains so-called gimmengaten, holes for pigeons: the residents of the estate kept pigeons for consumption and for the production of manure.

=== Farmhouse ===
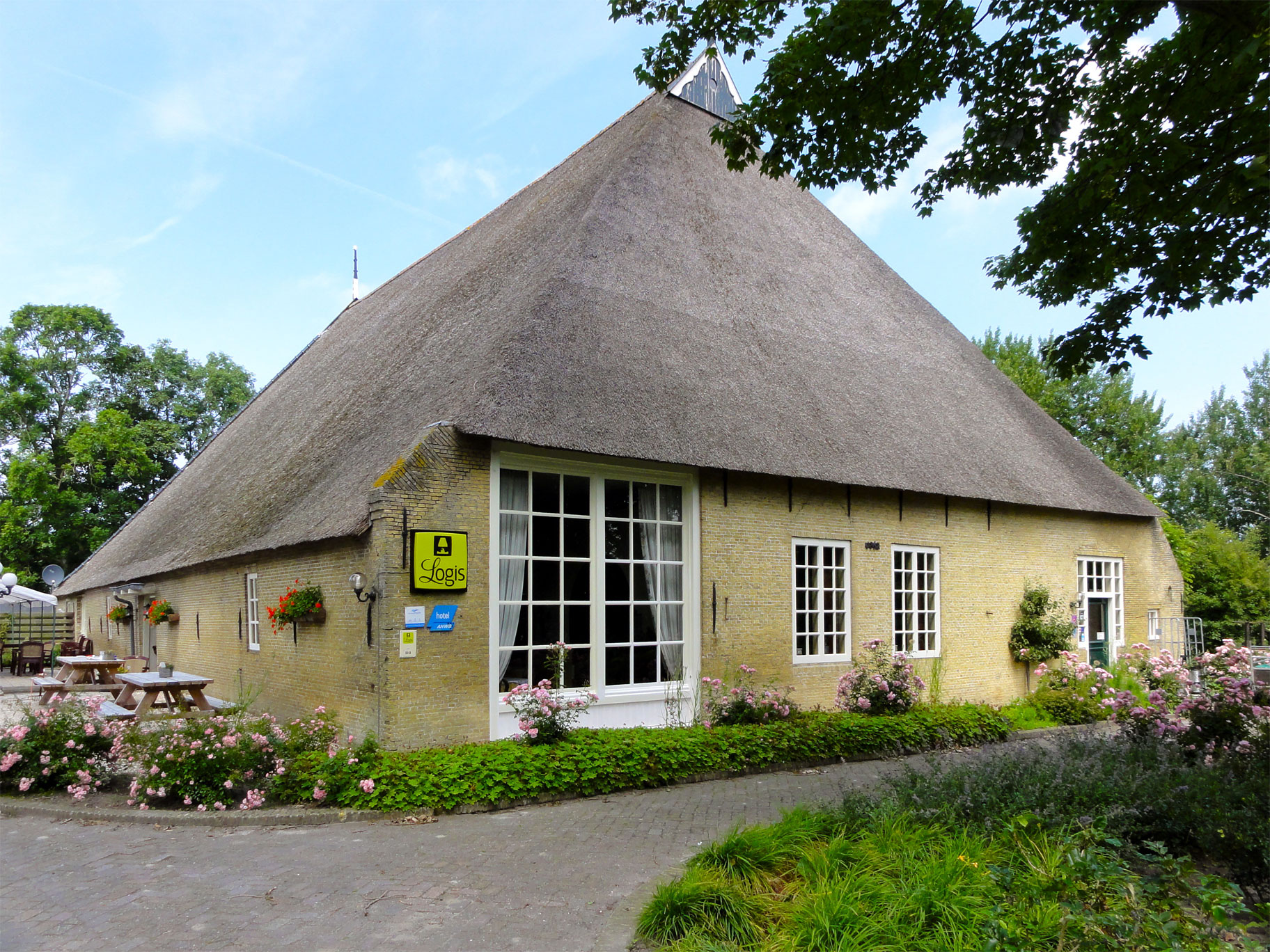
Farmhouse

The 19th-century head-neck-rump farm is built of yellow Frisian stone to the east of the former castle, but within the moats. The head and neck of the farm have saddle roofs of tiles. The front of the thatched hip roof of the back section is also covered with tiles. The building has uilenborden at the front and back. The head is partly basemented and has windows with varying pane divisions. The building also contains a simple brick boiler room with a saddle roof of tiles.

=== Day laborer's house ===
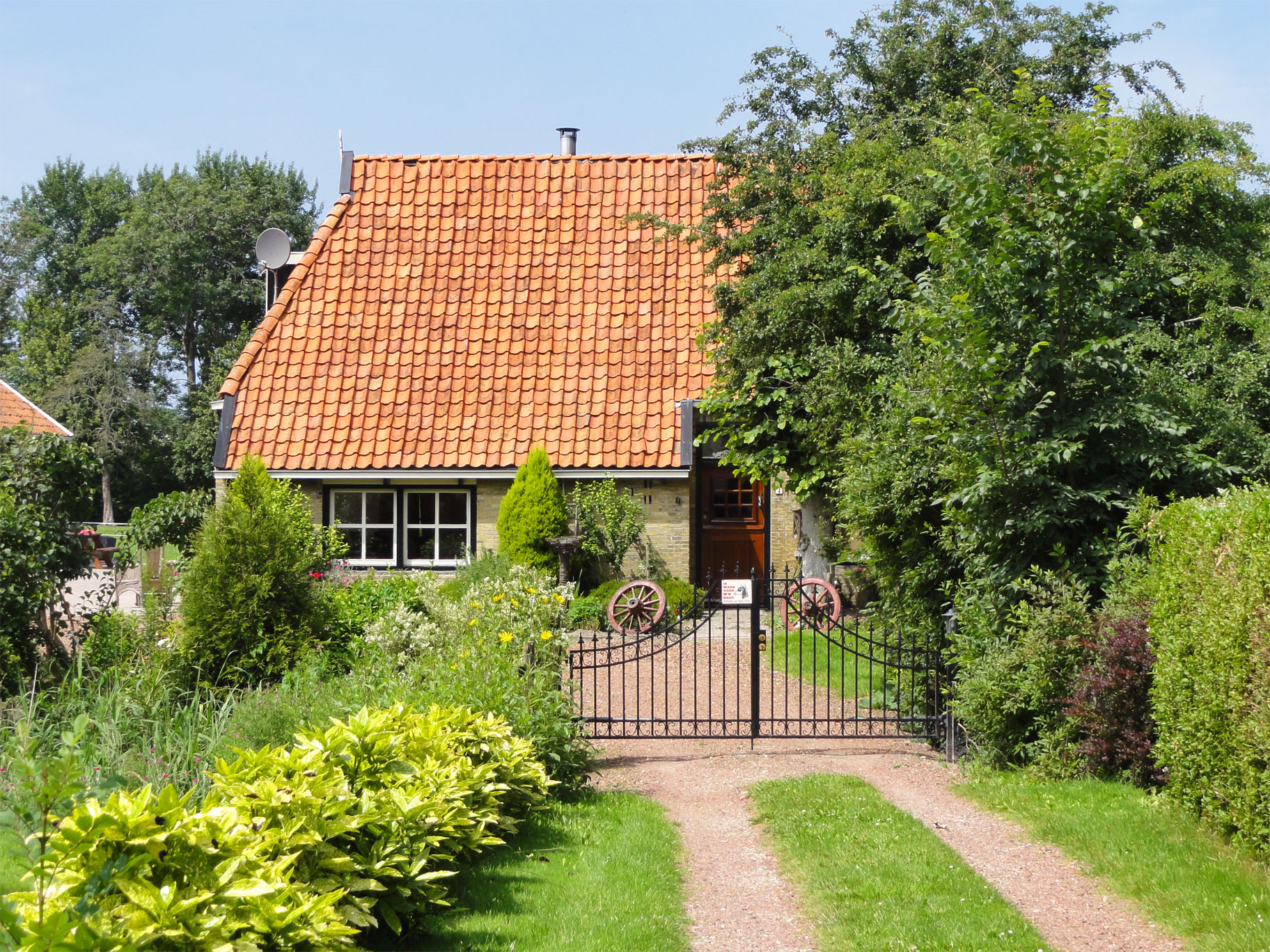
Day laborer's house

The no longer entirely original 19th-century day laborer's house, formerly also called a gardener's house, is located outside the moat north of the former castle. It is built of brick and has a pantile hip roof with a dormer and uilenborden.

=== Former castle ===
Although the origins of the estate probably date back to the 13th century, the castle had a medieval architectural style. Due to later additions, it had an irregular appearance, especially on the northeastern side: the castle had been damaged several times in battle, especially in 1498 and 1580, and had undergone large-scale repairs and renovations over time. The original heavy walls had been largely preserved until their demolition in 1824. When the castle came to the end of its existence, it was in a neglected state.

As with most Frisian stinsen, the building consisted of two wings at right angles to each other, with a staircase tower in the corner. The tower was located on the outside of the facade, which distinguished Liauckamastate from other stinsen. With further extensions, including a chapel at one point, the rectangle within the moat was filled in.

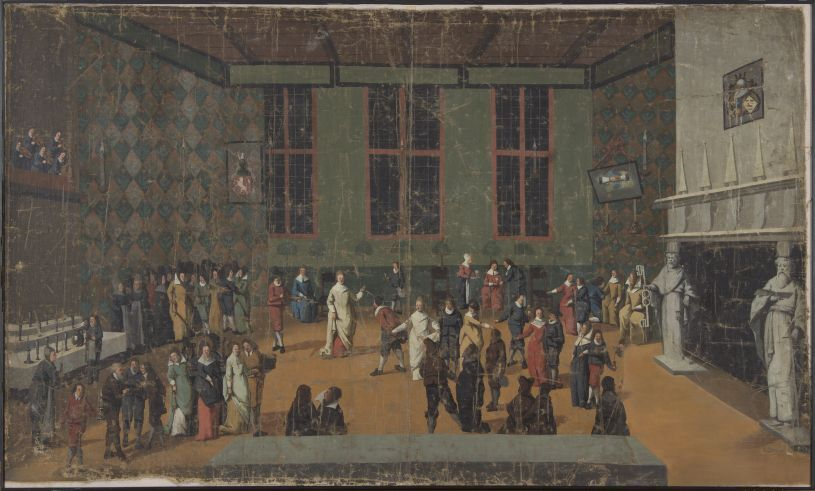
The great hall with the enormous fireplace as seen on one of the paintings of the Pipenpoyse bruiloft (anonymous, 1610)

A bridge connected the outer bailey to the actual house, where the entrance tower was built on the east side. Upon entering, the visitor was confronted with many coats of arms. The many rooms that the house was rich in were filled with paintings. Among them was in the great hall and in the room next to it the Pipenpoyse bruiloft, a series of paintings about the wedding of Erard van Pipenpoy and Jel van Liauckama. The great hall was fourteen meters wide and seven meters high. It was equipped with a mantelpiece supported by two enormous stone statues.

The southernmost room consisted of two oak box beds with large doors and carvings. In 1824, this room contained a portrait of a twenty-five-year-old Schelte van Liauckama (1521–1579) and a portrait of his second wife, Sjouck van Martena at the age of fifteen. In the Toren Sekreet there were three heavy beams with carvings, on which the year 1602 and the coat of arms of Camstra were placed. Presumably, the restoration was completed in that year, after the castle had been reduced to ashes in 1580.

The castle contained large cellars and a dungeon with a trapdoor, accessible directly from the entrance gate. In this dungeon was the murder pit, a space of about 3 meters deep that was also accessible via a hatch.

Carpenter's sketches of the castle in 1824

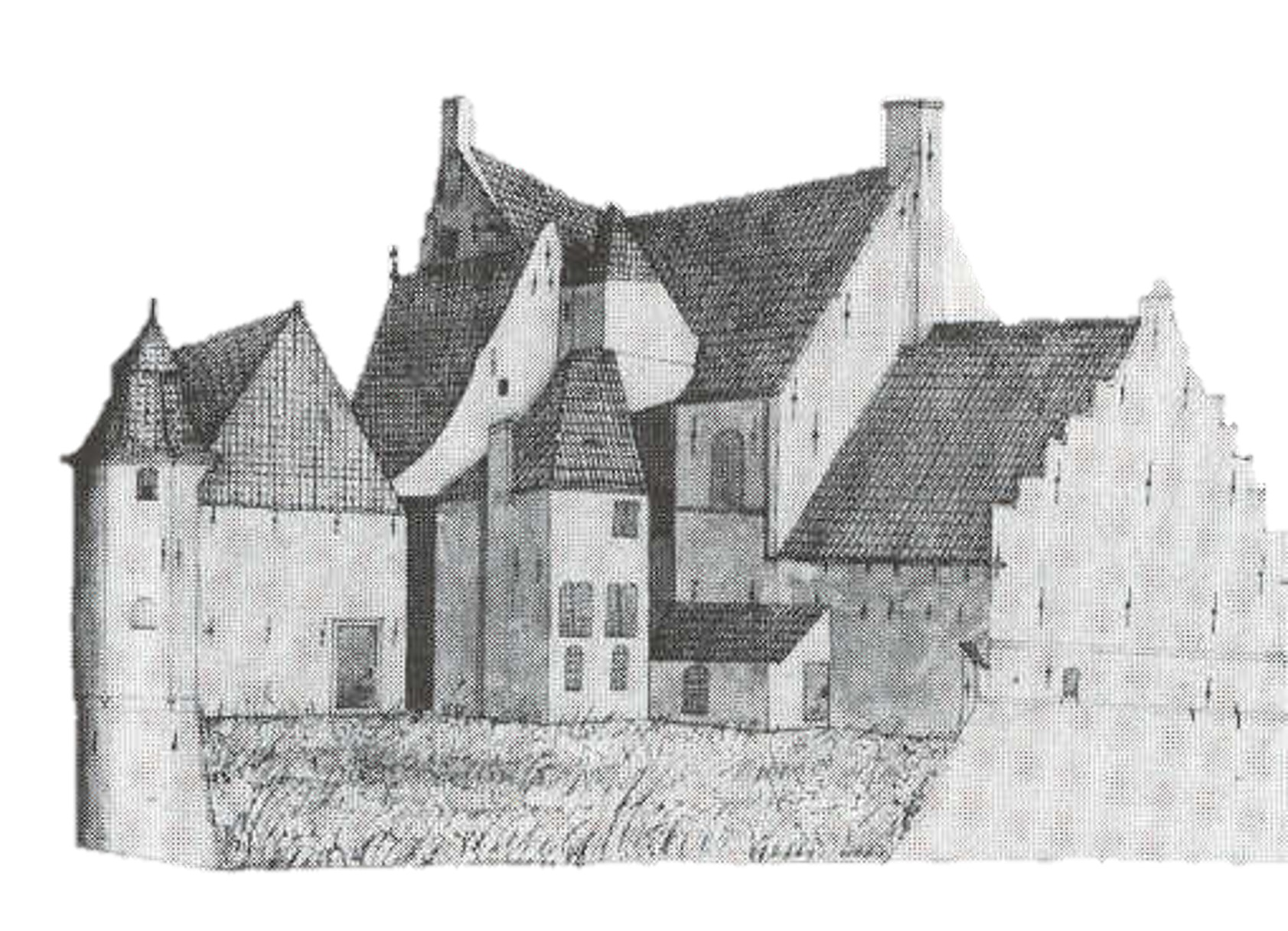
Northwest facade

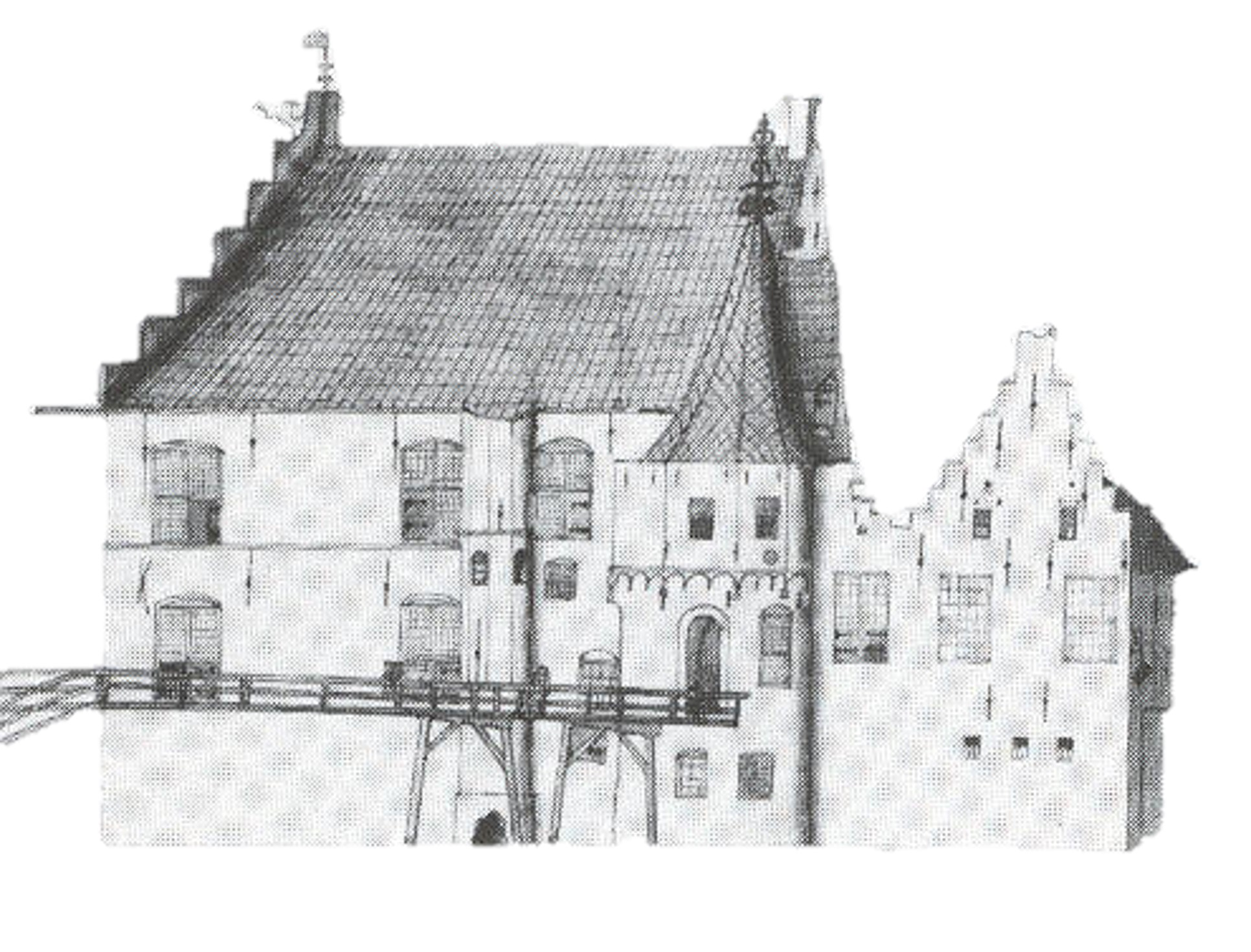
East facade

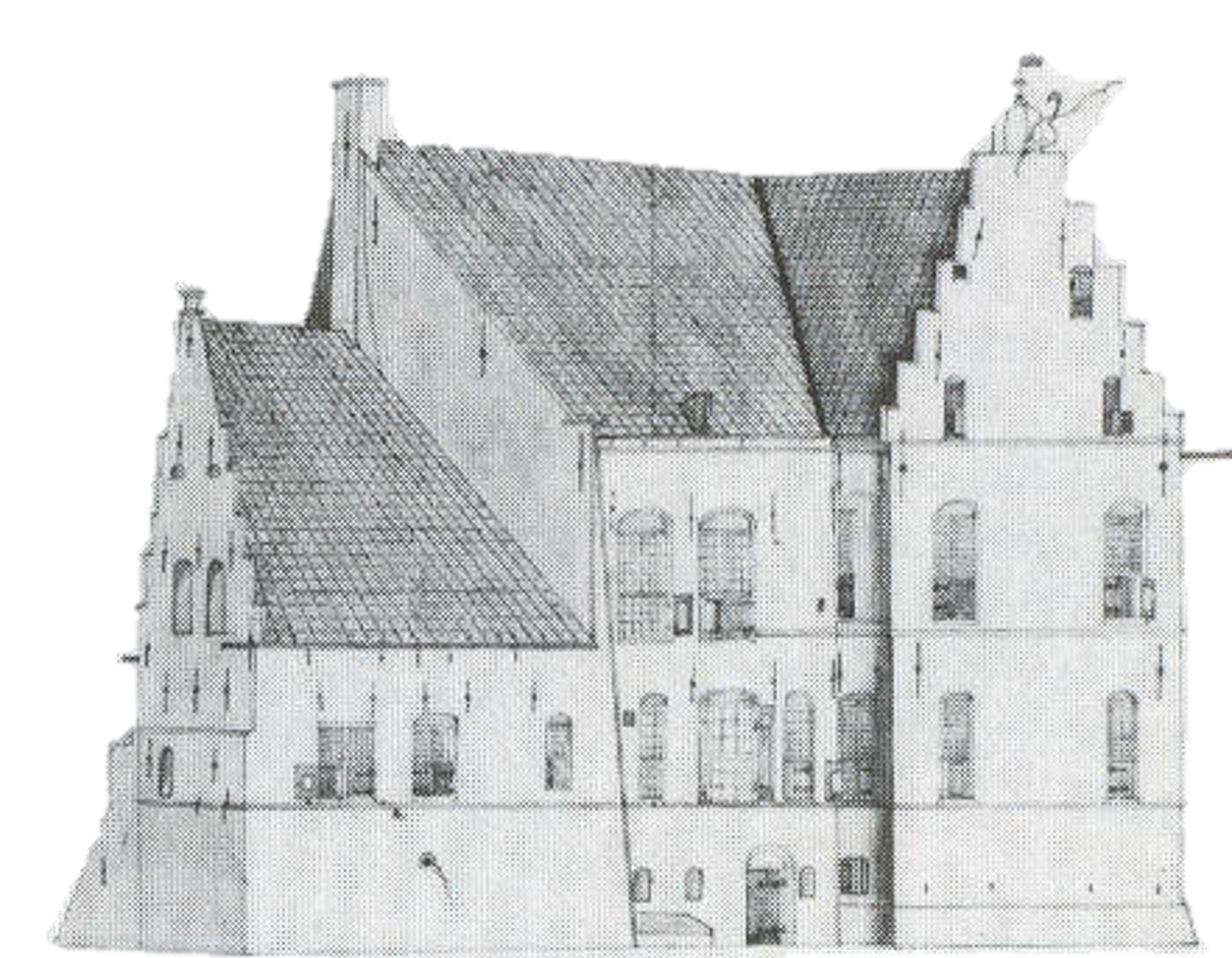
South facade

=== Underground passages ===
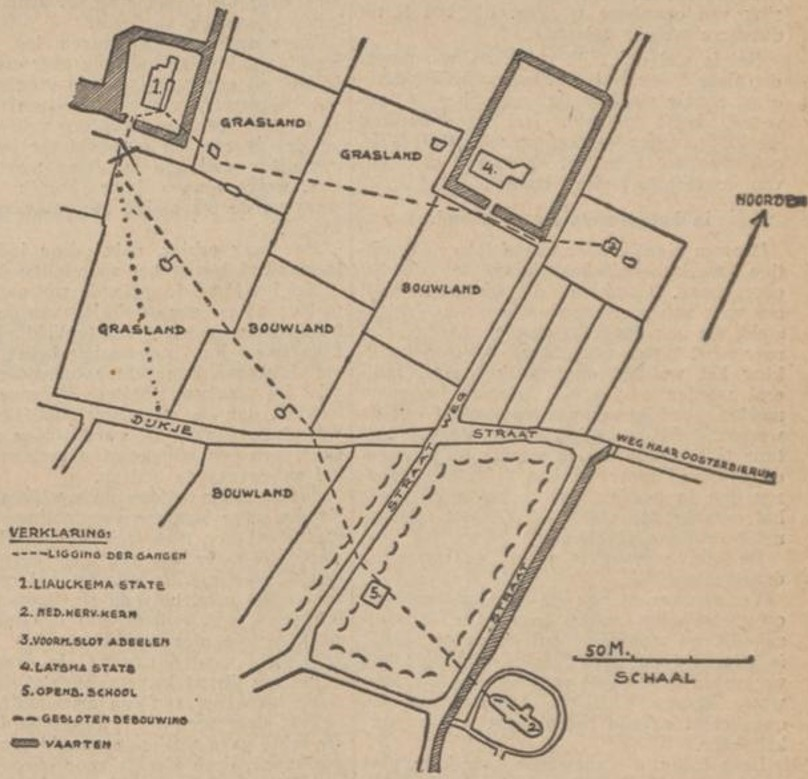
Suspected underground passages, 1938

Over the centuries, the castle's inhabitants have experienced threatening circumstances several times and had every reason to keep their castle in a defensible condition and to provide themselves with all means to get to safety. This may have included underground passages, to bring in reinforcements or food, or as an escape route.

Although the presence of these passages was suspected and research was done (one suspicion was that a passage led to the Latsma State, a neighbouring stins with which the Liauckamas had good ties), these passages were never found.

== Former residents ==
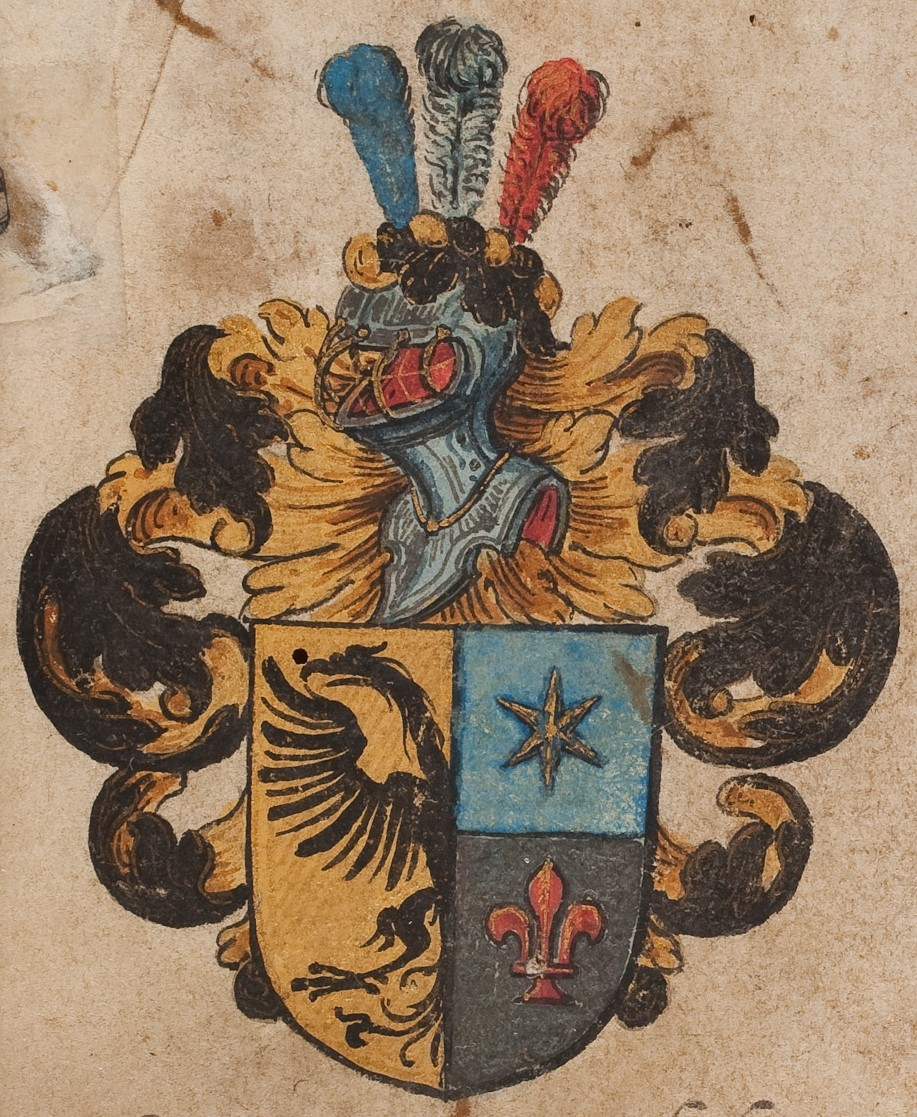
Liauckama family coat of arms (17th century)

The legendary 11th-century cousins Sicko Liauckama and Eelco Liauckama are the oldest known names of the Liauckama family, followed by abbot Eelco Liauckama. Whether they already lived on the estate at that time is unclear, since the oldest sign of the estate's existence is a 13th-century nucleus and the estate itself is not mentioned until the 14th century.

The respective residents were since then:

- 1398–1420: Schelte Liauckama
- 1420–1479: Schelte Liauckama (II) 'the old'
- 1479–1503: Schelte (III) Liauckama
- 1503–1535: Epo van Liauckama
- 1535–1574: Schelte van Liauckama
- 1579–1599: Sjouck van Liauckama
- 1599–1618: Tjallingh van Camstra
- 1618–1642: Jarich van Liauckema
- 1642–1650: Jel (Juliana) van Liauckama, married to Eraert van Pipenpoy, lord of Merchten
- 1650–1670: Sophia Anna van Pipenpoy, free lady of Merchten, van der Poort and others

Because Sophia Anna van Pipenpoy dies childless, the estate passes to a nephew:

- 1670–1702: Alexander Josephus van der Laen and Merchten, son of Trijn van Liauckama
- 1702–1718: Erard Theodoor van der Laen, brother of Alexander Josephus
- 1718–1724: Alexander Josephus van der Laen and Merchten II
- 1724–1787: Maria Christina baroness van der Laen van Liauckama
- 1787–1800: Maria Walburgia Electa van Ewsum

Maria Walburgia Electa van Ewsum dies childless and the estate passes to a nephew:

- 1800–1824: Jhr. Ernestus Jodocus Rudolphus van Grotenhuis van Onstein

== See also ==
- List of stins in Friesland
