= Siege of Groningen (1594) =

Siege during the Eighty Years' War

- Part of the Eighty Years' War and the Anglo-Spanish War
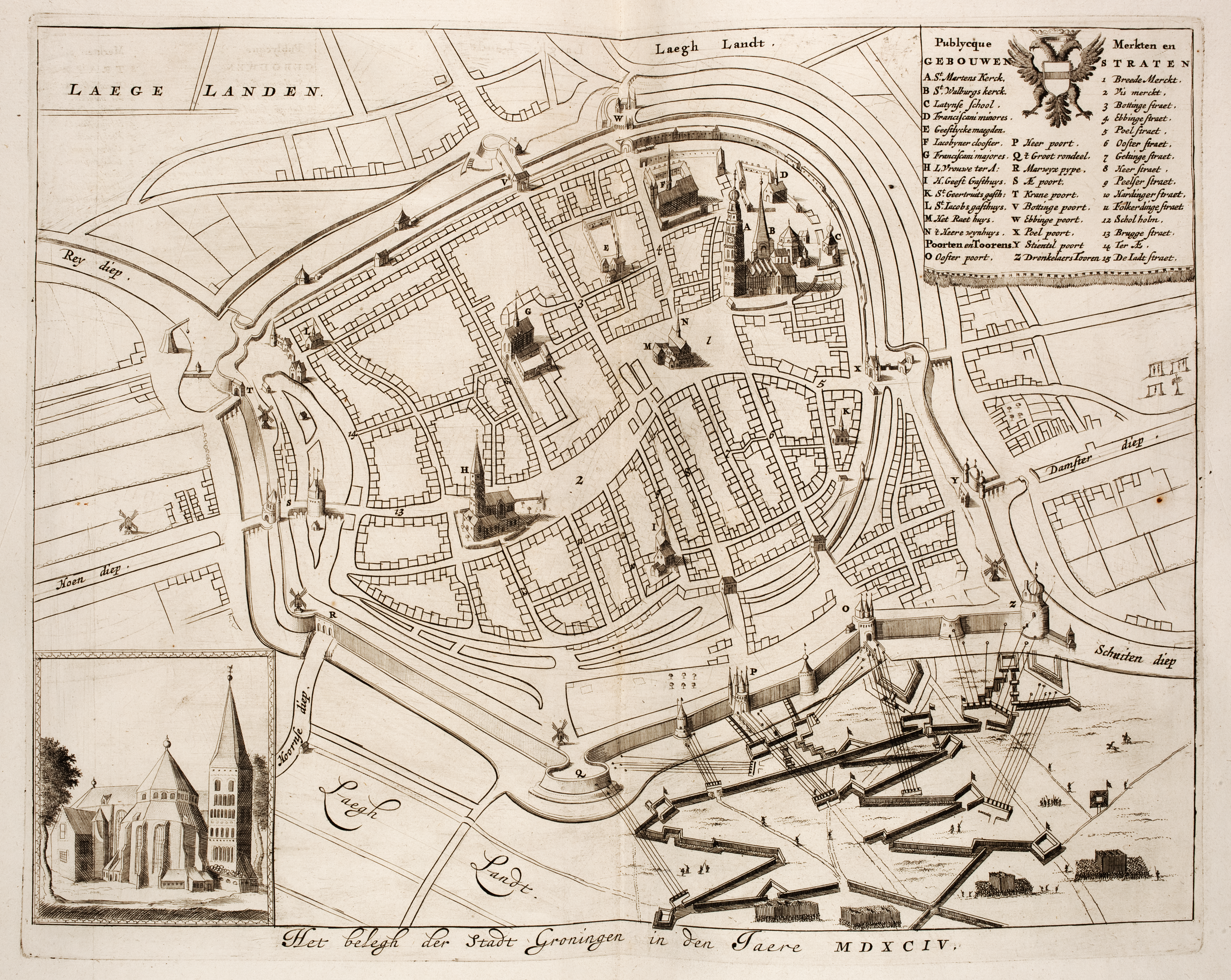
- Print by Hugo Grotius
Date	19 May – 22 July 1594
Location	Province of Groningen, Dutch Republic
Result	Dutch and English victory

Belligerents
Dutch Republic; Kingdom of England	(Spain) Spanish Empire

Commanders and leaders
Maurice of Orange; William Louis; Sir Francis Vere	Francisco Verdugo; Count of Fuentes; Jarich van Liauckema

Strength
10,000 soldiers; 2,000 cavalry	800 soldiers; 3,000 civilians; 5,000 relief forces

Casualties and losses
400 casualties	400 casualties

The siege of Groningen was a two-month siege which commenced on 19 May 1594, and which took place during the Eighty Years' War and the Anglo-Spanish War. The Spanish-held city of Groningen was besieged by a Dutch and English army led by Prince Maurice of Orange. The Spanish surrendered the city on 22 July, after a failed relief attempt by the Count of Fuentes.

In a period of more than five years before Groningen fell, all the key strategic positions which led to or connected the city in vital ways were taken one by one. The capture was decisive for the Dutch Republic as the last of the Spanish forces had been pushed out of the Northern provinces ending their domination. The city was then merged with the surrounding district and the transition to the new Protestant regime was followed by the expulsion of all property of the Roman Catholics as well as a complete ban on Catholicism.

== Background ==
At the end of the 15th century, Groningen had a strong influence on the surrounding lands; the nearby province of Friesland was administered from the city. During the early stages of the Dutch revolt against Spain, Groningen had declared for the Union of Utrecht, but the Stadtholder, George de Lalaing, Count of Rennenberg, became a turncoat and sided with Spain. Renneberg sold the place for 10,000 crowns, arrested the principal citizens, and opened the gates to the Spaniards on 3 March 1580. For the Republic a great danger therefore arose; the region of Friesland and Ommelanden had fully supported the uprising, but the strategic location of Groningen seriously affected the position of the Republic in the north.

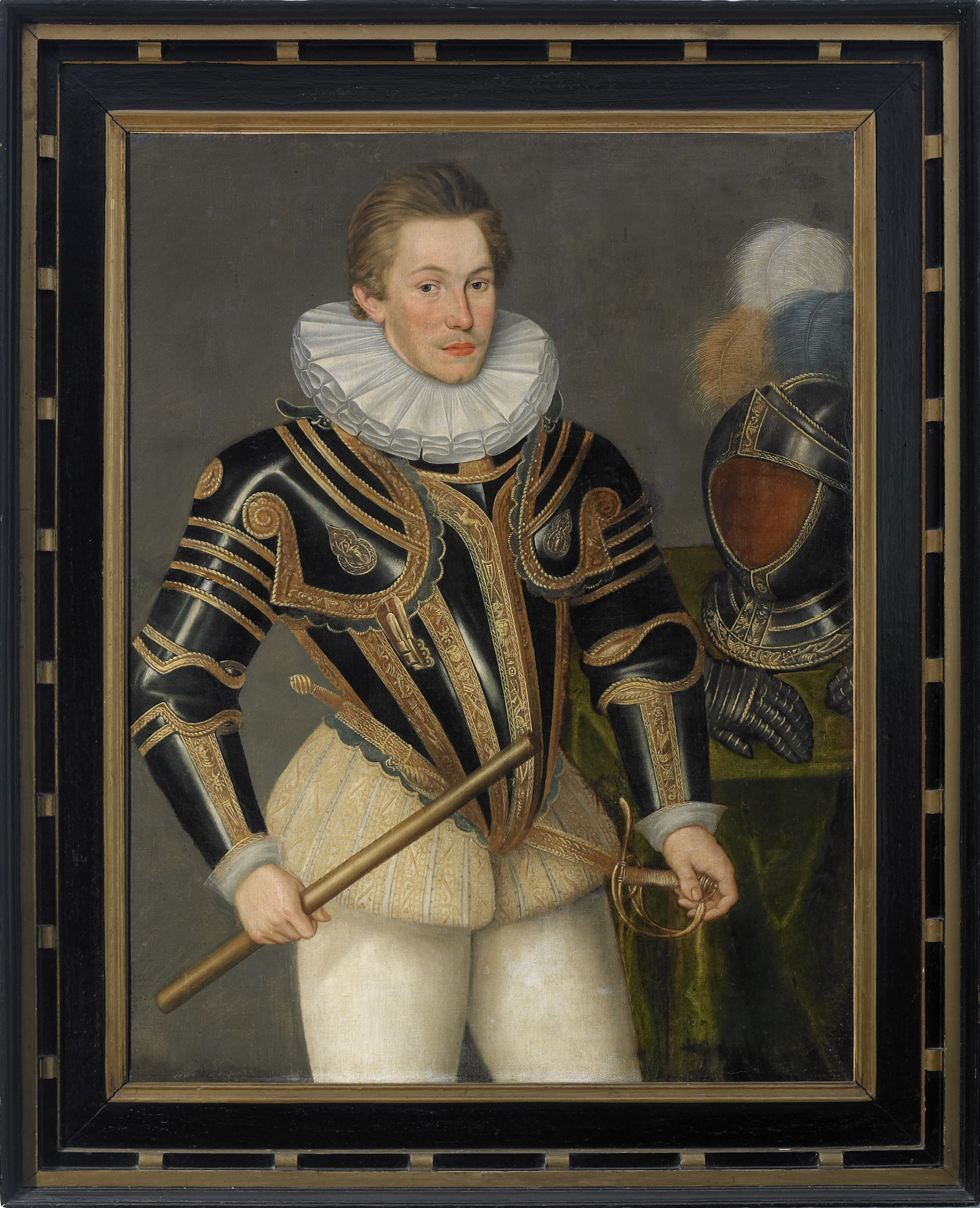
Maurice of Orange by Daniël van den Queborn

The Republic however, held off from besieging Groningen as the city was itself heavily fortified and assumed the garrison was large enough to hold out for a relief. Detailed negotiations between the city government and the States-General were undertaken to achieve a solution. Pensionary Johan van Oldebarneveldt was thereby prepared to agree to a solution where Groningen would be recognized as a free city under the formal protection of the Duke of Brunswick and even proposed some religious freedom to Catholics. The talks broke down as the military, in particular the Dutch commander in the region William Louis did not want the Duke of Brunswick as protector, and that Groningen again could easily turn into a repeat of Rennenberg's betrayal.

In preparation for the siege of Groningen, William Louis carefully captured the many sconces that the Spanish troops held, starting in 1589 at the Battle of Zoutkamp, to weaken their hold on the city.

During Maurice's campaign of 1591 all plans were made to proceed for a potential siege of Groningen. Nearly half of the army were English and Scots; twelve English and ten Scots companies were present in this campaign under the command of Sir Francis Vere. This was soon reinforced by another eight companies composing of 3,000 to 4,000 men which had been granted (reluctantly) by Queen Elizabeth I during a recruitment campaign.

The initial stages of the campaign saw the Capture of Delfzijl; a main transit port for Groningen. The following year, when the Spanish forces were committed in France to halt the collapse of the Catholic League there; Dutch and English forces under Maurice and Francis Vere went on the offensive. Steenwijk and Coevorden were both taken by the Dutch and English. Maurice then ordered William Louis with a detached force to capture the high peat bogs east of Groningen along with the towns of Winschoten and Slochteren, making sure the city was cut off from the German states. Maurice then seized Geertruidenberg, only to find that a large Spanish army in the south of the Republic ensured his army could not leave that area. William Louis captured a strategic sand hill fort under construction completely cutting off Groningen from its hinterland. Francisco Verdugo, the Spanish commander in the South, hearing of the forts loss attempted to march against it, but being late in the year then decided against it. Verdugo then besieged Coevorden instead during the autumn of 1593 but Maurice marched to its relief during the spring of 1594. Verdugo raised the siege on 6 May, and the Spaniards retreated without venturing into an engagement.

After relief of Coevorden, the Dutch and English troops left there on 19 May, and marched to Groningen. The Spanish army had been riddled with mutinies and desertions and the further loss of Wedde through betrayal meant that Groningen was now an easy target for the Anglo-Dutch.

== Siege ==
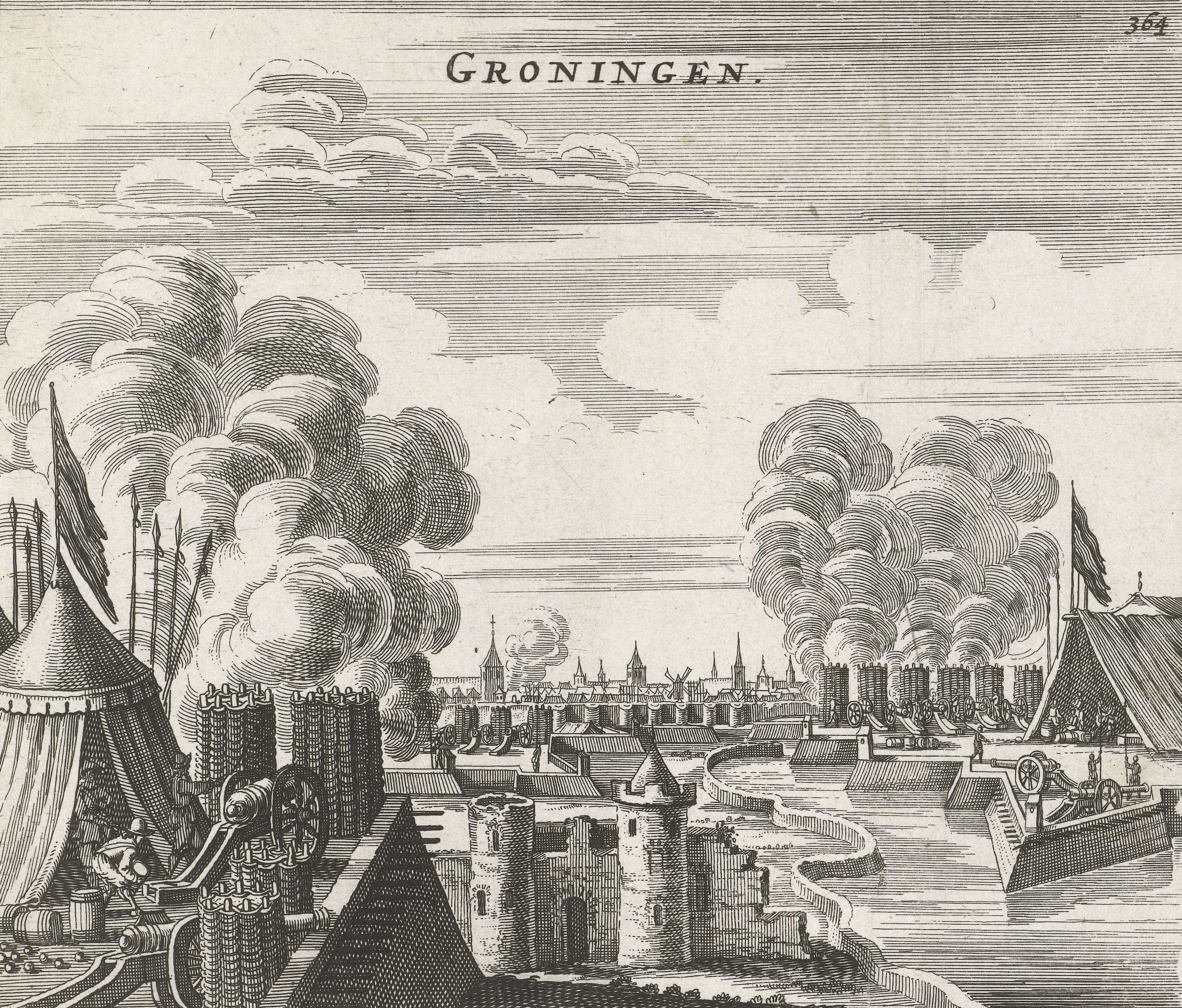
Siege of Groningen 1594 by Jan Janssonius

On 22 May, the Anglo-Dutch force had arrived and began a blockade of the town. The plan determined upon was to open trenches and attack the south side of the city. Groningen beforehand, despite being a large town, was only garrisoned by 400 Germans & Catholic Frisians under Mayor Alberto Jarges. The walls of the city were well supplied with artillery, and as Maurice approached the city reinforcements of 600 Spanish and Flemish troops under Commander Jarich van Liauckema, Verdugo's lieutenant, entered the town by the Poelepoort which brought the garrison up to near 1,000. The city however had divided loyalties; the poor were deeply attached to the Catholic faith, but the burghers were concerned about the economy and therefore saw greater advantage with the republic.

Maurice's headquarters was established in the village of Haren, from this position the approaches were made towards several strong points of the enceinte. Five siege guns were planted against the Drenkelaar tower, ten against the ravelin of the Oosterpoort, twelve against the Heerepoort, six against the Pas Dam, and three against the bastion at the southern angle. Maurice ordered to stem the water that flowed adjacent with the land – small canals were built to carry his siege guns, and to take the supplies from the surrounding country. Few of the surrounding small sconces were left guarded by the Spanish, some were already abandoned and the only bastion at Aduarderzijl had to be taken by storm by troops under William Louis. With this capture the army could also be provided by supplies from Friesland. Vere, with his English contingent, worked side by side in the trenches with the regiments of Friesland and Zeeland. When the guns opened fire there was a steady and continuous reply from the ramparts, and although the Drenkelaar was partially destroyed, and much damage was done to the walls and gates, the defence proved to be stubborn.

A crisis then arose in late May, when Queen Elizabeth ordered the return of her English troops with the need to send them to France because of the Spanish threat on Brest. Vere acquiesced and asked the Dutch to replace the English troops in the garrisons at Ostend, Flushing, and Briel in order to prevent a collapse of the campaign. This was done and the siege continued.

On 3 June, the guns were placed in position opposite the Oosterpoort and Vere had lodged his men within the counterscarp and along the moat, where they were then exposed to gunfire. Meanwhile, the besiegers were hampered by rain, and a large sortie from the city was attempted on the Heerepoort, where the English were surprised with serious loss. Captain Wrey, standing at the head of the trench, was shot dead, and several men were killed and wounded before the Spanish were repelled.

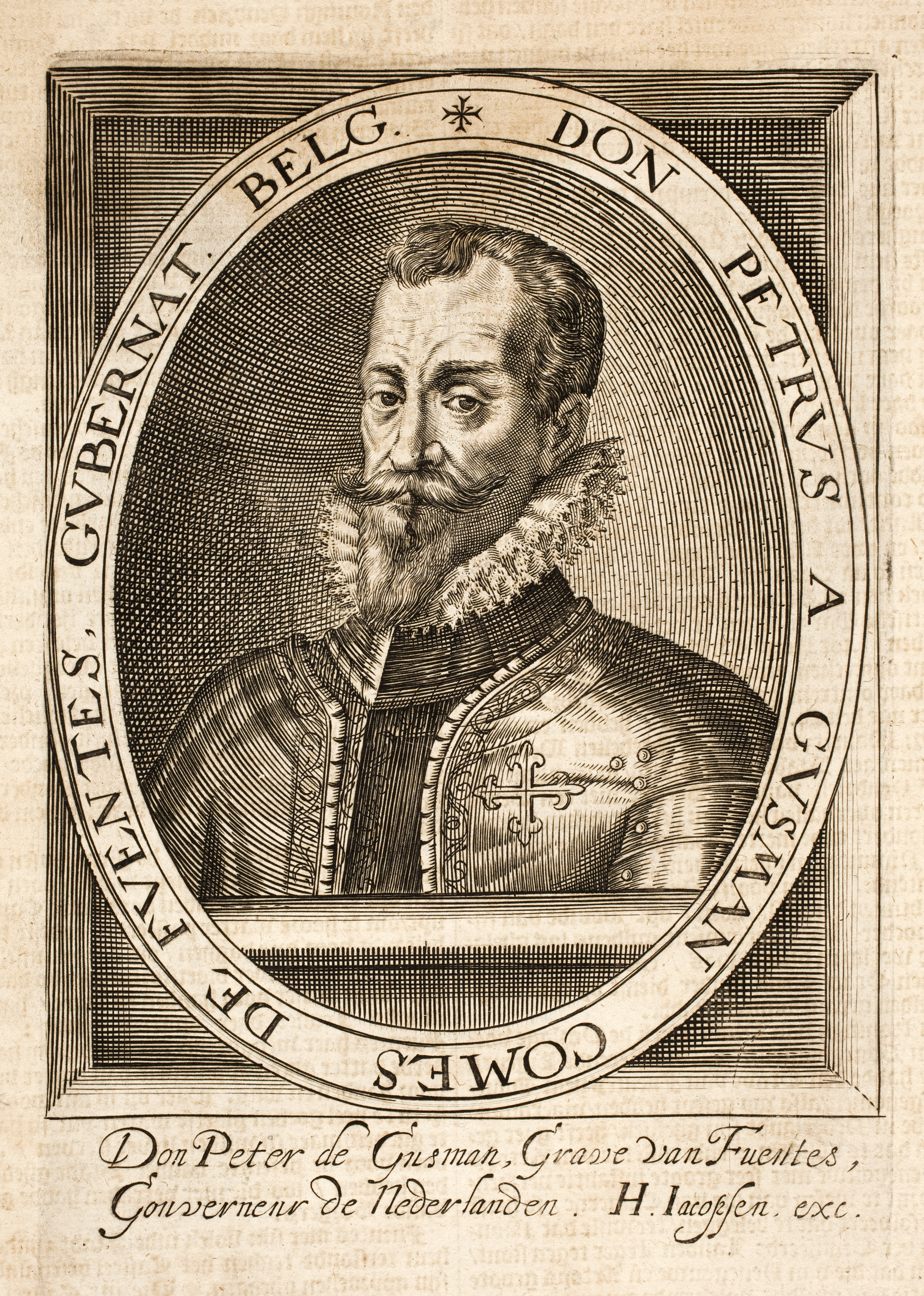
Pedro de Acevedo, Count of Fuentes, by Emanuel van Meteren

While some in the Anglo-Dutch camp were expecting a long siege, the vast majority were expecting a short fight, in the belief that the city wanted to become part of the Republic. The Groningen elite however had firmly said no to negotiate a treaty with Maurice as they had counted on a relief by troops from the governor Ernst of Austria. He ordered Pedro, Count of Fuentes, to relieve the city and ordered the garrison not to enter into any negotiations on pain of death. In the meantime with this potential news the Spanish garrison fired furiously hoping to weaken the besiegers defences but it only managed to churn up the ground. Fuentes struggled to bring together his army of less than 5,000 men however because of mutiny in its ranks as well as Dutch cavalry harassing on its march. Eventually with disease, desertion, and casualties – the attempted relief was abandoned.

The Oosterpoort by mid-June became the main focus of the besiegers cannon fire and the Dutch and English engineers dug mines under the strong ravelin in front of the bastion. News of this soon spread through the city and many within wanted to begin negotiations to capitulate. The town and the besiegers began negotiations but fighting broke out among the citizenry – Alberto Jarges and Liauckema ordered to fight on as a reminder that all would be executed if the Spanish did relieve the city. Mining continued at the Oosterpoort, and on 18 June, an English captain Sir Edward Brooke was killed – Francis Vere's younger brother Horace Vere received his first company and was promoted to captain as Brooke's replacement. Not long after Maurice and Vere were making a reconnaissance close to the walls, under a large buckler, when a shot struck it, and they were both hurled to the ground but with only minor injuries.

On 5 July, the mine was complete, and explosives were brought into the tunnels during the night, which were then detonated. The huge explosions for the besiegers worked perfectly and were witnessed by both besieger and besieged alike. Soon after the dust had cleared, the battered bastions were then assaulted. In fierce hand to hand combat the besiegers, in which many Scots distinguished themselves, carried the position before dawn. Losses were heavy amongst the attackers with 150 casualties – but they inflicted a loss of 200 men on the garrison.

The capture of this key position was all too much for the garrison – with no hope of relief, surrender was the only option. A few days afterwards Liauckema and the principal citizens came into Maurice's headquarters, and terms of surrender were agreed upon.

== Aftermath ==
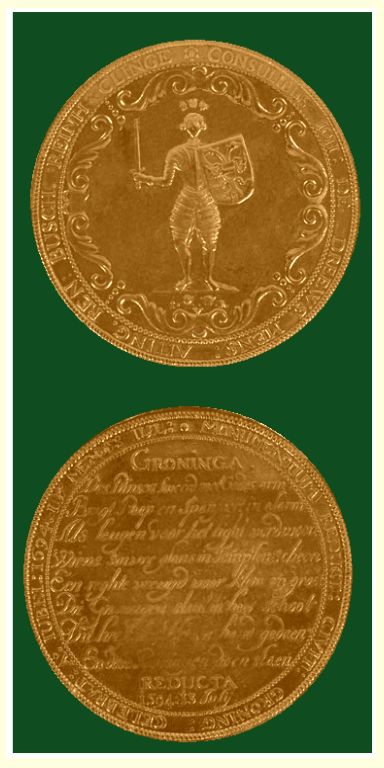
A golden coin celebrating the capture of Groningen and the Restoration of the Seven Provinces

After the guns had fallen silent the city gained a favourable settlement – with the capitulation, Groningen and its citizenry confirmed in all its ancient rights. The garrison was to march out, and the town was to receive magistrates appointed by William Louis, as Stadtholder of Friesland. Nearly 400 Spanish troops and 300 other defenders were killed or wounded. A request for at least one Catholic church for worship to be allowed to be kept was rejected. In Groningen the treaty became known as the "Treaty of Reduction" and the city was admitted as a province into the union. In religious terms however aspects were radically changed, thus altering the agreements van Oldenbarnevelt had allowed before the siege. After the capitulation all monks and priests departed, many of whom had fled to the city from the surrounding district, together with the survivors of the army of occupation in the southern Netherlands. The city council was emptied of Catholics, and Catholic worship was from then on prohibited in the city.

Maurice with his principal officers, including William Louis and Francis Vere, made a triumphant entry into Groningen on 15 July. Maurice then returned, by way of Amsterdam, to a triumphant entry into The Hague where he was feted amidst great rejoicing.

For the Republic the capture of Groningen was an important victory. The Spanish army had been all but pushed out of the Northern provinces and the restoration of the seven provinces was then complete. Verdugo having been defeated yet again was thus recalled from Friesland by Archduke Ernest of Austria and his position was taken over by Herman van den Bergh.

The fall of Groningen also changed the balance of forces in the German county of East Friesland, where the Lutheran Count of East Frisia, Edzard II, was opposed by the Calvinist forces in Emden. The States-General now laid a garrison in Emden, forcing the Count to recognise them diplomatically in the Treaty of Delfzijl of 1595. Maurice and his army then paused for a while before launching a campaign in the North East of the Rhine area to retake the cities of Twente, such as Enschede, Oldenzaal, and Lingen. This campaign which took place the following year however proved a failure with the siege of Groenlo.

A medal was presented to the newly-elected Dutch city council, the members of the State Assembly, and the officers involved in the capture of Groningen. Groningen remained united with Ommelanden but did not become a province until 1795.
