= Battle of Boksum =

1586 battle

Coordinates: 53.1835°N 5.7315°E

The Battle of Boksum (17 January 1586) was fought during the Eighty Years' War between a Spanish and a Dutch rebel army (largely composed of Frisians) commanded by Steen Maltesen Sehested, a Danish officer.

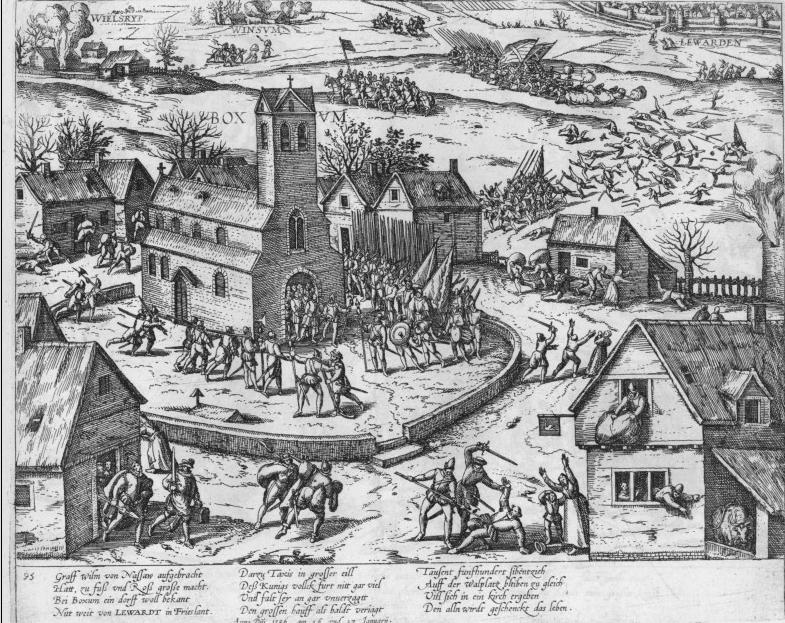
Battle of Boksum in Friesland, 1586

On 13 January 1586 a Spanish army of about 3,000 soldiers and 700 horsemen invaded Frisia. In the absence of William Louis, Count of Nassau-Dillenburg, a nephew of William of Orange and the stadtholder of Frisia, the Spanish commander Francisco Verdugo, who was based in Groningen, hoped to reclaim the territory for Spain. Because of freezing weather, the Frisian lakes were no obstacles to the invasion and the Spanish artillery could move easily over the hard roads. After looting part of Frisia, Verdugo decided to retreat because thawing weather threatened to cut him off from his base in Groningen. In the meantime, the Frisians gathered an army with a core of professional soldiers and a larger number of Frisian volunteers. Maltesen decided to entrench at the village of Boksum. Spanish cavalry coming out of the fog surprised the rebel force in their half-finished entrenchments on the morning of 17 January. The rebels panicked and their army disintegrated. The total number of deaths of this battle is estimated to have been around 1,000. Spanish losses were very low. Because the rising temperatures turned the roads into swamps, the Spanish force eventually left all their loot and some of their heavy arms behind when they retreated to their base in Groningen.
