= Hellburner =

Specialised, explosive fireships used during the Siege Of Antwerp (1584–1585)

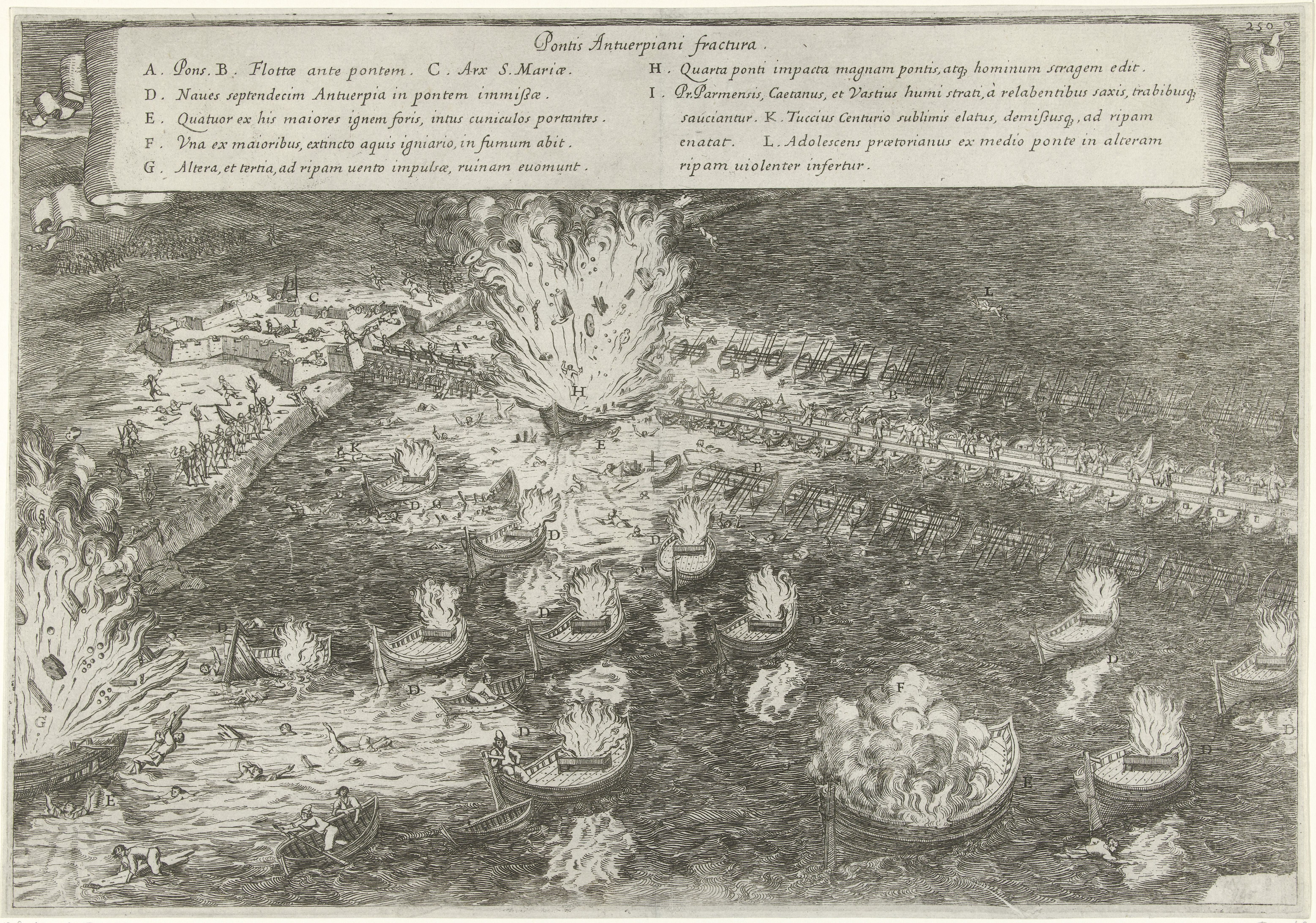
Hellburners at Antwerp by Famiano Strada

Hellburners (Dutch: hellebranders), also known as explosion ships or Antwerp fire, were a pair of specialised explosive fireships built and fielded by the defending Dutch rebels in the Fall of Antwerp (1584–1585), part of the Eighty Years' War against the Habsburgs. The hellburners functioned as extremely powerful floating bombs and did immense damage to the Spanish besiegers, leaving a lasting impression on the Spanish sailors as to the fireship capabilities of their enemies. Hellburners have been described as an early form of weapons of mass destruction.

== First use against Antwerp ship bridge ==
The hellburners were constructed by the Italian engineer Federigo Giambelli, who had been hired and subsidised by Elizabeth I of England, unofficially supporting the rebels, to assist the city. In the winter of 1585, Antwerp was besieged by the army of Alexander Farnese, the commander of the Habsburg forces in the Spanish Netherlands, who had constructed a ship bridge over the River Scheldt near Kalloo between Antwerp and the sea, to starve the population by blockade; it had been completed on 25 February. To supply the city it was imperative to destroy the ship bridge.

Giambelli first proposed to use three medium-sized merchantmen, the Oranje, Post and Gulden Leeuw, but this was refused, only two smaller vessels being made available: the Fortuyn ("Fortune") and Hoop ("Hope") of about seventy tons. The innovative part of the project consisted in the Hoop employing a fuse consisting of a combined clockwork and flintlock mechanism provided by an Antwerp watchmaker, Bory; the Fortuyn used a delayed fuse mechanism.

To ensure destruction, very large charges were used. To intensify and channel the explosion, an oblong "fire chamber" was constructed on each ship, 1 metre in diameter. The bay was fitted with a brick floor, 30 centimetres thick and 5 metres wide; the walls of the chamber were 1.5 metres thick; the roof consisted of old tombstones, stacked vertically and sealed with lead. The chambers with a length of 12 metres were each filled with a charge of about 3,200 kilograms (7,000 lb) of high-quality corned gunpowder. On top of the chambers a mixture of rocks and iron shards and other objects was placed, again covered in slabs; the spaces next to the chambers were likewise filled. The whole was covered with a conventional wooden deck.

The two fireships were successfully used in the night of 4–5 April 1585. Giambelli had prepared 32 normal fireships to be first launched in several waves to deceive the Spaniards. In fact, the commander supervising the operation, Vice-Admiral Jacob Jacobsen, set all ships on their course in quick succession, from fort Boerenschans, the hellburners last. The current and ebb tide carried the ships towards the bridge. The decks of the hellburners were piled with wood and small charges with slow fuses, which gave the impression that they were conventional fireships, causing the Spanish troops to try to extinguish the fire.

The Fortuyn ran ashore on the west river bank some distance from the bridge and its, probably only partial, explosion did little damage to the Spanish forces, but the Hoop drifted along the same bank between the river shore and a protective row of anchored ships forming a raft in front of the main bridge and touched the latter near the junction of the fixed wooden shore structure and the attached ships. When the time bomb aboard the Hoop exploded, about eight hundred troops were killed, the sconce Santa Maria was devastated, and the ship bridge was ripped apart over a distance of 60 metres; the blast was heard in an 80-kilometer radius. Farnese was wounded in the explosion. However, the damage to the bridge was quickly repaired, and a rebel relief fleet failed to exploit the opportunity to break through, because it was at first mistakenly thought the attempt at the bridge had been unsuccessful.

Last of all came the two infernal ships, swaying unsteadily with the current; the pilots of course, as they neared the bridge, having noiselessly effected their escape in the skiffs. The slight fire upon the deck scarcely illuminated the dark phantom-like hulls. Both were carried by the current clear of the raft, which, by a great error of judgment, as it now appeared, on the part of the builders, had only been made to protect the floating portion of the bridge. The Fortune came first, staggering inside the raft, and then lurching clumsily against the dyke, and grounding near Kalloo, without touching the bridge. There was a moment's pause of expectation. At last the slow match upon the deck burned out, and there was a faint and partial explosion, by which little or no damage was produced...

The troops of Parma, crowding on the palisade, and looking over the parapets, now began to greet the exhibition with peals of derisive laughter. It was but child's play, they thought, to threaten a Spanish army, and a general like Alexander Farnese, with such paltry fire-works as these. Nevertheless all eyes were anxiously fixed upon the remaining fire-ship, or "hell-burner", the Hope, which had now drifted very near the place of its destination. Tearing her way between the raft and the shore, she struck heavily against the bridge on the Kalloo side, close to the block-house at the commencement of the floating portion of the bridge. A thin wreath of smoke was seen curling over a slight and smouldering fire upon her deck...

The clockwork had been better adjusted than the slow match in the Fortune. Scarcely had Alexander reached the entrance of Saint Mary's Fort, at the end of the bridge, when a horrible explosion was heard. The Hope disappeared, together with the men who had boarded her, and the block-house, against which she had struck, with all its garrison, while a large portion of the bridge, with all the troops stationed upon it, had vanished into air. It was the work of a single instant. The Scheldt yawned to its lowest depth, and then cast its waters across the dykes, deep into the forts, and far over the land. The earth shook as with the throb of a volcano. A wild glare lighted up the scene for one moment, and was then succeeded by pitchy darkness. Houses were toppled down miles away, and not a living thing, even in remote places, could keep its feet. The air was filled with a rain of plough-shares, grave-stones, and marble balls, intermixed with the heads, limbs, and bodies, of what had been human beings. Slabs of granite, vomited by the flaming ship, were found afterwards at a league's distance, and buried deep in the earth. A thousand soldiers were destroyed in a second of time; many of them being torn to shreds, beyond even the semblance of humanity.

Richebourg disappeared, and was not found until several days later, when his body was discovered; doubled around an iron chain, which hung from one of the bridge-boats in the centre of the river. The veteran Robles, Seigneur de Billy, a Portuguese officer of eminent service and high military rank, was also destroyed. Months afterwards, his body was discovered adhering to the timber-work of the bridge, upon the ultimate removal of that structure, and was only recognized by a peculiar gold chain which he habitually wore. Parma himself was thrown to the ground, stunned by a blow on the shoulder from a flying stake. The page, who was behind him, carrying his helmet, fell dead without a wound, killed by the concussion of the air.

== Influence on the Battle of Gravelines ==
The events in Antwerp gave the hellburners an immediate notoriety; the concept generated enormous interest with military experts all over Europe. The fireships sent against the Spanish Armada on 7 August 1588 in the night before the Battle of Gravelines were taken to be hellburners, because Giambelli was known to be employed by Elizabeth in England at that date, and eight regular warships, much larger than typical fireships of the time, had been sacrificed for the attack. They were actually nowhere near as deadly; the English at that moment lacked even the gunpowder to resupply their ships for regular use, but were successful in breaking the fleet's formation, their mistaken identity contributing to the panic. Giambelli was in fact working on constructing a mined ship beam from masts, costing £2000, to block the Thames against an invasion.
