= Federigo Giambelli =

16th-century Italian engineer

Federigo Giambelli (or Gianibelli; also given as Genebelli or Genibelli in contemporary English texts), was an Italian military and civil engineer who worked in Spain, the Spanish Netherlands and England in the late 16th and early 17th centuries.

== Early life and Spanish service ==
Giambelli was born at Mantua about the middle of the 16th century. Having had some experience as a military engineer in Italy, he went to Spain to offer his services to Philip II. However, his proposals were given a lukewarm reception, and as he could obtain no immediate employment from the king, he moved to Antwerp, where he soon gained considerable reputation for his knowledge in various departments of science. He is said to have married while living there.

== The Siege of Antwerp ==
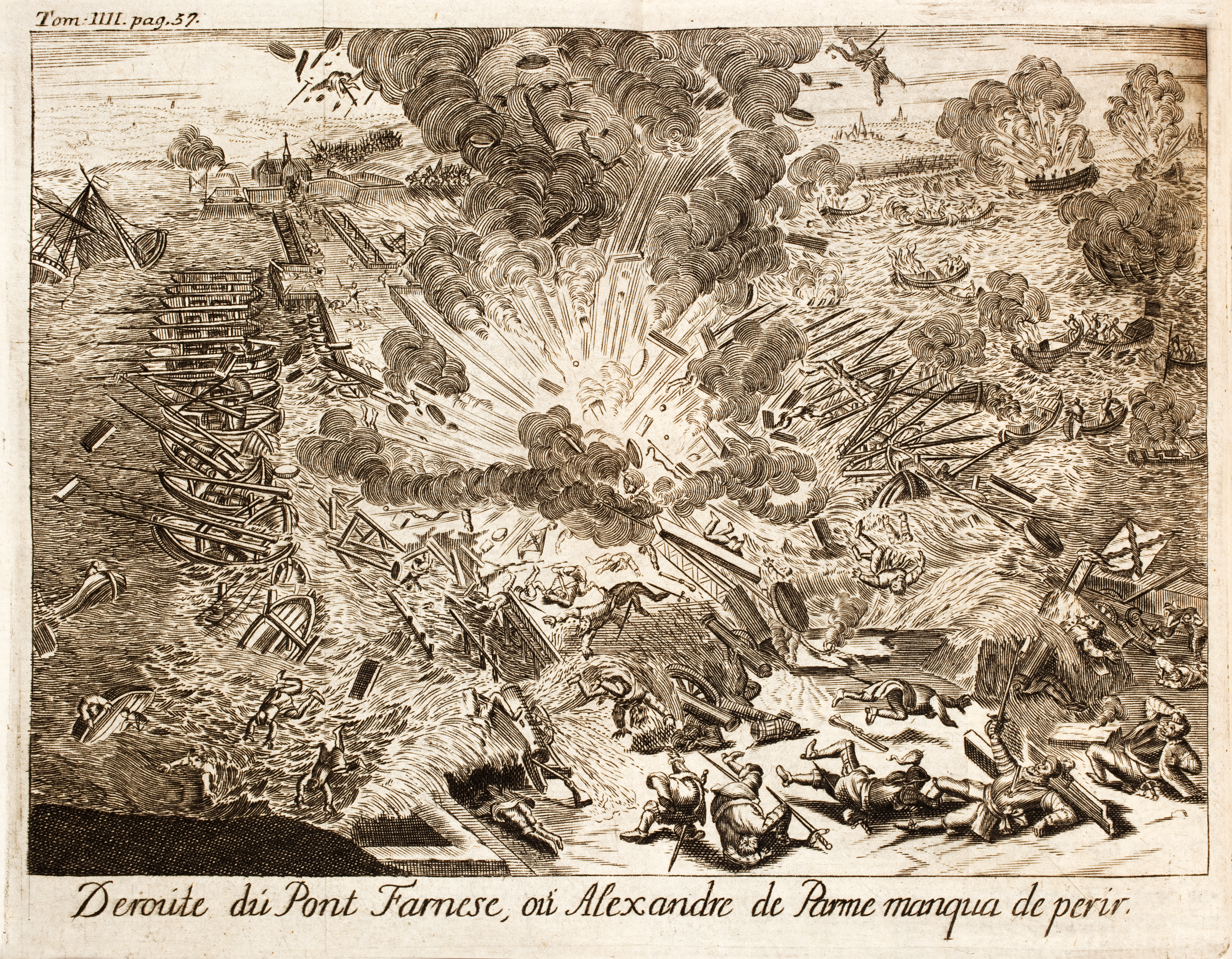
An 18th century engraving, depicting the explosion of one of Giambelli's "hellburners" on the Duke of Parma's pontoon bridge at the Siege of Antwerp in 1585.

Giambelli is said to have sworn vengeance for his rebuff at the Spanish court; and when Antwerp was besieged by Alexander Farnese, Duke of Parma in 1584, he offered his services to Elizabeth I of England, who, having satisfied herself of his abilities, engaged him to advise in its defence. His plans for provisioning the town were rejected by the senate, but they agreed to a modification of his scheme for destroying the pontoon bridge which closed the entrance to the town from the side of the sea, by the conversion of two ships of 60 and 70 tons into "infernal machines" or "hellburners". Each ship had a masonry chamber built into the hold, filled with 7,000 pounds (3,175 kilograms) of gunpowder and heaped over with millstones, tombstones and scrap iron; stacks of timber and brushwood on the top deck were set alight to give the impression that it was an ordinary fire ship. The explosive charge was to be detonated by a clockwork mechanism activating a flintlock. One of these ships exploded against the bridge, and besides allegedly killing more than 1000 Spanish soldiers, effected a breach in the structure of more than 200 feet (61 Metres) in width. This might have led to the relief of the town by the waiting Dutch fleet, were it not for the hesitation of Vice-Admiral Jacob Jacobsen (or Jacobzoon).

== Service in England ==
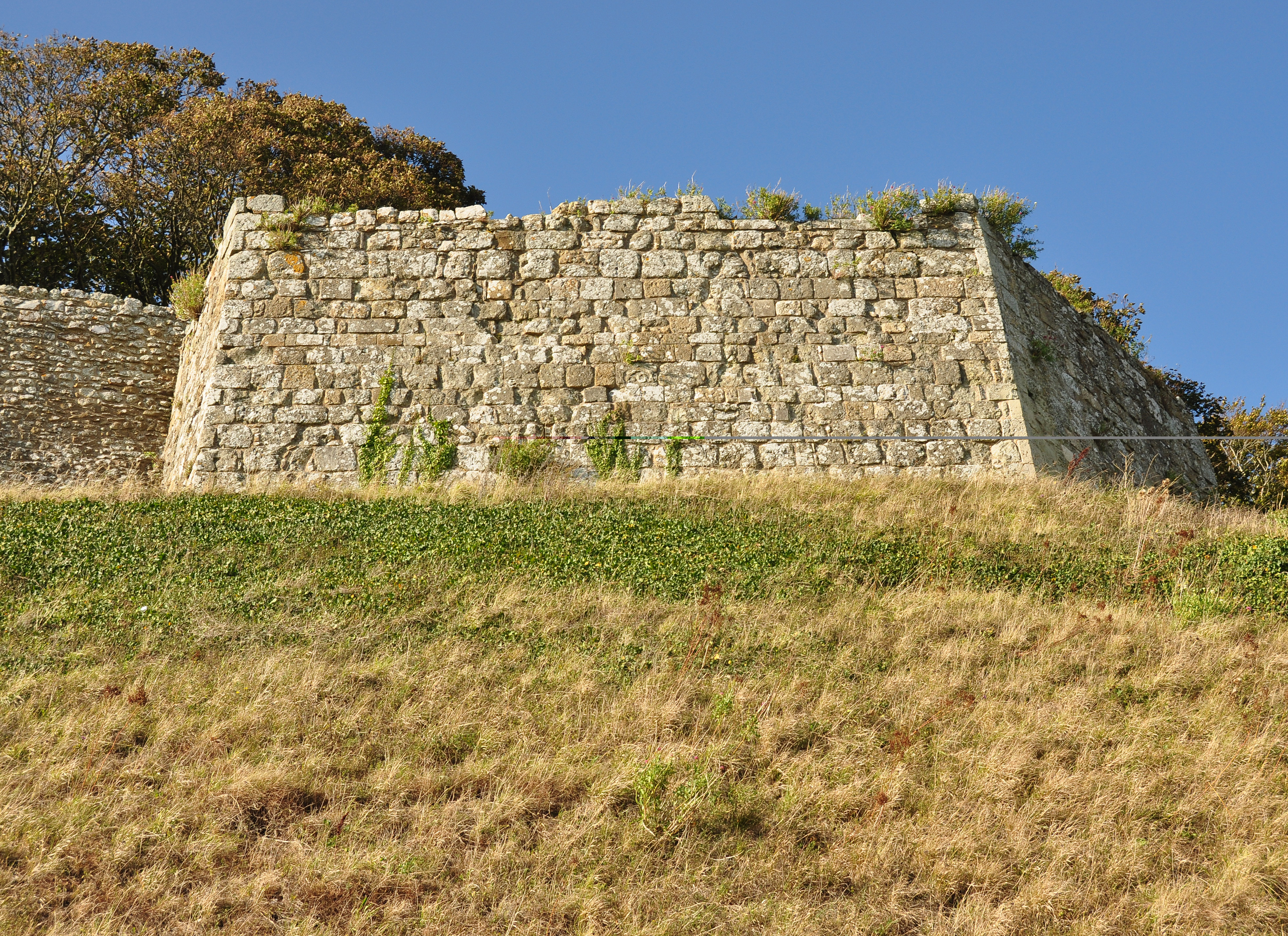
One of Giambelli's bastions at Carisbrook Castle, built between 1597 and 1600.

After the surrender of Antwerp, Giambelli went to England, where he was employed by the Crown between 1585 and 1602, the last in a line of a number of Italian engineers at the English court. He was engaged during July and August 1588 in fortifying the Thames Estuary, which was considered the most likely site for the expected Spanish invasion. Works included the construction of earthen ramparts around the old blockhouses at Tilbury and Gravesend, and a boom defence across the river, consisting of a chain supported by 120 ships' masts costing £2000; a pontoon bridge was also constructed to allow the English army to deploy on either shore. The boom broke at the first flood tide after its completion. The exact contribution of Giambelli to these works is unknown, because he is not mentioned in any of the reports made by the Earl of Leicester, the commander of the English army in Essex; however, his name is noted in the accounts, drawing a respectable fee of six shillings and eight pence (£0.33) per day. When the Spanish Armada was attacked by fireships in the Calais roads, the panic which ensued was largely due to the conviction among the Spaniards that the fireships were "infernal machines" constructed by Giambelli; however they were unaware that he was fully occupied by the defensive works in the Thames and that a national shortage of gunpowder prevented its use in the English fireships.

In 1591, Giambelli presented a plan to the Lord Burghley for a water system to cleanse the fetid ditches surrounding the City of London and another (perhaps a type of fire hydrant) which would allow fires in the city to be fought more effectively. Neither of these schemes seem to have been acted upon.

Starting in 1597, Giambelli constructed a trace Italienne fortification surrounding Carisbrook Castle on the Isle of Wight; the work was mostly completed by 1600, but remodelling of two of the castle's original towers was not completed until 1603. In 1602 at the request of the Privy Council, Giambelli surveyed the fort on Plymouth Hoe, which was sited on the location now occupied by the Royal Citadel, following complaints that the defences were inadequate. Giambelli made three reports on Plymouth. He suggested surrounding the town with a wall with nine ravelins.

He is said to have died in London, but the year of his death is unknown.
