= Fin de la guerre =

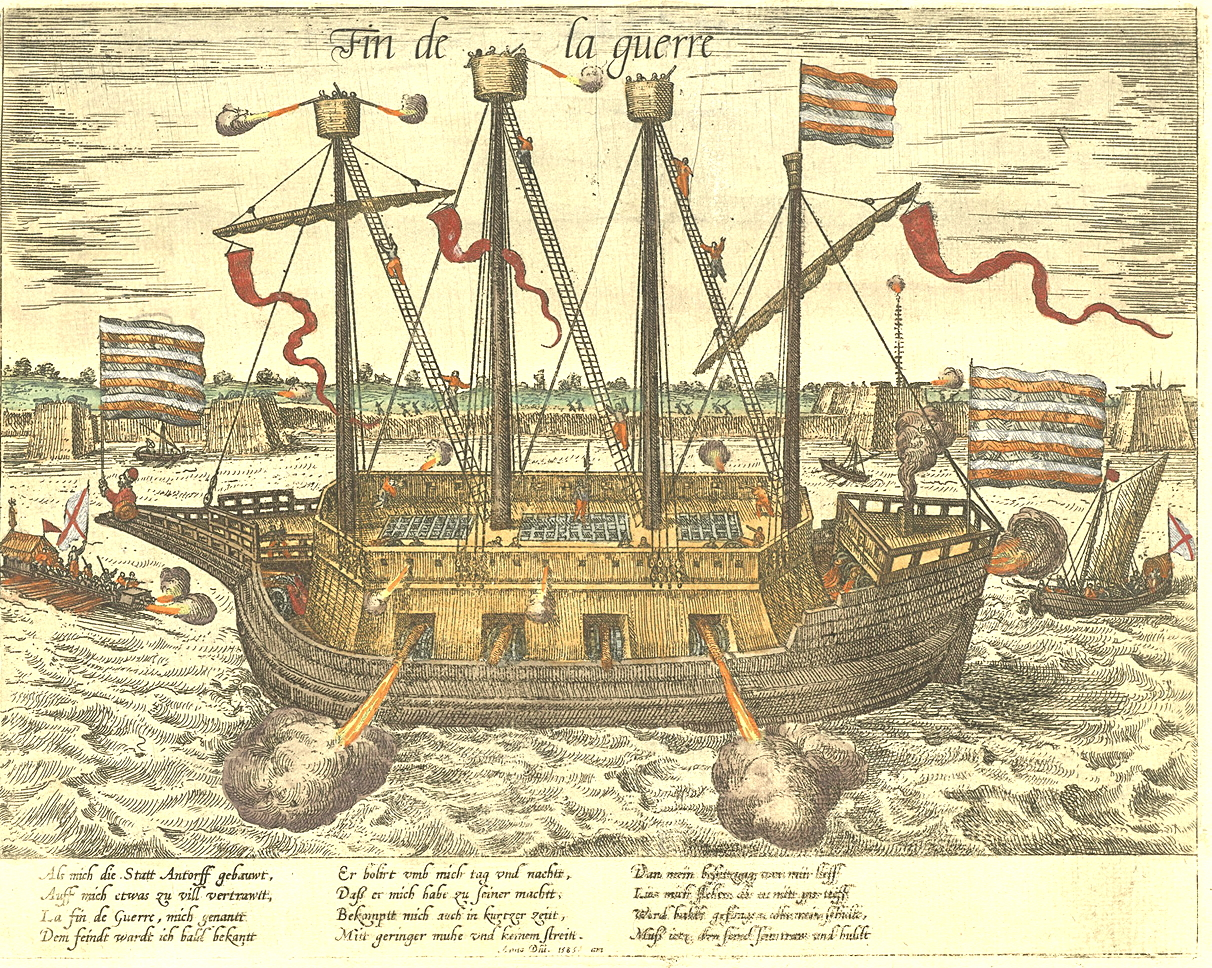
Antwerpian Fin de la guerre of 1585

Fin de la guerre (French for "End of War"; also called by its Spanish or Latin name, Fin de la Guerra or Finis Belli) was an Antwerpian rebel ship employed during the siege of Antwerp (1585) against the imperial Spanish forces.

The vessel resembled a huge floating fighting platform, featuring a castle in its center manned by a large number of guns and a thousand musketeers. According to some sources, the ship was protected by thick iron plates. The defenders put great faith into the construction to relieve the siege, thus its name. When put into action, however, the vessel proved too heavy for the shallow waterways and soon ran aground, prompting some Spanish to call it mockingly Los gastos perdidos (The lost expenditure).

After one final, unsuccessful sortie, Antwerp was ultimately forced to surrender in August 1585.

== Sources ==
- Martín, Juan Giménez (1999), Tercios de Flandes, Falcata Ibérica, pp. 180–186, ISBN 978-84-930446-0-2, books.google
- Rudloff, Johannes (1910), "Die Einführung der Panzerung im Kriegschiffbau und die Entwicklung der ersten Panzerflotten", Beiträge zur Geschichte der Technik und Industrie, 2 (1): 1–58. Online at digizeitschriften.de
- Robert Henry Thurston: The Earliest Iron-Clad. In: Cassier’s Magazine. vol. 6, 1891, p. 312–314 archive.org.

== See also ==
- Revolt of the Netherlands
- Santa Anna (1522 ship)
