= Iconoclastic riots in Livonia =

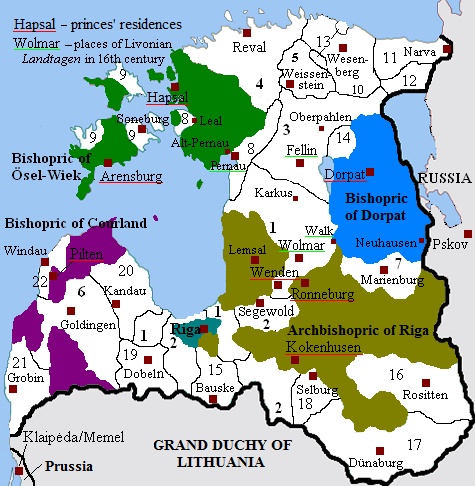
Old Livonia in 1534. Livonian Order (Sword Brothers) Bishopric of Courland Bishopric of Ösel–Wiek Bishopric of Dorpat City of Riga Archbishopric of Riga

Iconoclast riots in Livonia was the destruction of icons and ornate church furnishings between 1522 and 1524, triggered by the rejection of religious opulence and the veneration of icons during the Reformation in the year 1524. In major cities of the Livonian Confederation, particularly Riga and Dorpat (Tartu), triggered by the arrival of radical Anabaptist preacher Melchior Hoffman. Reformation supporters stormed churches, initially looting them and later confiscating part of their property.

== History ==
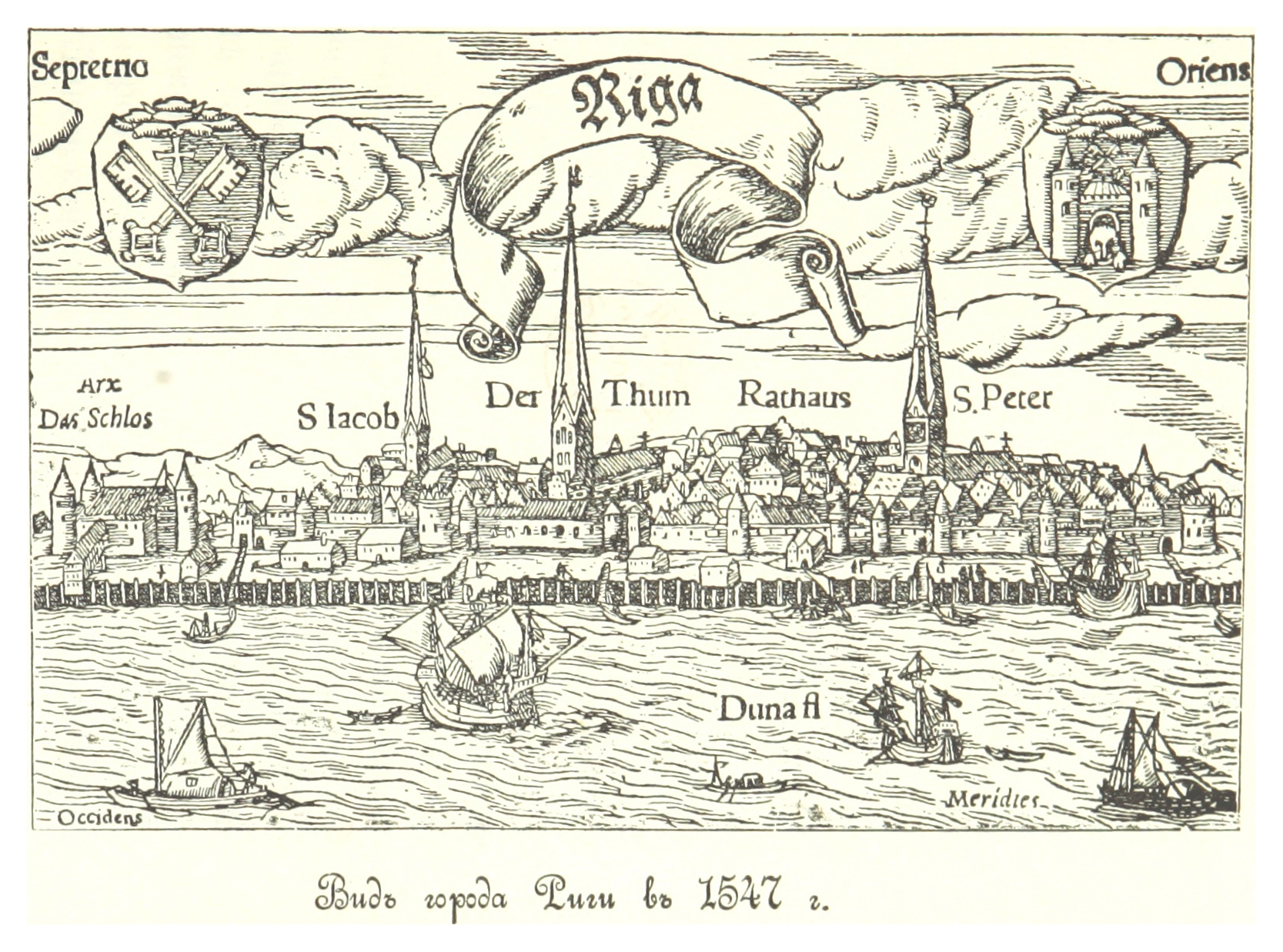
Riga in 1547. The three church towers: St. James's Church, Riga Cathedral, St. Peter's Church

Initially, the Reformation affected mainly the German-speaking population of the Baltic, but by the 1520s, some Latvian and Estonian congregations emerged in urban centers, with services in native languages. However, significant religious publications in Latvian and Estonian did not appear until much later.

After Martin Luther publicly denounced the Pope of Rome in 1521, the Diet of Worms of the Holy Roman Empire declared Luther a heretic. On August 20, 1522, Riga City Council's secretary Johann Lohmüller sent a letter to Luther, asking him to become an apostle “to Livonia, the farthest land in northern Europe and almost unknown to the Christian world." In 1523, Luther sent a message to Riga titled: "To the Elect Beloved Friends of God, All Christians in Riga, Reval (Tallinn), and Dorpat (Tartu) in Livonia, My Beloved Lords and Brothers in Christ."

In 1523, in the town of Wolmar (Valmiera), a furrier named Melchior Hoffmann began preaching the doctrines of Luther and the Wittenberg Reformation. He urged not only disobedience to the Pope (which had already taken root) but also active attacks on Catholics. Influenced by these sermons, unrest began in several cities across Livonia.

Meanwhile, in 1524, the German Peasants' War erupted in the Holy Roman Empire. Simultaneously, unrest began in Riga as members of the Brotherhood of Blackheads attacked their own altar in St. Peter's Church. During the riots—or possibly later during the Calendar riots in Riga—the famous altarpiece created by Albrecht Dürer in 1520 was lost. In the following days, the destruction of altars and icons at St. Peter's and St. James's Church became widespread, and soon extended to Riga Cathedral, which housed twenty altars.

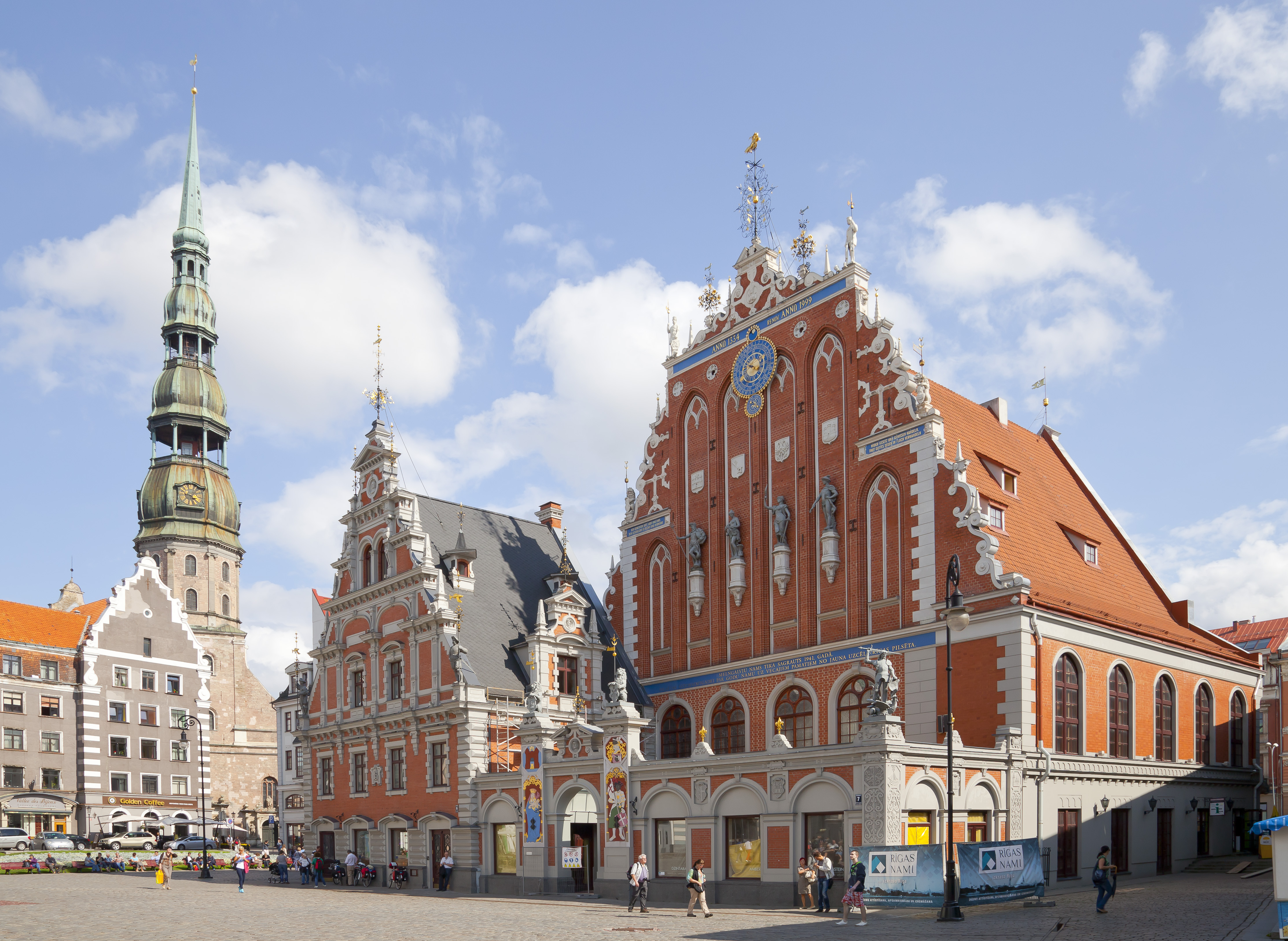
St. Peter's Church and House of Blackheads in the 21st century

Taking advantage of the situation, the Riga City Council in November 1524 banned services in the cathedral, confiscated property belonging to the Roman Catholic Church, and closed both the cathedral and the monasteries. Only the Cistercian and Franciscan convents for women remained in operation. Later, Lutherans looted the cathedral again. The bronze tomb monument of former Roman Catholic Archbishop of Riga Jasper Linde was melted down to make cannons. Paintings from the Virgin Mary’s altar were subjected to a so-called “witch test” — floated down the Daugava River and then burned.

After Melchior Hoffmann expulsion in 1526, a more moderate Lutheranism took hold, retaining some Catholic traditions. Catholic bishops remained in cities like Reval and Dorpat.

A severe blow to the Catholics came with the confiscation of church treasures, the seizure of hospital and cathedral chapter properties, the destruction of monastic libraries, the mass destruction of artworks, and the expulsion of clergy, monks, and nuns from Riga. St. John's Church was converted into a warehouse. Later, it was leased to councilor R. Schulte, who turned the altar space into a stable for horses, and later also for cows and pigs. After lengthy and complex litigation, the council terminated the lease around 1554. Following the restoration of the roof and tower, the church was cleaned in October 1555 and then repurposed as the city arsenal, since a cannon foundry was located in a nearby former monastery building.

Gradually, the destroyed churches were taken over by Lutheran congregations, while monastic properties were absorbed by the Riga City Council.

The first Lutheran catechism in Estonian was printed in Germany in 1554. The first Latvian book, a Catholic catechism by Jesuit Peter Canisius, was printed in 1586. Soon after, Lutherans published a Latvian handbook in Königsberg.

By 1600, most Lutheran clergy in Courland were still German, though some began learning local languages. The first original Latvian book was Lettische Postill by Georg Mancelius, finished in 1639 and published in 1654. A complete Latvian Bible wasn't available until 1685.

== See also ==
- Beeldenstorm

== Literature ==
- Rubenis, Andris. The Culture of the Renaissance and Reformation Era in Europe. – Riga: Zvaigzne ABC, 2000.
