= Iconophobia =

- Specialty: Psychology

Iconophobia (literally fear of icons) refers to an aversion to images, especially religious icons. Iconophobia is differentiated from iconoclasm in that iconophobia refers to the aversion to or hatred of the images whereas iconoclasm refers to the actual destruction of images that may arise from iconophobia. Chari Larsson wrote:

“If iconophobia is defined as the suspicion and anxiety towards the power exerted by images, its history is an ancient one in all of its Platonic, Christian, and Judaic forms. At its most radical, iconophobia results in an act of iconoclasm, or the total destruction of the image. At the other end of the spectrum, contemporary iconophobia may be more subtle. Images are simply withdrawn from circulation with the aim of eliminating their visibility.”

The history of iconophobia begins with ancient Greece and Rome and continues with the violent iconoclasms of the period 726-842 in the Eastern Orthodox Church within the Byzantine Empire. But it is the Protestant Reformation that is most associated with iconophobia: “The Protestant Reformation, initiated by Martin Luther in 1517, brought iconophobia to the forefront of contemporary politics... Iconophobia was pushed to its extreme in the teachings of John Calvin... Protestant iconophobia had a huge and not exclusively negative impact on aesthetics and the history of art. It permanently affected the ways images were made, exhibited, and judged.”

== Iconophobia and the English Reformation ==
The leading historian of English Protestantism, Patrick Collinson, applied the term iconophobia to a specific period in post-Reformation England in his 1985 Stenton Lecture, From Iconoclasm to Iconophobia: the Cultural Impact of the Second English Reformation. The arguments also informed chapter 4 of his 1988 book, The Birthpangs of Protestant England. Collinson’s work has shaped a generation of scholarly enquiry into the impact of religion on culture, and of culture on religion, in post-reformation England. Scholars have accepted, rejected, and modified Collinson’s arguments, but one way or another they continue to exert a powerful influence over reformation studies.

Collinson carefully re-defined iconoclasm (generally defined as “the destruction of religious icons and other images or monuments for religious or political motives”) in his essay as follows:

“The first generation of Protestant publicists and propagandists, the Edwardian generation, made polemical and creative use of cultural vehicles which their spiritual children and grandchildren later repudiated, as part of their rather general programme of rejection. They wrote and staged Protestant plays. They sang Protestant songs and godly ballads to secular and popular tunes. And they made brilliant use of the graphic image, both to attack Catholicism and to commend their own religious convictions and values. These strategies constitute, for my purpose, what is meant by Iconoclasm ... Iconoclasm in this sense may imply the substitution of other, acceptable images, or the refashioning of some images for an altered purpose.”

Iconophobia, by comparison, is defined as “the total repudiation of all images”, which Collinson associates with a watershed moment around 1580, introducing a “sudden and drastic” change. This “secondary thrust” of reform “came close to dispensing with images and the mimetic altogether, while disparaging the tastes and capacities of the illiterate, the mass of the people”.

Collinson describes the “age of extreme iconophobia” as “quite short, equivalent to little more than a single generation”. Nevertheless, much subsequent scholarship has suggested that iconophobia characterised post-Reformation Protestantism from 1580 onwards.
