= The Sermon of Saint John the Baptist (Bruegel) =

Painting by Pieter Bruegel the Elder

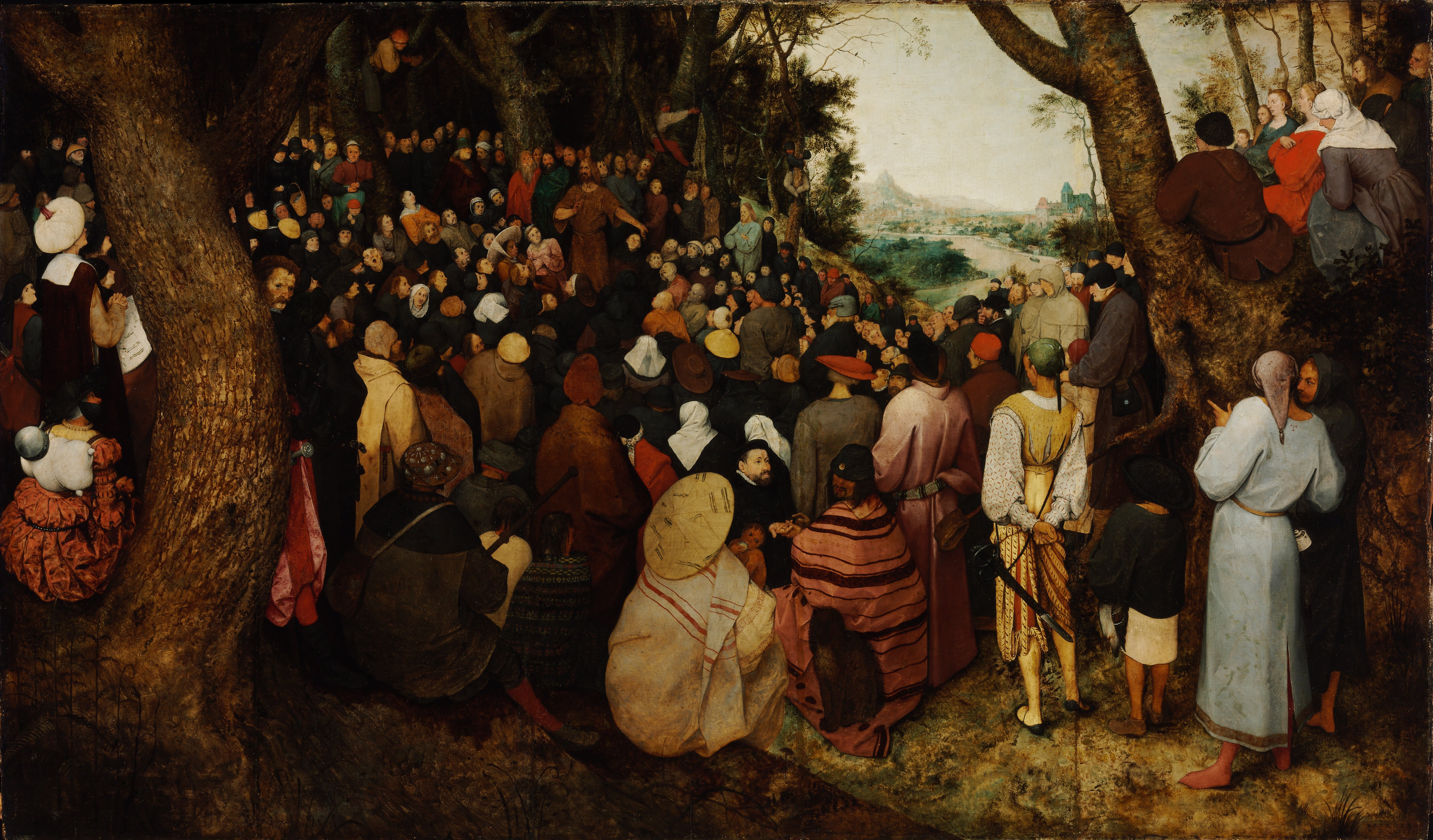
- Artist: Pieter Bruegel the Elder
- Medium: Oil on panel
- Dimensions: 95 cm × 160.5 cm (37 in × 63.2 in)
- Location: Museum of Fine Arts, Budapest

The Sermon of Saint John the Baptist (or The Preaching of Saint John the Baptist) is a painting of 1566 by the Netherlandish Renaissance artist Pieter Bruegel the Elder in the Museum of Fine Arts in Budapest, Hungary. It was painted as oil on panel.

According to author Russell Shorto, the painting was "a sly blessing" on "hedge sermons" given by Calvinist preachers "in a field outside the city walls, safely beyond the jurisdiction of the king's men", the king being Philip II of Spain, who had banned Protestant worship in Dutch cities.

== See also ==
- List of paintings by Pieter Bruegel the Elder
