= Fall of Antwerp =

1585 end of siege by Spanish forces against a Dutch garrison in Eighty Years' War

Coordinates: 51.2167°N 4.4°E

- Part of the Eighty Years' War
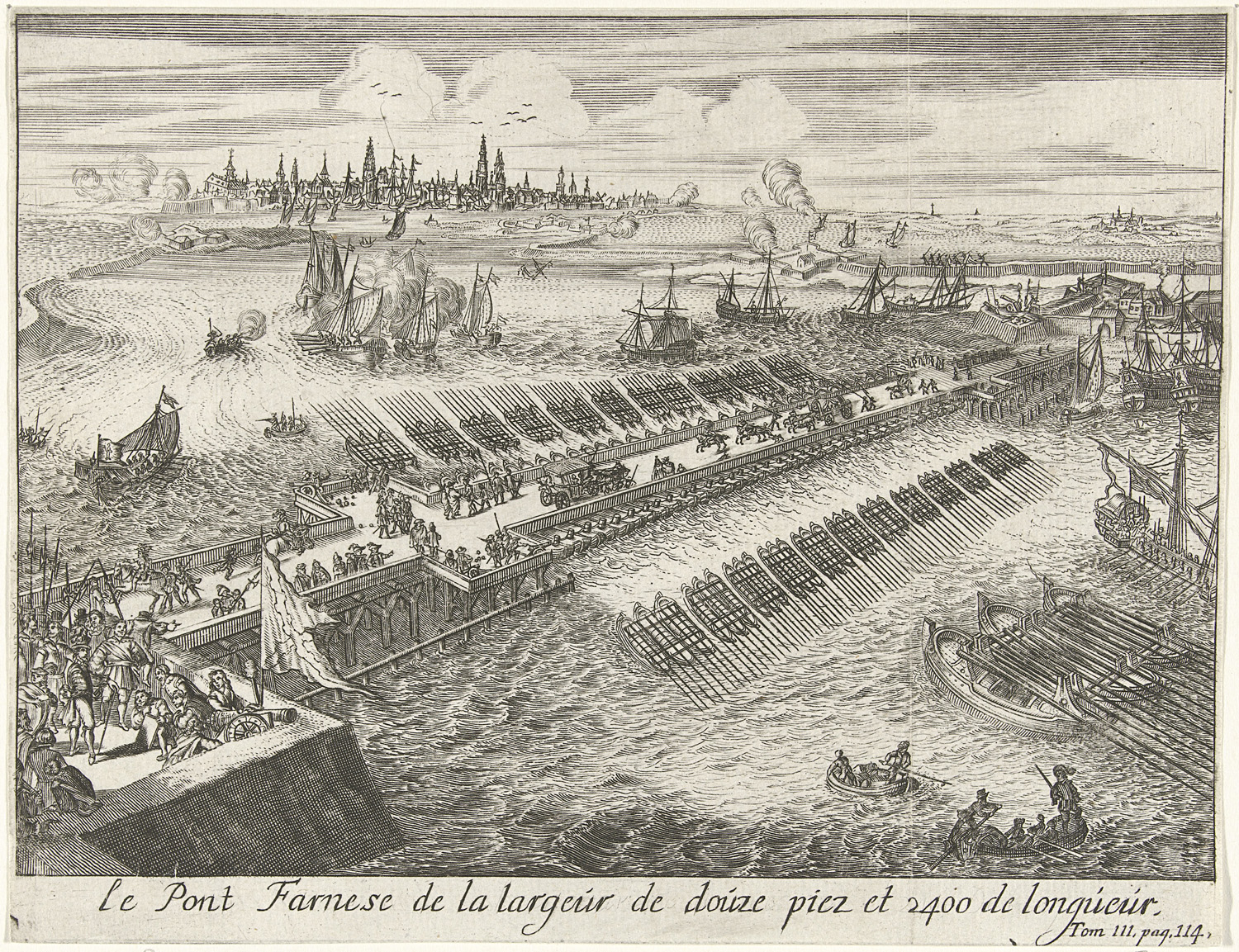
- Parma's bridge over the Scheldt in 1585, built of ships.
Date	July 1584 – 17 August 1585
Location	Antwerp (present-day Belgium)
Result	Spanish victory

Belligerents
(Dutch Republic) States-General	Spain

Commanders and leaders
(Dutch Republic) Philips van Marnix	(Spain) Alessandro Farnese

Strength
80,000 men	40,000 men

Casualties and losses
8,000	~1,800

The fall of Antwerp (Dutch: val van Antwerpen [vɑl vɑn ˈɑntʋɛrpə(n)]) on 17 August 1585 took place during the Eighty Years' War, after a siege lasting over a year from July 1584 until August 1585. The city of Antwerp was the focal point of the Protestant-dominated Dutch Revolt, but was forced to surrender to the Spanish forces under the command of Alessandro Farnese. Under the terms agreed, all the Protestants of Antwerp were given four years to settle their affairs and leave the city. Many migrated north, especially to Amsterdam. Apart from losing a high proportion of its middle class and mercantile population, Antwerp's trade suffered for two centuries afterwards as Dutch forts blockaded the River Scheldt until 1795.

== Background ==
At the time Antwerp, in modern Belgium, was not only the largest city of the Habsburg Netherlands, but was also the cultural, economic, and financial centre of the Seventeen Provinces and of Northwestern Europe. On 4 November 1576, unpaid Spanish soldiery mutinied: they plundered and burnt the city during what was called the Spanish Fury. Thousands of citizens were massacred and hundreds of houses were burnt down. As a result, Antwerp became even more engaged in the rebellion against the rule of Habsburg Spain. The city joined the Union of Utrecht (1579) and became the capital of the Dutch Revolt, which no longer was merely a Protestant rebellion but had become a revolt of all Dutch provinces.

Relieved from the great battles with the Ottomans in the Mediterranean, Philip II of Spain turned his attention back to the uprising in the Low Countries and in the autumn of 1577 sent prince Alessandro Farnese with reinforcement troops to aid Don Juan of Austria in Flanders regain control over Flanders, Brabant, and the United Provinces. Don Juan died on October 1, 1578, whereupon Farnese became the Governor-General of the Spanish Netherlands and Captain-General of the army of Flanders. In mid-June, 1584, Alexander Farnese had decided the time was right to make preparations for besieging Antwerp. Farnese left Bruges for Antwerp on July 3, 1584. When the siege of Antwerp began (1584) most of the County of Flanders and the Duchy of Brabant had been recaptured in the preceding year. The Prince of Parma's forces had been reinforced in the previous years, both in quantity and quality, yet at the start of the siege, his troops did not exceed 10,000 infantrymen and 1,700 cavalrymen.

== Siege ==
During the recapture of Flanders and Brabant, Farnese improved the logistics of the Spanish army in Flanders by further investing in what is dubbed the "Spanish Road." It was a main road leading north from Habsburg holdings in Northern Italy into the Low Countries, protected by forts built at strategic intervals, to provide the army with a reliable flow of supplies. When the siege of Antwerp began Parma's army was well supplied. The first stage of the siege saw encirclement lines constructed around Antwerp and forts built along the Scheldt estuary so as to cut off trade with Ghent and Dendermonde. The purpose of capturing the strongholds along both banks of the Scheldt would have allowed Parma to control the passage of vessels trying to deliver relief supplies to Antwerp. Fort Lillo wasn't captured so an alternative plan to control river traffic had to be devised; the construction of a bridge to blockade the Scheldt.

=== Farnese's bridge ===
So as to negate any effects from not possessing Lillo, it was decided to build the bridge in a spot upstream from the fort and where the river makes two sharp bends. Two new forts were built; Saint-Mary on the Flemish bank and Saint-Philip on the Brabant bank. The bridge was built between these two forts. The bridge is described as follows:

Starting from fort Saint-Mary, the estacade was formed by large, solid tree trunks, deeply driven into the riverbed or into the sandbar, spaced three feet apart from each other in width, and four feet in length. These tree trunks were planted as close to the middle of the Scheldt as possible, out to a distance of 450 feet, the point where the depth of the riverbed no longer allowed piles to be driven. This formidable matrix of piles was joined together by heavy wooden beams, well nailed and immobilized by chains, which gave the entire structure an unfailing rigidity and stability. On this foundation was laid a pathway, made of heavy wooden planks and beams, which formed the bridge itself, and which was protected, on both sides – on the Antwerpian (up river) side and on the Zealander side (down river) – by a musket ball proof parapet made of wood and packed with clay. Between the fort of Saint-Mary and the center of the bridge, but closer to the fort than to the middle of the river, on each side, Farnese had twelve equally massive piles driven into the riverbed, securely chained and connected by heavy beams; these piles advanced a few meters into the Scheldt, beyond the main line of the estacade, so as to form a kind of ravelin with parapet. On this ravelin, which projected out from the estacade, the Prince installed a battery of three demi-cannons, for the defense of the bulwark against an attack by enemy ships, and stationed fifty soldiers there. A little bit beyond each side of the bridge along its length, between the fort of Saint-Mary and the end of the ravelin, were additional piles driven into the sandbar, slightly exceeding the water level of the river, and interconnected by heavy beams, which, in this way, constituted a sturdy stop barrier for enemy ships or machines which could come up against the estacade.

Starting at fort Saint-Philip, an estacade constructed exactly like the one which we just described, extended out from that side towards the middle of the river, for a distance of 950 feet. Between the two parts of the bridge which were thus advancing to meet one another, a large space of about 1,000 paces, had remained open, where the depth and flow of the Scheldt did not allow tree trunks or piles to be driven into the riverbed. Alessandro Farnese had 32 large barks, which had been brought from Ghent by way of the Stekene Canal, placed side by side, one next to the other. At the bow and stern, these boats were each immobilized with two anchors and chained one to the other. Each boat was equipped with two pieces of artillery. There was a distance of about 10 feet between them, but they were held in place and in line by a solid chain which ran from one to the other and connected them all together, and by way of a deck that covered all of them. In order to defend the approaches of the entire bridge, the Prince had put just beyond, approximately within reach of a line, both on the Antwerpian side and on the Zealander side, a row of 33 boats arranged in groups of three. The three boats of each group were joined together by strong pieces of wood, and upon the boats were lying, pointed in the direction of the enemy and securely fastened, the ship masts which had been fetched from Denmark and the Scandinavian countries. Each of these masts was fitted at the tip with a large iron point, in the form of a lance, and was to be used to keep at some distance the boats, the ships, and the machines that the enemy would probably not fail to send toward the estacade with the intention of destroying it. The soldiers called these two barriers, which resembled rafts, “the floaters.” To complete this defense system, twenty vessels were stationed near the Flemish riverbank and twenty near the Brabantian riverbank, ready to intervene at any moment.

The entire span of this gigantic structure was no less than 2,400 feet in length from one bank to the other.

It was completed on February 25, 1585.

=== Federigo Giambelli's "infernal machines" ===
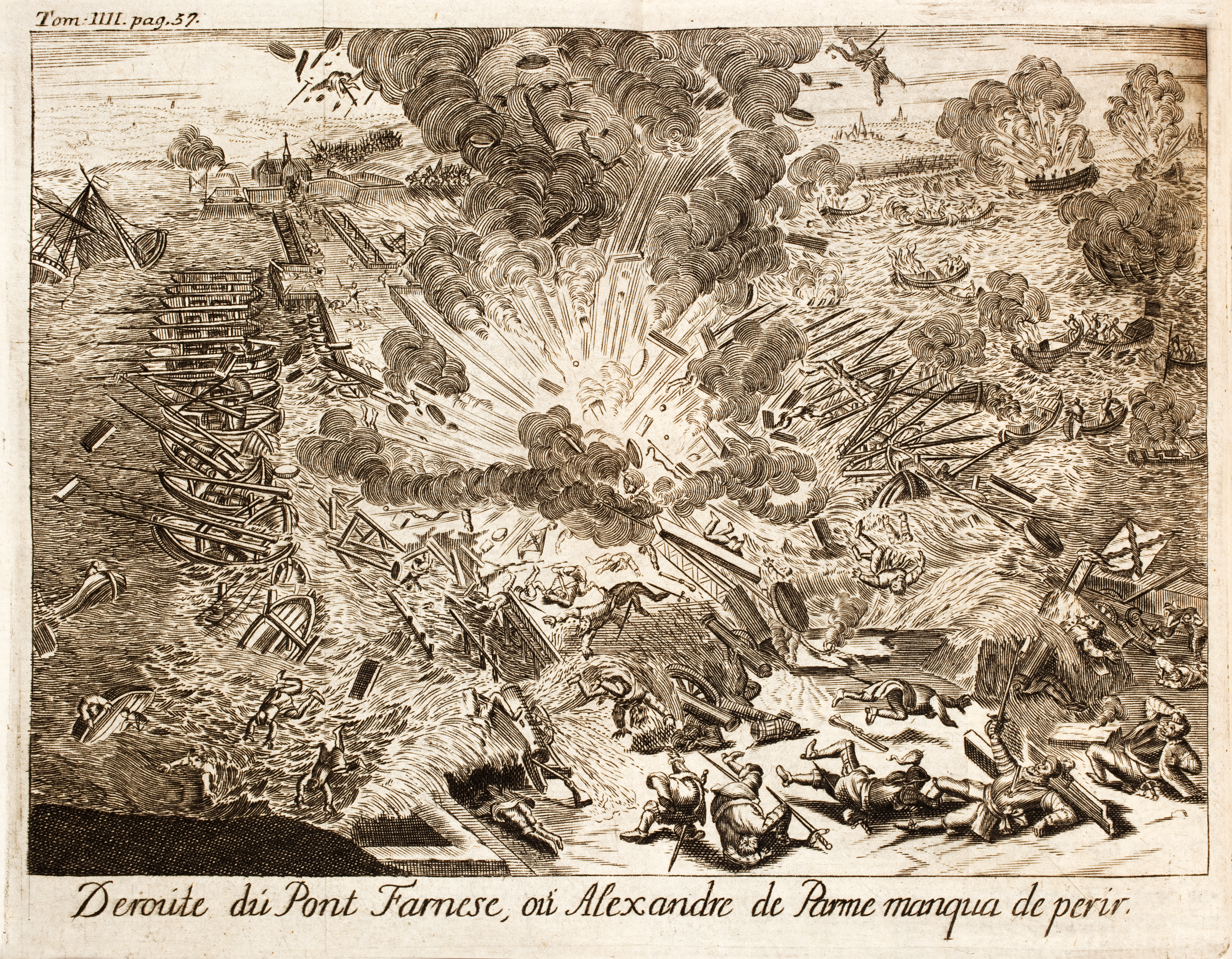
Parma nearly died during the attack on his pontoon bridge in 1585. Famiano Strada: Histoire de la guerre des Païs-Bas, 1727.

In response to the closure of the Scheldt by this bridge, the Dutch flooded the lowlands adjacent to the Scheldt, effectively submerging most roads in scattered areas and leaving Spanish forts either flooded or isolated on small islands. Despite the Dutch using these floodplains to try to regain control over the Scheldt (using low draft oar and sail boats with small cannon emplacements on them), the Spanish position largely held firm, as many of the Spanish forts had been equipped with cannon and high quality troops. Several attempts were made by the Dutch to steer "fire ships" into the Spanish pontoon bridge with the first and most spectacular of which being Federigo Giambelli's "infernal machines". The cargo hold of each of two ships were converted into masonry lined blast chambers filled with gunpowder and heaped over with old gravestones, pieces of marble, iron hooks, stone balls, nails, and scrap metal then covered with planks and brush to give the appearance of an ordinary fire-ship. To ignite these floating bombs, one was equipped with a slow-burning match cord and the other had a sophisticated clock work that would throw sparks at a preset time. On the evening of April 4, 1585, the ships were launched. The ship with the clockwork ran aground along the riverbank quite some distance from the bridge where the powder ignited with a loud thunder and a flash that lit up both riverbanks for an instant followed by a column of smoke. The other ship managed to avoid the floating rafts and came to rest against the estacade on the Flemish side where it detonated. The river's water was sent over the dikes flooding everything in its path, stones were hurled nearly a mile away, the earth in Antwerp trembled, 800 Spaniards are said to have been killed, Caspar de Robles being one of the casualties. Antwerpian sailors were sent to assess the damage but the effect of the explosion terrified them so that they didn't venture far enough. The Dutch were supposed to launch a relief mission from Holland and Zeeland following the launch of a signal rocket but since the reconnaissance team reported there was no damage, the rocket wasn't launched and the project aborted. Upon noticing that there were no ships approaching the bridge, Farnese immediately set to repairing the damage done to the bridge. The repair was merely a façade which the Hollanders discovered some days later.

=== Battle of Kouwenstein ===
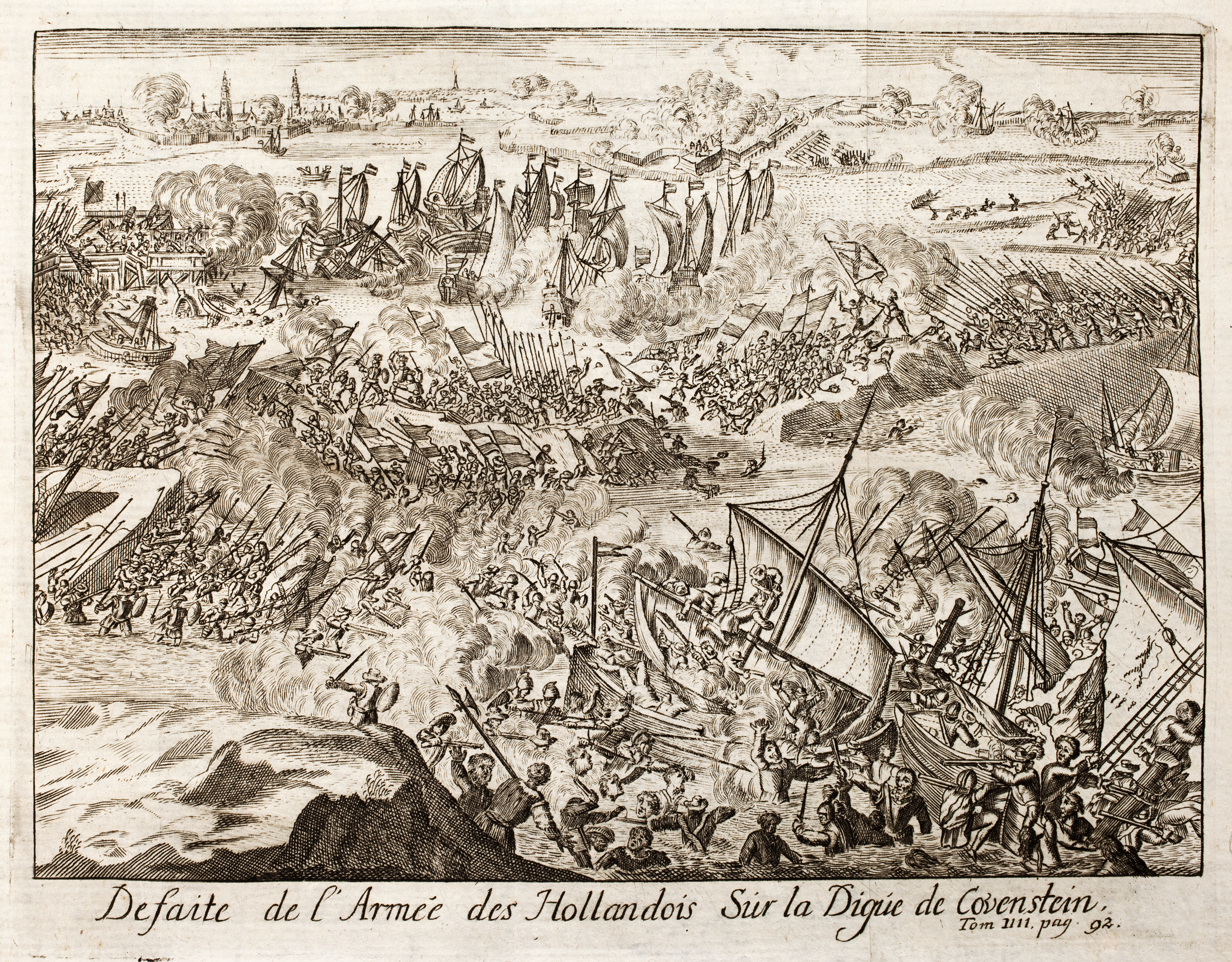
Defeat of the rebels on the Kouwensteinsedijk near the pontoon bridge, 26 May 1585. Lamberecht Causé in Famiano Strada Histoire de la guerre des Païs Bas, 1727.

The rebels weren't ready to give up yet. Their next plan was to attack the Kouwenstein counter-dike and demolish large portions so as to allow relief ships from Holland and Zeeland to pass. The Kouwenstein dike was a low-lying levee three miles long, in many places barely ten feet wide, with deep water on both sides. It ran from Stabroek in Brabant (where Mansfeld's troops were encamped) across the flooded land, to the Scheldt, not far from Fort Lillo. Farnese understood the strategic importance of this dike and had it fortified. Though the first attempt to demolish it failed, Farnese took further preventive measures. The second attempt was on Sunday 26 May. Both the Antwerpian fleet led by Marnix Saint-Aldegonde and the Holland-Zeeland fleet led by Count Hohenlohe launched a coordinated attack on the dike. The rebels initially captured vast portions of the dike and started piercing it in several locations. Eventually, an opening was made that was large enough for a relief ship to pass through and make its way to Antwerp, on which were Marnix and Hohenlohe. Alexander Farnese was at his headquarters in Beveren when the attack began and the roar of cannons woke him whereupon he rushed to the battle. He assessed the critical nature of the situation and immediately set to reversing the tide. Seven hours after the start of the attack, he did just that by putting artillery in place and using blocks of pikemen. The battle went on so long that the ocean's tide shifted causing many of the rebel ships to run aground. The Holland-Zeeland ships drifted with the tide out to sea leaving the Antwerpians to their fate. Of the roughly 4,000 soldiers the rebels engaged in this enterprise, nearly half perished. Though Parma put even more effort into reinforcing the dike, it was unnecessary as this bloody defeat put an end to any effective resistance.

=== The End of the War ===
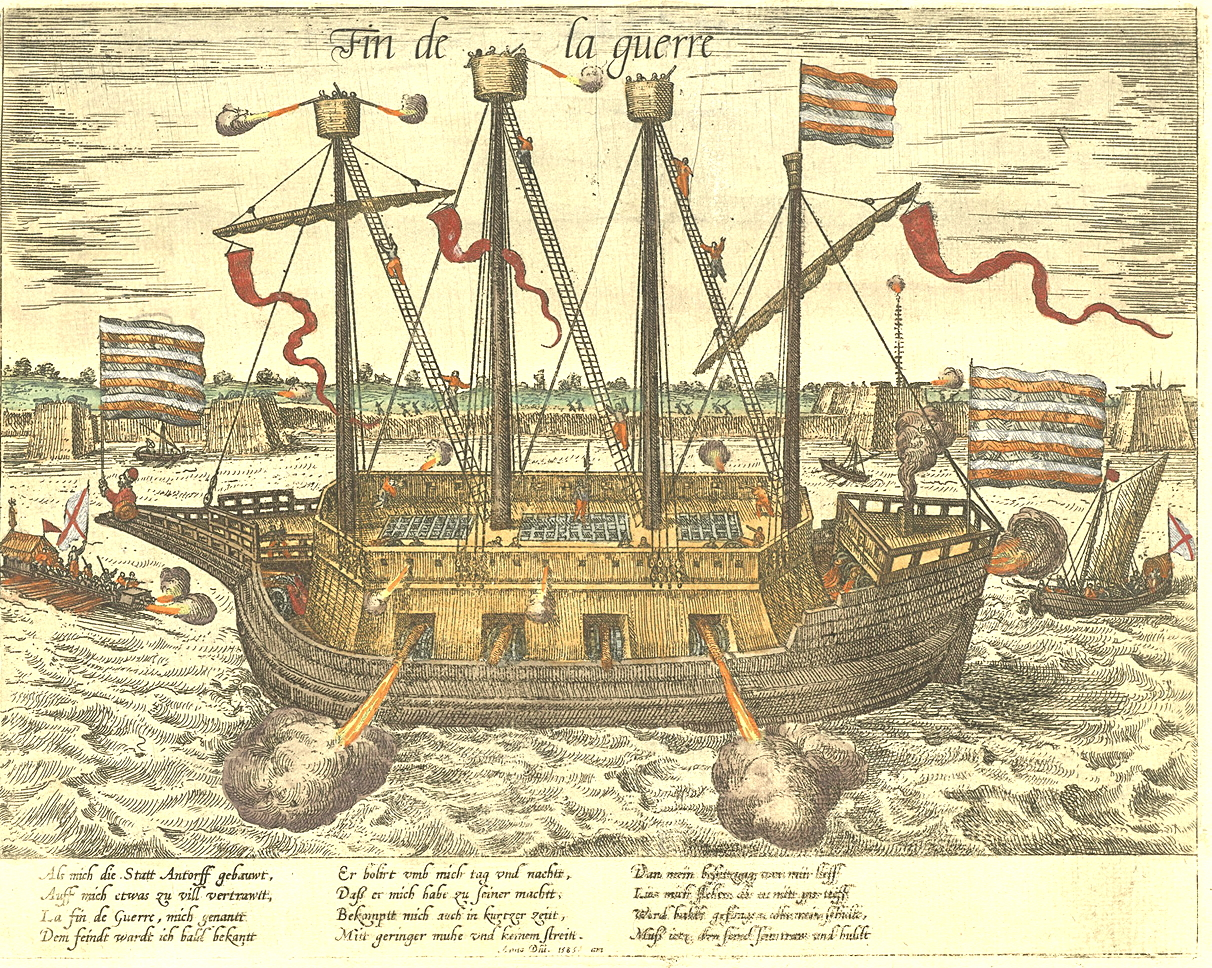
Dutch Finis Belli, a fortified ship meant to break the Spanish blockade.

After the battle, Alexander Farnese noticed a group of Antwerpian ships stationed around one enormous vessel which turned out to be a floating battery, intended to attack the Spanish forts and the bridge over the Scheldt. It had four masts, three of which were topped with bullet-proof crow's nests where musketeers were stationed, its flanks were equipped with 20 large cannons and numerous small and medium pieces, and its hull was encased in cork and empty barrels wrapped in oakum to make it unsinkable. It could accommodate 500 musketeers. This was another Giambelli invention called the Finis Belli ("End of War"), into which they put great hope but the mission failed. The ship was simply too big and unwieldy. It was an expensive abject failure.

The capture of the End of War further disheartened the Antwerpians leaving the impression that there was no way to defeat Parma. In the end the Dutch abandoned their efforts, considering Antwerp a lost cause.

== Surrender ==
Being cut off as they were and with supplies running low, famine was taking its toll. The city's Catholics energetically demanded that negotiations with Farnese commence. These lengthy negotiations were conducted by Marnix in the Spanish headquarters at the Singelberg in Beveren and on 17 August he signed the surrender of the city.

After the siege, the Dutch fleet on the river Scheldt was kept in position, blocking the city's access to the sea and cutting it off from international trade. Parma stationed experienced Castilian troops within Antwerp to make sure the city would not fall into enemy hands. The moderateness of Parma's demands and the behaviour of his troops were a complete surprise given the bloodiness of the siege and the rampage of 1576. Parma issued strict orders not to sack the city. The Spanish troops behaved impeccably, and Antwerp's Protestant population was given four years to settle their affairs before leaving.

Some returned to Roman Catholicism but many moved north and ended what had been a golden century for the city. Of the pre-siege population of 100,000 people, only 40,000 remained. Many of Antwerp's skilled tradesmen were included in the Protestant migration to the north, laying the commercial foundation for the subsequent "Dutch Golden Age" of the northern United Provinces. Although the city returned to prosperity, the Dutch blockade of commercial shipping in the Scheldt remained in place and prevented the city recovering its former glory. The blockade was maintained for the next two centuries and was an important and traumatic element in the history of relations between the Netherlands and what was to become Belgium.

== Bibliography ==
- Van der Essen, Leon (2020a). Alessandro Farnese: Prince of Parma: Governor-General of the Netherlands (1545–1592): v. I, trsl. & ed. by André Marek y Villarino de Brugge. Los Angeles: MJV Enterprises ltd. inc. ISBN 979-8687255998.
- Van der Essen, Leon (2020b). Alessandro Farnese: Prince of Parma: Governor-General of the Netherlands (1545–1592): v. II, trsl. & ed. by André Marek y Villarino de Brugge. Los Angeles: MJV Enterprises, ltd., inc. ISBN 979-8687563130.
- Van der Essen, Leon (2020c). Alessandro Farnese: Prince of Parma: Governor-General of the Netherlands (1545–1592): v. III, trsl. & ed. by André Marek y Villarino de Brugge. Los Angeles: MJV Enterprises, ltd., inc. ISBN 979-8688759655.
- Van der Essen, Leon (2020d). Alessandro Farnese: Prince of Parma: Governor-General of the Netherlands (1545–1592): The Siege of Antwerp, v. IV, trsl. & ed. by André Marek y Villarino de Brugge. Los Angeles: MJV Enterprises, ltd., inc. ISBN 979-8689543123.
- Van der Essen, Leon (2020e). Alessandro Farnese: Prince of Parma: Governor-General of the Netherlands (1545–1592): v. V, trsl. & ed. by André Marek y Villarino de Brugge. Los Angeles: MJV Enterprises, ltd., inc. ISBN 979-8689560397.
- Van der Essen, Leon (2021). Alessandro Farnese: Prince of Parma: Governor-General of the Netherlands (1545–1592): Addendum, trsl. & ed. by André Marek y Villarino de Brugge (Revised ed.). Los Angeles: MJV Enterprises, ltd., inc. ISBN 979-8848038859.
- Van Houtte, Jan, ed. (1952). Algemene geschiedenis der Nederlanden: De tachtigjarige oorlog 1567–1609. W. De Haan.
