= Eighty Years' War, 1566–1572 =

First phase of the Eighty Years' War

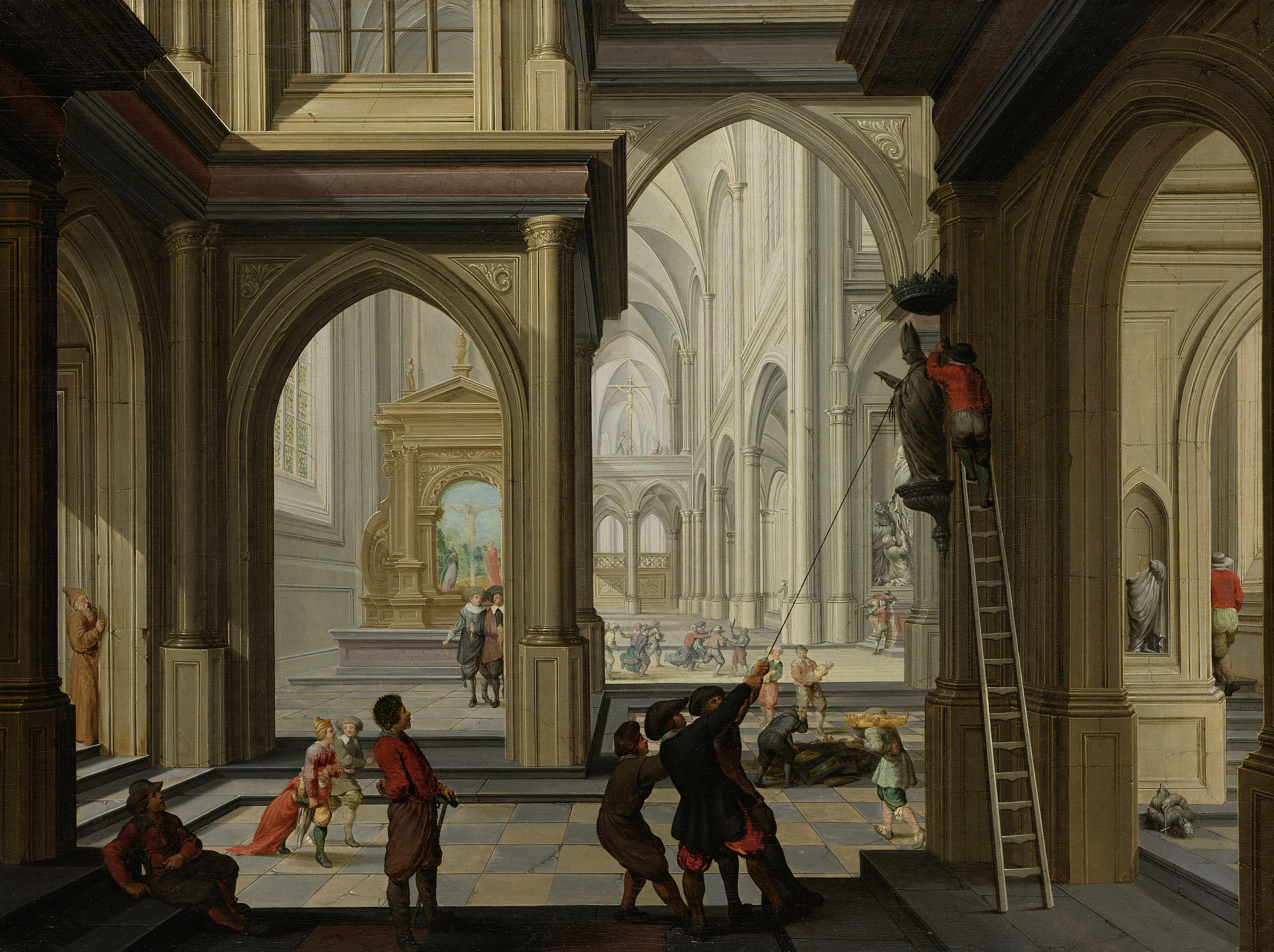
The Beeldenstorm or Iconoclastic Fury was a more or less organised destruction of Catholic sacred objects which swept through the Habsburg Netherlands' churches in 1566. 1630 painting by Dirck van Delen

The period between the start of the Beeldenstorm in August 1566 until early 1572 (before the Capture of Brielle on 1 April 1572) contained the first events of a series that would later be known as the Eighty Years' War between the Spanish Empire and disparate groups of rebels in the Habsburg Netherlands. (Note: "...the starting phase of the Revolt in Zeeland. We label the 1566–1572 period as the strike up to the Revolt: years in which the resistance against central authority, grown out to a rebellion, began to powerfully manifest itself.") Some of the first pitched battles and sieges between radical Calvinists and Habsburg governmental forces took place in the years 1566–1567, followed by the arrival and government takeover by Fernando Álvarez de Toledo, 3rd Duke of Alba (simply known as "Alba" or "Alva") with an army of 10,000 Spanish and Italian soldiers. Next, an ill-fated invasion by the most powerful nobleman of the Low Countries, the exiled but still-Catholic William "the Silent" of Orange, failed to inspire a general anti-government revolt. Although the war seemed over before it got underway, in the years 1569–1571, Alba's repression grew severe, and opposition against his regime mounted to new heights and became susceptible to rebellion.

Although virtually all historians place the start of the war somewhere in this period, there is no historical consensus on which exact event should be considered to have begun the war. Consequently, there is no agreement whether the war really lasted exactly eighty years. For this and other reasons, some historians have endeavoured to replace the name "Eighty Years' War" with "Dutch Revolt", but there is also no consensus either to which period the term "Dutch Revolt" should apply (be it the prelude to the war, the initial stage(s) of the war, or the entire war).

== Origins ==
The origins of the Eighty Years' War are complicated, and have been a source of disputes amongst historians for centuries.

The Habsburg Netherlands emerged as a result of the territorial expansion of the Burgundian State in the 14th and 15th centuries. Upon extinction of the Burgundian State in 1477/1482, these lands were inherited by the House of Habsburg, whose Charles V became both King of Spain (Note: Constitutionally, the Crowns of Castile and Aragon would not be united into the Kingdom of Spain until the 1707–1716 Nueva Planta decrees, and Charles formally reigned as Charles I of Castile and Aragon (sometimes informally called "Spain"). But in historiography, he is more commonly known as Emperor Charles V.) and Holy Roman Emperor. By conquering the rest of what would become the "Seventeen Provinces" during the Guelders Wars (1502–1543), and seeking to combine these disparate regions into a single political entity, Charles aspired to counter the Protestant Reformation and keep all his subjects obedient to the Catholic Church.

King Philip II of Spain, in his capacity as sovereign of Habsburg Netherlands, continued the Counter-Reformation and centralisation policies of his father Charles V. Resistance grew among the moderate nobility and population (both Catholic and dissenting) of the Netherlands. (Note: Unless otherwise indicated, "Netherlands" and "Netherlandish" refer here to the entire area of the Habsburg Netherlands and its inhabitants (including modern Belgium, Luxembourg and parts of northern France, but excluding areas such as the Principality of Liège), whereas "Dutch Republic" and "Dutch" will refer to the country, currently known as the Netherlands, and its inhabitants.) This mood first led to peaceful protests (as from the Compromise of Nobles), but the summer of 1566 erupted in violent protests by Calvinists, known as the iconoclastic fury, or (Dutch: Beeldenstorm) across the Netherlands. The Governor of the Habsburg Netherlands, Margaret of Parma, as well as lower authorities, feared insurrection and made further concessions to the Calvinists (such as designation of churches for Calvinist worship), but in December 1566 and early 1567 the first actual battles between Calvinist rebels and Habsburg governmental forces took place, in what would become known as the Eighty Years' War.

== Events and developments ==
=== Beeldenstorm (August–November 1566) ===
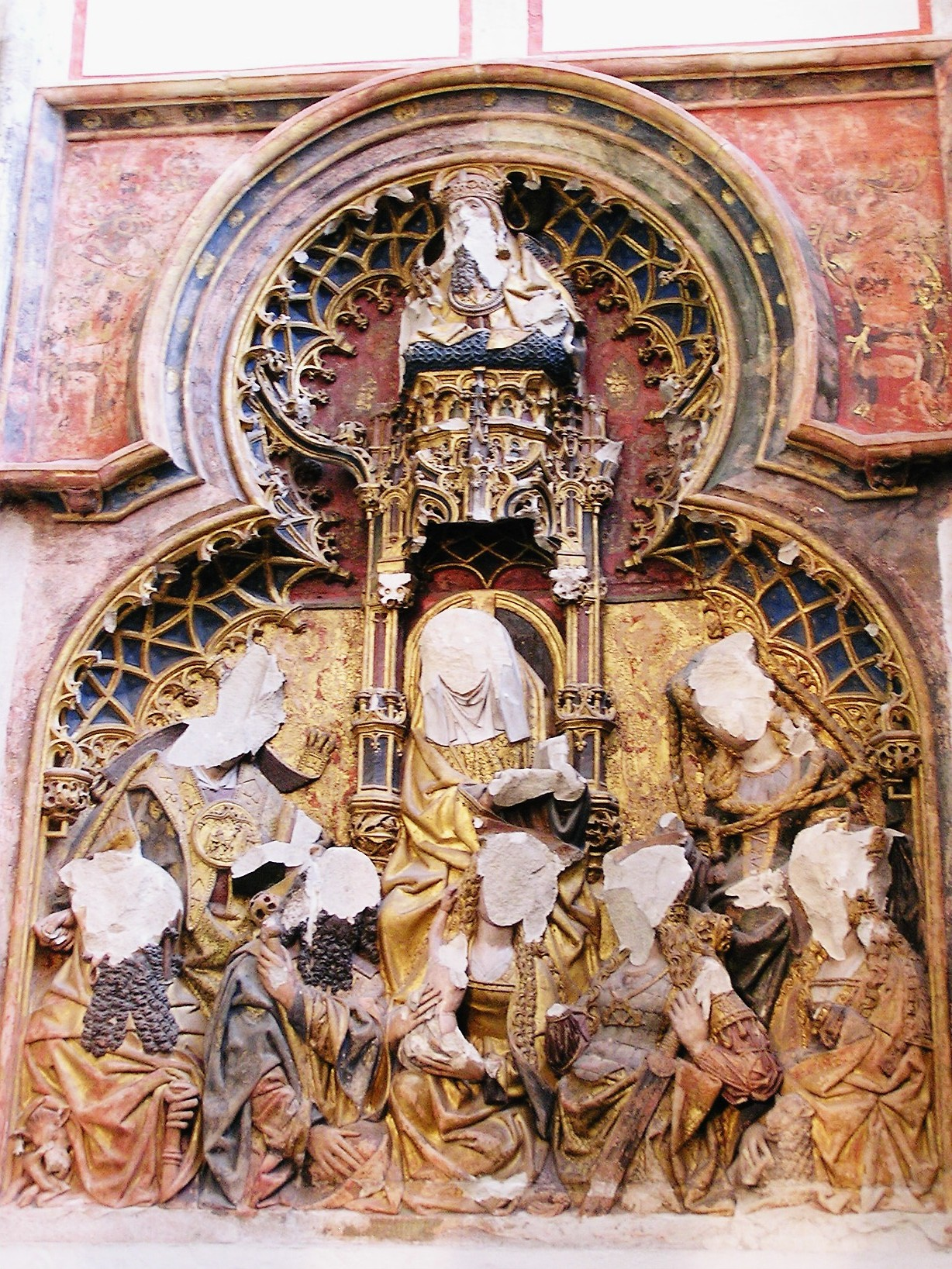
Relief statues in St. Martin's Cathedral, Utrecht, attacked in Reformation iconoclasm in the 16th century.

The atmosphere in the Netherlands was tense due to preaching of Calvinist leaders, hunger after the bad harvest of 1565, and economic difficulties due to the Northern Seven Years' War. The Compromise of Nobles led to the lesser nobility of the Habsburg Netherlands offering a petition to governor-general Margaret of Parma on 5 April 1566 to moderate the placards against heresy which were used for persecuting Protestants. One of her aides supposedly insulted the nobles by calling them gueux, French for "beggars"; this word evolved to Dutch geuzen which the nobles and other dissidents would soon reappropriate as a badge of pride. On 9 April, the duchess decided to temporarily suspend them and await further instructions from king Philip II of Spain on what to do, but suspension of the placards emboldened the Protestants. Some returned from exile. Calvinists started to organise open-air sermons (Dutch: hagepreken, "hedge-sermons") outside the city walls of many cities. Though these meetings were peaceful, their size alone caused anxiety for the authorities, especially as some of the people attending bore arms. Then, the situation deteriorated rapidly. On 1 August 1566, 2,000 armed Calvinists tried to force entry to the walled town of Veurne, but they failed. They were led by Sebastiaan Matte, who was a hatmaker by trade, but turned into a Calvinist preacher. He and other Calvinist weavers from the industrial area around Ypres such as Jacob de Buzere then started attacking churches and destroying religious statuary in western Flanders. On 10 August 1566, their first target was a monastery church at Steenvoorde in Flanders (now in Northern France), which was sacked by a mob led by Sebastiaan Matte. This incident was followed by similar riots elsewhere in Flanders, and before long the Netherlands had become the scene of the Beeldenstorm. This iconoclastic movement was planned and organised by prominent Calvinists, who supervised the actions of men (who had no property themselves) in storming churches and other religious buildings to desecrate and destroy church art and all kinds of decorative fittings over most of the country. The number of actual statue-breakers appears to have been relatively small, and the exact backgrounds of the movement are debated, but in general local authorities did not rein in the vandalism. The actions of the iconoclasts drove the nobility into two camps, with Orange and other grandees opposing the movement and others, notably Hendrick van Brederode, supporting it.

=== First battles and repression (December 1566 – March 1567) ===
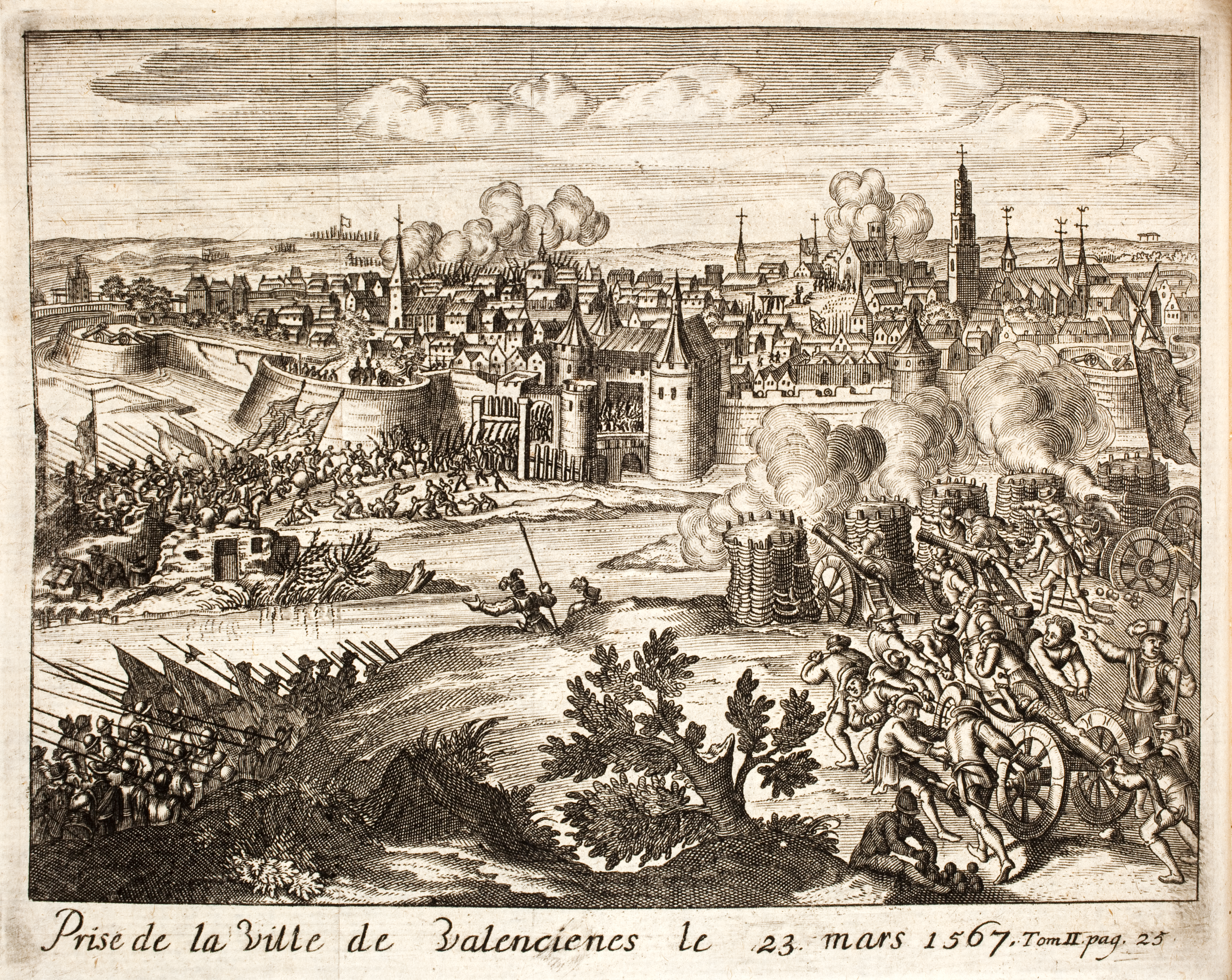
The Siege of Valenciennes (1567) portrayed in Famiano Strada's De bello belgico decades duae (reprint 1727)

The authorities at first did not react. The central government was especially disturbed by the fact that in many cases the civic militias refused to intervene. This seemed to portend insurrection. Margaret, and also authorities at lower levels, feared insurrection and made further concessions to the Calvinists, such as designating certain churches for Calvinist worship. Some provincial stadtholders used force to confront the unrest, foremost Philip of Noircarmes of Hainaut, who suppressed the revolt of the Calvinists led by Guido de Bres during the Siege of Valenciennes (6 December 1566 – 23 March 1567). After the parties could not reach a compromise, and Valenciennes refused to accept a royal garrison, the city was declared in a state of rebellion on 14 December 1566. Rebel attempts to relieve Valenciennes were crushed in the Battle of Wattrelos (27 December 1566) and the Battle of Lannoy (29 December 1566). For his part as stadtholder of Holland and Zeeland, William of Orange took decisive action to quell the disturbances.

Other noblemen attempted a more conciliatory approach. After the Beeldenstorm reached the city of Tournai on 23 August 1566, the Calvinists (who claimed to constitute three fourths of Tournai's population) demanded their own church buildings. Margaret of Parma dispatched Philip de Montmorency, Count of Horn to restore order, and he sought to achieve this through a kind of religious peace, including allowing the Calvinists to build their own churches. Margaret of Parma and king Philip resented him for this, and they recalled Horne. In January 1567, Philip of Noircarmes retook Tournai.

On 13 March 1567 at the Battle of Oosterweel, Calvinists under John of St. Aldegonde were defeated by a royalist army and all rebels summarily executed. Orange prevented the citizens of nearby Antwerp to come to the rebels' aid. Margaret of Parma sent Lamoral, Count of Egmont and Philippe III de Croÿ, Duke of Aarschot to Valenciennes to negotiate with the rebels, but the talks broke down. A cannonade of the city forced the Calvinist rebels to surrender, and on 23 March (Palm Sunday) Noircarmes entered Valenciennes. Protestant leaders Peregrin de la Grange and Guido de Bres initially escaped, but were soon captured, and were both hanged on 31 May 1567. Due to Valenciennes' capitulation, other Calvinist strongholds quickly surrendered.

=== Arrival and takeover of Alba (April 1567 – June 1568) ===
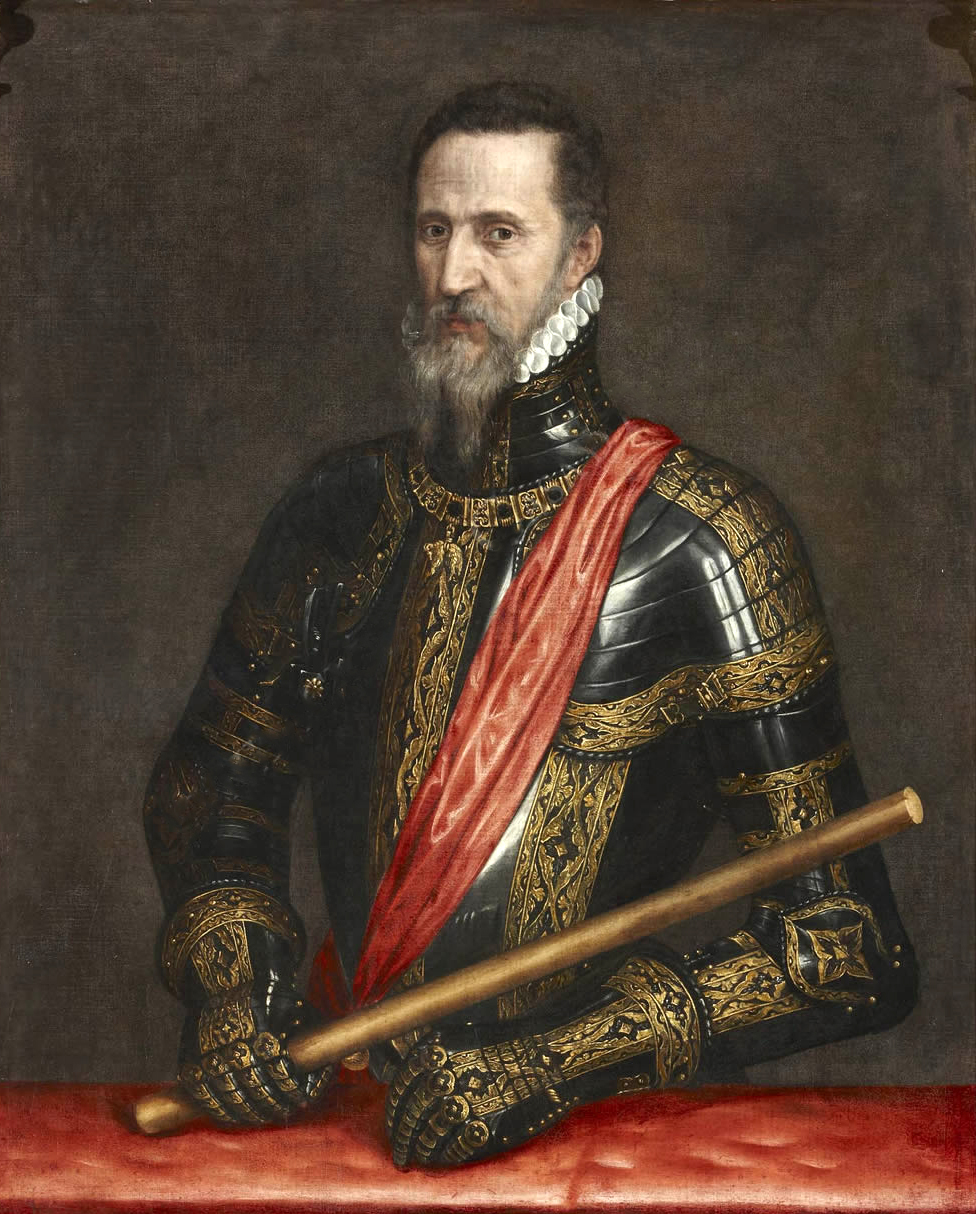
The Duke of Alba, painted by Antonis Mor in 1549

In April 1567, Margaret reported to her brother Philip II that order had been restored. However, news travelled slowly and the court in Madrid had received a rather exaggerated impression of the severity of the situation. Even before he answered the petition by the nobles, Philip believed he had lost control in the troublesome Netherlands, and came to the conclusion that there was no other option than to send an army to suppress the rebellion. In September 1566, Philip had decided to travel himself to the Netherlands to restore order, but debate among the two factions at the Spanish court, led by the Duke of Alba and the Prince of Éboli, about the advisability of this journey grew fierce. Eventually it was decided to send an army from Italy under the command of Alba. Margaret's emissary arrived at the court on 17 April 1567, the same day that Alba and his army departed on their mission from Cartagena, Spain by ship, too late to prevent the fateful intervention.

Alba's army of Spanish and Italian mercenaries reached the Netherlands by way of the Spanish Road, passing Thionville in Luxemburg on 3 August 1567. On 22 August 1567, Fernando Álvarez de Toledo, 3rd Duke of Alba, marched into Brussels at the head of 10,000 troops. Over the course of six years, the army grew to 67,000 men. Alba was supposed to act as military captain-general, while Margaret would remain in office as civil governor-general. Alba took harsh measures, and rapidly established a special court (Raad van Beroerten or Council of Troubles) on 5 September 1567 to put anyone who opposed the king in some way on trial. The Council conducted a campaign of repression of suspected heretics and people deemed guilty of the (already extinguished) insurrection. The Council used its power to override the civilian authorities in arresting suspects. Alba considered himself the direct representative of Philip in the Netherlands and therefore frequently bypassed Margaret of Parma, the king's half-sister who had been appointed governor of the Netherlands. He made use of her to lure back some of the fugitive nobles, notably the counts of Egmont and Horn, causing her to resign office in September 1567. Rather than working with Margaret, Alba took over command and Margaret resigned in protest.

Alba gives the last honors to Counts Egmont and Hoorne. 19th century paiting by Louis Gallait.

Alba thereafter was in sole command. Many high-ranking officials were arrested on various pretexts, among whom the Counts of Egmont and Horn. The victims of the repression were found in all social strata. A total of about 9,000 people were eventually convicted by the council, though only 1,000 were actually executed, as many managed to go into exile. One of the latter was Orange, who forfeited his extensive possessions in the Netherlands, like most of the people being proscribed. The victims were not necessarily only Protestants. For instance, the Counts of Egmont and Horne, executed for treason on 5 June 1568, protested their Catholic orthodoxy on the scaffold.

Egmont and Horne were arrested for high treason, condemned, and a year later beheaded on the Grand-Place in Brussels. Egmont and Horne had been Catholic nobles, loyal to the King of Spain until their deaths. The reason for their execution was that Alba considered they had been treasonous to the king in their tolerance to Protestantism. Their executions, ordered by a Spanish noble, provoked outrage. More than one thousand people were executed in the following months. The large number of executions led the court to be nicknamed the "Blood Court" in the Netherlands, and Alba to be called the "Iron Duke". Rather than pacifying the Netherlands, these measures helped to fuel the unrest.

=== Opposition in exile (April 1567 – April 1568) ===
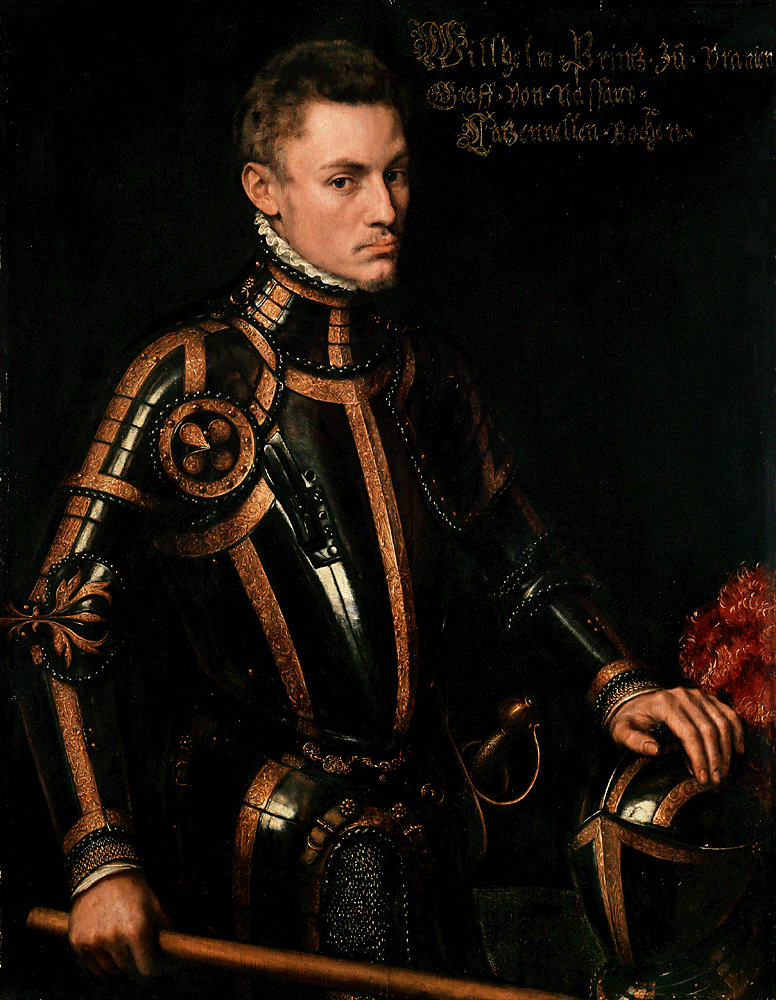
William of Orange painted by Anthonis Mor around 1554

The many exiles found asylum in the few areas in neighboring countries that welcomed Calvinists, like the Huguenot areas in France, England, and Emden or Wesel in Germany. Many were ready to join an armed fight, but the fate of the rebels at Oosterweel had shown that irregular forces did not stand a chance against well-disciplined troops. A better organised effort was needed to lead such an effort, and Orange was uniquely well-placed. As a sovereign prince of the Holy Roman Empire (Note: The principality of Orange in present-day France at the time was an independent fief of the Empire.) Orange was in a sense the equal of Philip, in his capacity of Count of Holland, for instance. Orange was therefore entirely within his rights to make war on Philip (or, as he for the moment preferred, on Philip's "bad advisor" Alba). This was important in a diplomatic context as it legitimised Orange's efforts to hire mercenaries in the principalities of his German "colleagues," and enabled him to issue letters of marque to the many Calvinist seamen who had embarked on a career of piracy from economic desperation. Such letters elevated the latter, the so-called Sea Beggars, to the status of privateers, which enabled the authorities in neutral countries, like the England of Elizabeth I, to accommodate them without legal embarrassment. (Note: As a matter of fact, the English probably welcomed the opportunity to obtain cargo and ships at fire-sale prices, when the privateers came to dispose of their prizes; the arrangement was mutually beneficial.) Orange's temporary abode in Dillenburg therefore became the command center for plans to invade the Netherlands from several directions at once. Orange went into exile in his ancestral castle in Dillenburg, which became the centre for plans to invade the Netherlands. (Note: Orange was a sovereign prince of the Holy Roman Empire and as such could legally make war on his "colleague" king Philip, in his capacity of sovereign of the several entities of the same Empire that together constituted the Habsburg Netherlands.)

Other nobles decided to stay, but remained critical of the royal government. Philippe III de Croÿ, the Duke of Aarschot, had been Orange's rival before Alba's 1567 arrival, and he became the de facto leader of his majesty's loyal opposition in the years thereafter (1567–1576). It was not until the Spanish Fury that their interests firmly coincided, and Orange and Aarschot became allies in their joint rebellion against the king.

=== Orange's first invasion (April–November 1568) ===
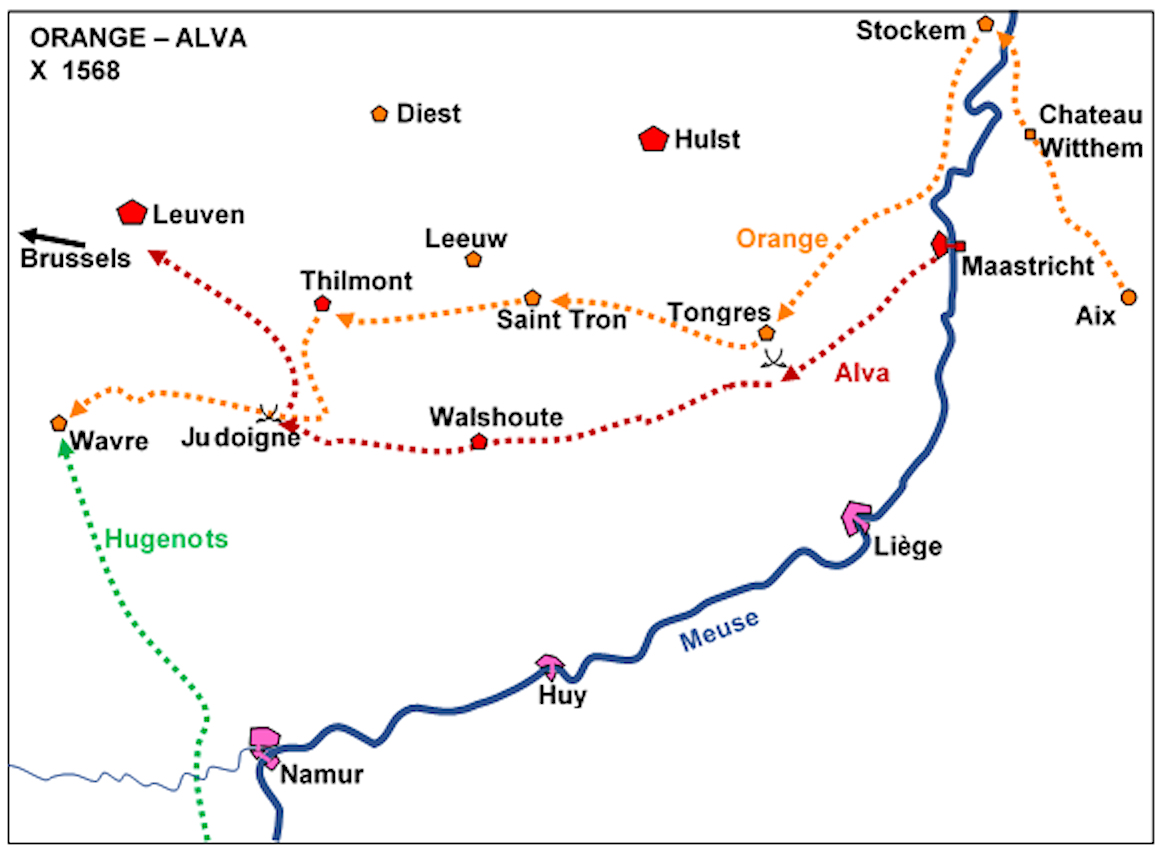
Campaign map of the Prince of Orange vs the Duke of Alba, October 1568

Louis of Nassau, Orange's brother, crossed into Groningen from East Friesland with a mercenary army of Landsknechten, and defeated a small royalist force at Heiligerlee on 23 May 1568. Two months later, Louis's mercenary forces were smashed at the Battle of Jemmingen. Shortly thereafter, a Sea Beggars naval squadron defeated a royalist fleet in a naval battle on the Ems. However, a Huguenot army invading Artois was pushed back into France and then annihilated by the forces of Charles IX of France in June. Orange marched into Brabant, but with money running out he could not maintain his mercenary army and had to retreat.

=== 1569–1571 ===
Philip was suffering from the high cost of his war against the Ottoman Empire, and ordered Alba to fund his armies from taxes levied in the Netherlands. (Note: Parker (2004) discusses the financial difficulties the Spanish Crown almost continually encountered, when it often had to fight several wars at the same time as the war in the Netherlands, which forced it to declare bankruptcy several times; see Parker, ch. 6, Financial Resources.) Alba went against the States General of the Netherlands by imposing sales taxes by decree on 31 July 1571. Alba commanded local governments to collect the unpopular taxes, which alienated even loyal lower governments from the central government.

== Bibliography ==
- DuPlessis, Robert S. (2002). Lille and the Dutch Revolt: Urban Stability in an Era of Revolution, 1500–1582. Cambridge: Cambridge University Press. p. 392. ISBN 9780521894173.
- Israel, Jonathan (1995). The Dutch Republic: Its Rise, Greatness, and Fall 1477–1806. Oxford: Clarendon Press. ISBN 0-19-873072-1.
- Kamen, Henry (2005). Spain, 1469–1714: a society of conflict (3rd ed.). Harlow, United Kingdom: Pearson Education. ISBN 0-582-78464-6.
- van der Lem, Anton (1995). "Het verhaal van de Opstand. Hoofdstuk 5: De scheiding in de Nederlanden". De Opstand in de Nederlanden (1555–1648) (in Dutch). Uitgeverij Kosmos / Leiden University. Archived from the original on 18 September 2011.
- Mulder, Liek; Doedens, Anne; Kortlever, Yolande (2008). Geschiedenis van Nederland, van prehistorie tot heden. Baarn: HBuitgevers. p. 288. ISBN 9789055746262.
- Parker, Geoffrey (2004). The Army of Flanders and the Spanish Road 1567–1659. Second edition. Cambridge University Press. ISBN 978-0-521-54392-7. paperback
- Rooze-Stouthamer, Clasina Martina (2009). De opmaat tot de Opstand: Zeeland en het centraal gezag (1566–1572) (in Dutch). Uitgeverij Verloren. ISBN 9789087040918.
- Tracy, J.D. (2008). The Founding of the Dutch Republic: War, Finance, and Politics in Holland 1572–1588. Oxford University Press. ISBN 978-0-19-920911-8.
