= Battle of Lannoy =

1566 battle in Europe

- Part of the Eighty Years’ War
Date	29 December 1566
Location	Lannoy, County of Flanders, Spanish Netherlands (present-day France) 50°40′N 3°12′E
Result	Spanish victory

Belligerents
Dutch rebels	(Spain) Spanish Empire

Commanders and leaders
Pierre Cornaille	(Spain) Philip of Noircarmes

Strength
3,000 infantry	?

Casualties and losses
700–2,600	?

The Battle of Lannoy took place on 29 December 1566 between an army of Geuzen and a Spanish force. It was one of the first battles of the Dutch Revolt.

== Battle ==
Two days after another Geuzen army, under Jan Denys, had been defeated at Wattrelos by Maximilian Vilain, Philip of Noircarmes, stadtholder of Hainaut, attacked a large force of Calvinists under Pierre Cornaille at Lannoy. Both Denys and Cornaille had been moving to lift the Siege of Valenciennes.

Noircarmes fell on the Protestants and broke their formation in the first attack, after which the rest tried to flee. More than half were killed or chased into the nearby river. According to Catholics 2,600 died, however, La Barre recounted only “700 to 800 Huguenots” fallen. Still, this defeat was a heavy one for the South-Dutch rebels, many times heavier than Wattrelos.

A few days later Doornik was conquered by the Spanish and on 24 March 1567 Valenciennes surrendered to the Spanish, after a third relief attempt had been defeated at Oosterweel.
