= Siege of Valenciennes =

Siege of Valenciennes may refer to:

- Siege of Valenciennes (1567), a siege during the Eighty Years' War
- Siege of Valenciennes (1656), a siege during the Franco-Spanish War
- Siege of Valenciennes (1676–1677), a siege during the Franco-Dutch War
- Siege of Valenciennes (1793), a siege during the Flanders Campaign
