= Anna van Egmont the Elder =

Noblewoman

Anna van Egmont
- Born: 1504; IJsselstein
- Died: 1574 (aged 69–70)

Anna van Egmont the Elder (1504–1574) was the mother of executed counts Horn and Montigny.

== Biography ==
She was born in IJsselstein as the daughter of the Dutch stadtholder of Guelders, Count Floris van Egmont, and Margaretha van Bergen (ca. 1481-ca. 1551). Anna van Egmont married the first time on 26-8-1523 to Joseph baron van Montmorency (ca. 1500-ca. 1530), and they had 4 children. After his death she married the second time on 6-12-1530 in Weert to Count Jan van Horne (1470/75-1540), who had been in line to become Prince-Bishop of Liege, but quit religion in order to secure an heir for his family after the death of his brother. Unfortunately, this marriage remained childless, but he received permission to make his oldest stepson Philip de Montmorency become Count of Horn upon his death on the condition he marry Walburgis van Nieuwenaer, which he did. Anna's daughter Maria married in 1562 in Weert with Peter Ernst van Mansfeld, who later served the Duke of Parma, and daughter Eleonora married Antoine II de Lalaing, Count of Hoogstraten, who died 11 December 1568 as the result of a battle injury suffered while serving the army of William of Orange. Anna's namesake, her niece Anna van Egmont the Younger, had been William of Orange's first wife who bore him three children.

According to her biographer Maria Luyten, a nun of the Catholic Witte Nonnen located on the Maasstraat in Weert, both Anna van Egmont and her daughter-in-law were instrumental in promoting the Lutheran faith in the area around Weert. From 1566 they were to be seen in the company of a geuzen-paap or "beggar pope". When the Duke of Alva arrived in the North to defend the interests of the Inquisition, Anna's son Philip was seized along with Lamoral and they were beheaded 5 June 1568 in Brussels. Soon after this Anna and Walburgis fled to Cologne, where they began proceedings to recover their seized goods and also secure the release of Anna's son Floris of Montmorency who was in prison in Simancas.

In 1570 Floris was strangled and little is known of Anna after that, but it is assumed that she died in 1574.
