= Letters from the Segovia Woods =

The Letters from the Segovia Woods denote two sets of letters Philip II of Spain sent to his Regent Margaret of Parma, rejecting requests to abolish the ordinances outlawing heresy in the Habsburg Netherlands on 17 and 20 October 1565, and 31 July 1566. His intransigence in this matter contributed to the outbreak of the Eighty Years' War.

== Background ==
Philip had continued the policy of repression of heretics instituted by his father, Charles V with great vigor. However, this policy met with mounting opposition in the Netherlands. In 1565 the Council of State therefore sent its prominent member, Lamoral, Count of Egmont to the Spanish court to personally plead for a relaxation of these policies. He did not receive an immediate answer.

At the time Philip divided his time between several places in Spain (the construction of El Escorial had only recently been started). One of his favorite houses was La Casa del Bosque de Segovia, a mansion in the woods near Segovia. Of course, his voluminous correspondence used this place in the dateline when he sojourned there. There are therefore thousands of "letters from the Segovia woods" extant, but the two sets concerning the religious-policy question he sent subsequent to Egmont's visit from this place have become associated with their dateline in Dutch and English historiography.

== Developments in 1565 and 1566 ==
The two letters from October 1565, which arrived in Brussels at the beginning of November, were actually replies to Margaret's letters from July 1565, in which she made a number of requests concerning the relaxation of the Inquisition and the treatment of certain Anabaptists who had been convicted and sentenced, but for whom she requested mercy. In all cases he rejected her requests. There is a certain annoyed undertone in these letters as he refers to earlier letters, in which, he thought, he had made his orders already quite clear.

The letters did little to calm down the unrest in the Netherlands. In December 1565 a group of nobles started a political movement, the Compromise of Nobles, in direct reaction to the letters. Also, on 24 January 1566, one of the leading members of the Council of State, the Prince of Orange, expressed his discontent with Philip's religious policies and threatened to resign. Matters came to a head when 400 members of the Compromise presented a petition to Margaret on 5 April 1566, again asking for relaxation of the ordinances against heresy.

Margaret then sent two members of the Council of State, the Marquis of Bergen and the Baron de Montigny, brother of the Count of Hoorn, to Spain with the petition to plead for a positive response. However, after having listened to these gentlemen, Philip indicated in a second set of letters from the Segovia Woods, dated 31 July 1566, that he saw no reason to relent. He also explicitly prohibited the convocation of the States General of the Netherlands as Margaret had advised.

== Aftermath ==
While awaiting Philip's reply to the petition, the government in Brussels had already suspended the enforcement of the ordinances. This had emboldened the Calvinists in the country (many of whom returned from exile because of the milder political climate) and they started to organize open-air religious meetings which attracted large crowds. Though initially peaceful, these eventually led to social unrest when Philip's reply had been received. In August and September, a wave of riotous attacks on churches, destroying religious art and fittings, the so-called Iconoclastic Fury or Dutch: Beeldenstorm went over much of the country and Calvinists seized power in a few cities, like Valenciennes. These insurrections motivated Philip to send over an army under the command of the Duke of Alba in 1567. His repressive measures ignited the Dutch Revolt.

== Sources ==
- Kossmann, E.H., Mellink, A.F. (1974) Texts concerning the revolt of the Netherlands. Cambridge University Press, ISBN 0-521-20014-8, ISBN 978-0-521-20014-1
