= Inquisition in the Netherlands =

Extension of the Papal Inquisition

The Inquisition in the Netherlands was an extension of the Papal Inquisition in the Netherlands, established during the reign of Charles V. Although it was widely believed at the time that the government intended to introduce the Spanish Inquisition into the Netherlands, the Inquisition in the Netherlands remained separate from that of Spain.

Apart from the short-lived attempt by Charles V to establish a special court for the pursuit of heretics in 1522 (possibly revived in 1550), there never was any scheme to establish a Holy Office of the sort known in Castile in the Netherlands.

— Duke (1997, p. 143)

On 23 April 1523, Charles V appointed Frans Van der Hulst the first inquisitor general of the Seventeen Provinces, an appointment ratified by Pope Adrian VI. He and his successors were empowered by the imperial edict to actively search out and rigorously punish all those guilty or even suspected of heresy, or of aiding a heretic in any way. He was appointed inquisitor for County of Flanders in 1545 and was in office until the operation of the inquisition was suspended in 1566. Between 1523 and 1566, more than 1,300 people were executed as heretics, far more relative to the overall population than, for instance, in France.

Before the death of Charles V, the Netherlands were mainly Catholic and thus the Inquisition did not have a very drastic impact on people's lives in general. However, with the rapid spread of Calvinism in the early years of the reign of his son, Philip II, its scope widened vastly. The Edicts of 1521 had banned all preaching or practice of the reformed religion, even in private dwellings, and this power was now brought into full swing. On 2 June 1545 Pieter Titelmans was appointed as Inquisitor.

The Inquisition in the Netherlands should be understood as an office held by individual, successive inquisitors rather than as a tribunal. Individual inquisitors were called upon as specialized judges in cases dealing with offending clerics. They were also involved in judicial procedures related to heresy but these were conducted by laymen, not the inquisitors. Inquisitors were often appointed ad hoc after the death of the previous holder of the function and there were not many of them in total.

== See also ==
- Martyrs Mirror
