= Battle of Wattrelos =

Spanish victory in the Eighty Years' War

- Part of the Eighty Years’ War
Date	27 December 1566
Location	Wattrelos, County of Flanders, Spanish Netherlands (present-day France) 50°42′N 3°13′E
Result	Spanish victory

Belligerents
Dutch rebels	(Spain) Spanish Empire

Commanders and leaders
Jan Denys	(Spain) Maximilian Vilain

Strength
200 infantry	150 infantry 50 cavalry

The Battle of Wattrelos at the Flemish (now French) town of Wattrelos on 27 December 1566 between a Calvinist rebel army (sometimes described as "Geuzen") and troops of the Spanish Netherlands government. It is sometimes considered as one of the first battles of the Eighty Years' War.

== Battle ==
The rebel army was composed of about 200 men from the sayetterie centre of Hondschoote and its surroundings in West Flanders. They were Calvinists, and their goal was to intervene in the Siege of Valenciennes, where their fellow Calvinists were beleaguered by governmental troops under Philip of Noircarmes.

Maximilian Vilain, baron of Rassenghien and since 1 June 1566 stadtholder of Walloon Flanders, learned that the rebels had arrived at Wattrelos, about fifteen kilometres northeast of Lille. He sent 50 light cavalry and 150 infantry in response. On 27 December, these governmental forces surprised the rebels. The rebels fled into a parish church, which Rassenghien's forces set on fire, so that many rebels burnt to death.

Two days later, on 29 December 1566, Noircarmes defeated another rebel force in the Battle of Lannoy, also north of Lille. In the night of 1 to 2 January 1567, Noircarmes' troops occupied Tournai and expelled the Calvinists there.

== Bibliography ==
- DuPlessis, Robert S. (2002). Lille and the Dutch Revolt: Urban Stability in an Era of Revolution, 1500–1582. Cambridge: Cambridge University Press. p. 392. ISBN 9780521894173.
- Anton van der Lem. "Wattrelos". dutchrevolt.leiden.edu (in Dutch). Universiteit Leiden. Archived from the original on 31 July 2022.
- Van der Wee, Herman (1969). "De economie als factor bij het begin van de opstand in de Zuidelijke Nederlanden door Herman van der Wee". BMGN: Low Countries Historical Review (in Dutch). 83. Royal Netherlands Historical Society: 15–32.
