= Floris of Montmorency =

Baron of Montigny

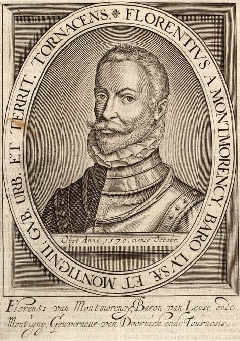
Floris of Montmorency by Hillebrant van Wouw I

Floris van Montmorency, baron of Montigny (?, 1528 – Simancas, 14 October 1570) was a noble and diplomat from the Spanish Netherlands.

He was born as the son of Jozef van Montmorency, Count of Nevele and Anna van Egmont the Elder, and was the younger brother of Philip de Montmorency, Count of Horn.

Floris had military training at the court of his relative Anne de Montmorency, Constable of France. He accompanied Emperor Charles V to Spain after his abdication. At his return, Floris became a Knight in the Order of the Golden Fleece with the support of William the Silent and against the wishes of Philip II of Spain. He was also appointed as Governor of the Tournaisis.

As the rest of the high nobility in Flanders, Floris was a strong opponent to Cardinal Granvelle.

In April 1566, he was sent by the Council of State with John IV of Glymes to Spain in a last attempt to avoid war. As Glymes was wounded on the leg before leaving, Floris travelled alone. When the Beeldenstorm raged across the Low Countries, Floris was arrested and kept in house arrest in the castle at Simancas. When Egmont and Horn were arrested in Brussels, Floris was also condemned to death by the Council of Troubles. Instead of returning him to the Low Countries for his sentence to be executed, Philip II of Spain had Floris strangled in secret despite the pleas of his new wife Anna of Austria to release Floris, and spread the rumour that he had died of disease.

== Sources ==
- Biography on dutchrevolt.leiden.edul
- Biographie Nationale de Belgique, s.v. "Florent de Montigny", vol. 15, kol.
