= Siege of Valenciennes (1566–1567) =

Spanish victory in the Eighty Years' War

- Part of the Eighty Years' War
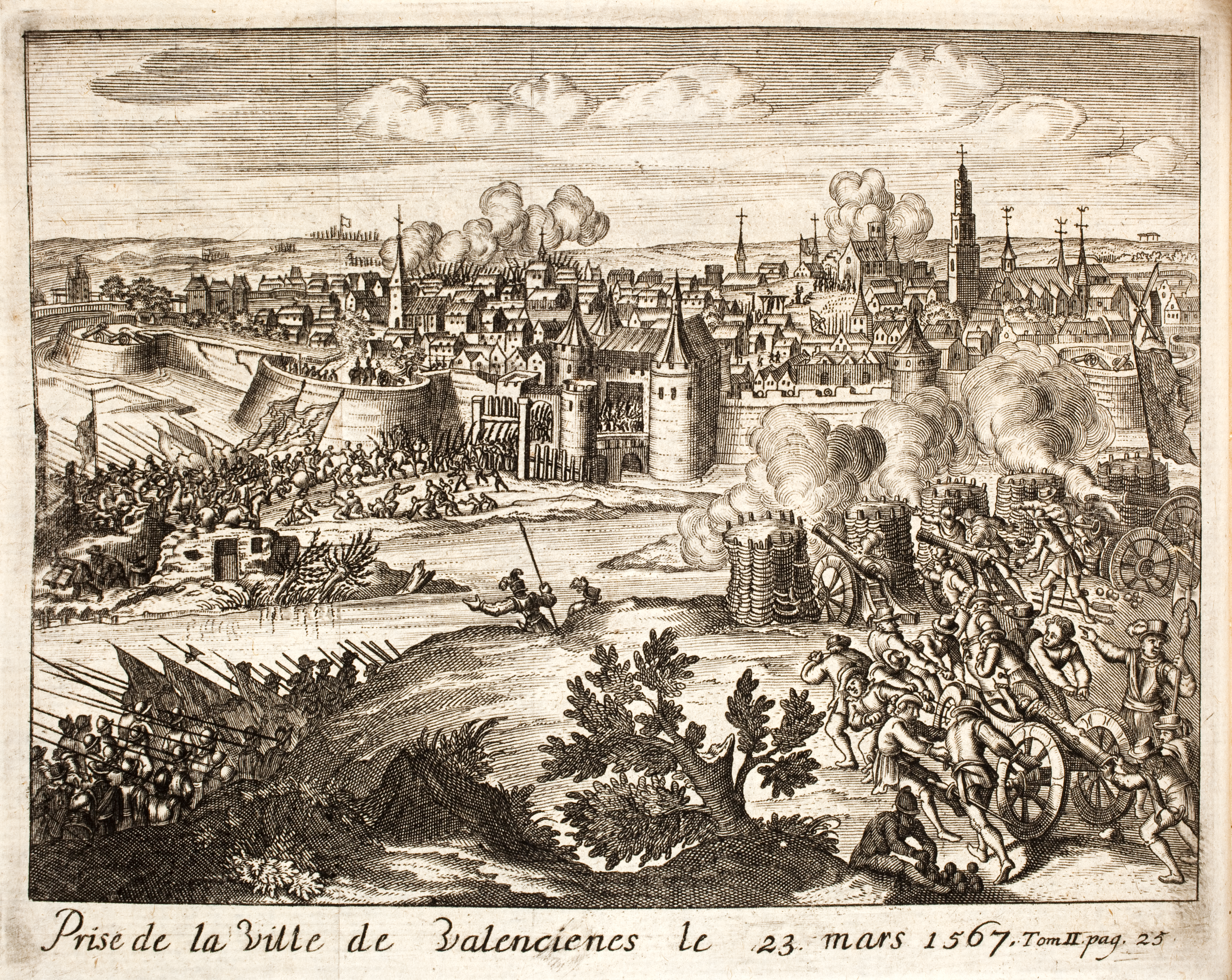
- Capture of Valenciennes from Famiano Strada's De Bello belgico decades duae (reprint 1727).
| Date | 14 December 1566 – 23 March 1567 |
| Location | Valenciennes, County of Hainaut, Spanish Netherlands (present-day France) 50°21′N 3°31′E |
| Result | Spanish victory |

Belligerents
| Dutch rebels | (Spain) Spanish Empire |

Commanders and leaders
| Pérégrin de La Grange; Guido de Brès | (Spain) Philip of Noircarmes |

The siege of Valenciennes took place between 14 December 1566 and 23 March 1567 at Valenciennes, then in the Spanish Netherlands. It is sometimes considered the first siege of the Eighty Years' War. Following the Beeldenstorm, which reached the city on 24 August 1566, Calvinists under the leadership of Pérégrin de La Grange and Guido de Brès (also called "Guy de Bray", the author of the 1561 Belgic Confession) fortified themselves within Valenciennes' walls. The acting stadtholder of Hainaut, Philip of Noircarmes, subdued the city after months of failed negotiations, starvation, and finally an artillery bombardment.

== Background ==
Valenciennes was one of the most important cities that fell to the Calvinists in 1566; even before the Beeldenstorm reached the city on 24 August 1566, the Prévost-le Comte had been driven out of the city; during the iconoclasm, the Catholic clergy were also expelled. Although the magistrate (the city council) was still Catholic, it did not dare to act against the will of the Reformed consistory, so that the Calvinists actually had power in Valenciennes. Under the leadership of the radical preachers Pérégrin de La Grange and Guido de Brès, especially the poor and textile workers were roused to lay down their work en masse, and come and listen to their sermons. The fanatical Calvinist preachers saw this as confirmation of their belief that all the people only wanted to hear God's Word, and so that the heavenly kingdom would surely soon come. Meanwhile, however, Valenciennes fell into an economic crisis because the industry had declined sharply after many textile labourers started listening to de La Grange and De Brès's preaching instead of working. But the two were not concerned with such practicalities as the economy, let alone the risk that the government would try to retake the city. Gilles le Clercq, who had served as general secretary of the Calvinist movement during the summer months, had come to Valenciennes in order to collect money for war preparations, but he was sent away by De Brès, who said he wasn't interested in that sort of thing.

== Encirclement ==
As acting stadtholder of Hainaut, Noircarmes opened negotiations with the magistrate of Valenciennes to restore order. Noircarmes demanded that the urban militias, who had sided with the Protestants during the Beeldenstorm, were disbanded and a garrison of governmental troops (Note: It is often presumed that these troops were Spanish mercenaries, but this is not correct. King Philip had commissioned Eric II, Duke of Brunswick-Lüneburg to recruit ten thousand German landsknechte and three thousand reiter. This was later augmented with two more foreign regiments and five native Netherlandish ones, among whom two of Walloons; Cf. Davies, pp. 531, 536.) would be placed in the city to maintain order. The Catholic magistrate would have liked to comply, but dared not to contradict the consistory; the Calvinists there stubbornly resisted letting in a garrison. Instead, the consistory ordered that the magistrate defend, improve, and fortify the city walls; as a fortress city, Valenciennes was quite defensible. Because the magistrate did not comply with his demands, Noircarmes declared the city in rebellion on 17 September 1566. In November, Noircarmes tried to prevent a (costly) siege by seeking to persuade governor-general Margaret of Parma to impose a trade blockade on the city. However, she did not want to go that far yet, and instructed Noircarmes to once again negotiate for a peaceful solution; when this failed once more, Noircarmes began to surround and cut off Valenciennes from the outside world in late November and early December. De la Grange succeeded on the night of 5 to 6 December 1566 to persuade the Assembly to (again) reject a royal garrison. Noircarmes' decision of 17 September to declare the city rebellious was finally confirmed by government placard on 14 December 1566, imposing a ban on Valenciennes. The rural population in the area was forbidden to trade or have any contact with the city, carrying weapons and holding armed gatherings was prohibited, and anyone violating these measures would be treated as an enemy of the king. This tightened the blockade, which increasingly took the form of a siege, although no artillery fire was employed yet.

== Siege ==
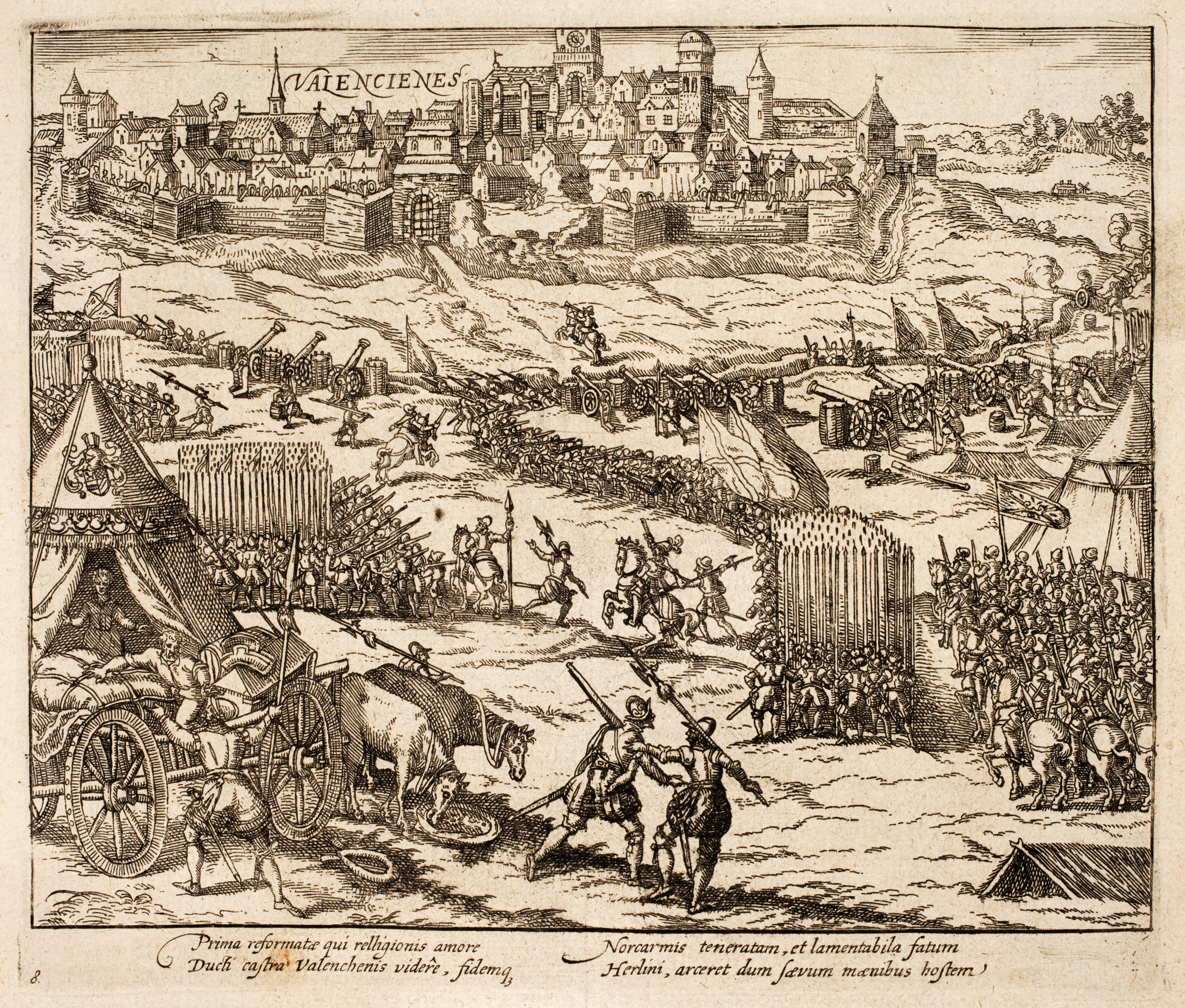
The capture of Valenciennes according to Pieter Bor's Nederlantsche oorloghen (1621).

Initially Noircarmes limited himself to encirlement without shelling to prevent bloodshed. A group of Calvinists led by Jan Denys tried to relieve Valenciennes, but it was defeated by Maximilian Vilain (lord of Rassenghien), commander of Lille, in the Battle of Wattrelos on 27 December 1566. Two days later another group of fighters lost to Noircarmes near Lannoy. Initially, the Calvinists only had the 300-strong urban militia, but they began arming the workers in late 1566. It is estimated by Kuttner (1949) that at least "far more than three hundred proletarians, and probably as many as two or three times as many [have] fought for the city." The Calvinist theocracy that was established in beleaguered Valenciennes has led historians to draw comparisons with the Anabaptist Münster rebellion (1534–1535), and Calvin's Geneva (1536–1564).

After the Protestant defeats at Wattrelos and Lannoy, the situation within the city became more serious, and Noircarmes increasingly isolated Valenciennes. When the stadtholder also occupied Tournai in the night of 1 to 2 January 1567 and expelled the Calvinists there, the rebellious Protestants in Valenciennes were virtually on their own. Yet they continued to fight back, and made regular sorties out of the city to forage for food in the area, and returned to Valenciennes resupplied. Several contemporary Catholic writers were amazed that untrained and ill-armed civilians lasted so long against governmental forces. The besiegers tried to starve the defenders by pillaging and destroying all the useful land in the area; in Protestant propaganda that the Calvinist rebels directed to the Geuzen nobility in the hope of outside support, they portrayed the Noircarmes government forces who employed these scorched earth tactics as the most horrific barbarians.

At the beginning of March 1567, Jan van Marnix (1537–1567) gathered a Geuzen army at Oosterweel to relieve Valenciennes, but it was devastatingly defeated in the Battle of Oosterweel on 13 March by Philip of Lannoy (died 1574). Margaret still had patience with Valenciennes, and sent Egmont and Aarschot as mediators to the city, to no avail. De La Grange, De Brès and their allies addressed them with hubris, whereupon Noircarmes on 20 March decided to shell the city, which lasted for 36 hours. On 23 March 1567 (Palm Sunday), the defenders surrendered, and Noircarmes was able to make his entry into Valenciennes on the same day.

== Aftermath ==
Initially, De La Grange and De Brès managed to escape, but they were captured and brought to Tournai on 31 March. The cities of Tournai and Valenciennes argued for a while about who should try them; Valenciennes won, and Tournai extradicted the two captives. On 31 May 1567, De La Grange and De Brès were hanged on the market square of Valenciennes. Due to Valenciennes' capitulation, other Calvinist strongholds quickly surrendered.

== Bibliography ==
- DuPlessis, Robert S. (2002). Lille and the Dutch Revolt: Urban Stability in an Era of Revolution, 1500–1582. Cambridge: Cambridge University Press. p. 392. ISBN 9780521894173.
- Davies, C.M. (1851). The history of Holland and the Dutch nation: from the beginning of the tenth century to the end of the eighteenth; including an account of the municipal institutions, commercial pursuits, and social habits of the people; the rise and progress of the Protestant reformation, in Holland; the intestine dissensions, foreign wars, &c. G. Willis – via Internet Archive. "siege of Valenciennes 1567."
- Junot, Yves. "Valenciennes / Valencijn". dutchrevolt.leiden.edu (in French). Leiden University.
- Kuttner, Erich (1949). "XLVI De belegering van Valenciennes en de tous-nus". Het hongerjaar 1566 (in Dutch). Amsterdam: Amsterdamsche Boek- en Courantmaatschappij. pp. 374–381. (translated from German by Johan Winkler)
- Anton van der Lem. "Wattrelos". dutchrevolt.leiden.edu (in Dutch). Universiteit Leiden.
- Van der Wee, Herman (1969). "De economie als factor bij het begin van de opstand in de Zuidelijke Nederlanden door Herman van der Wee". BMGN: Low Countries Historical Review (in Dutch). 83. Royal Netherlands Historical Society: 15–32.
