= Pieter Titelmans =

Habsburg Netherlands inquisitor (1501–1572)

- Inquisitor of Flanders
- Appointed: 1545
- Retired: 1566
- Other post(s): Dean of Ronse

Personal details
- Born: 1501; Hasselt, Prince-bishopric of Liège, Holy Roman Empire
- Died: 5 September 1572; Kortrijk, County of Flanders, Habsburg Netherlands
- Education: Licentiate of Sacred Theology
- Alma mater: University of Leuven

Pieter Titelmans (1501–1572) was a notorious inquisitor in the Habsburg Netherlands. He also served as Dean of Ronse. As inquisitor, he conducted a campaign to suppress religious dissent that earned him the nickname of "Saul the Persecutor".

== Education ==
Titelmans, a native of Hasselt, matriculated at Leuven University on 27 February 1526. Initially a student at Falcon College, he transferred to Pig College to improve his Latin. He graduated Master of Arts in 1531, as first of his class. He studied Theology under Ruard Tapper, Johannes Driedo and Nicolaus Curtius, graduating Licentiate of Sacred Theology in 1536. He was appointed master of Houterle College, but resigned in 1540 when appointed to the deanery of Ronse. As dean he was noted for his zeal in correcting and disciplining clerical laxity, which is probably what led to his appointment by Emperor Charles V as inquisitor of Flanders on 2 June 1545.

== Inquisition ==
Titelmans was active as inquisitor in the County of Flanders, including Walloon Flanders, and in the Tournaisis. He was assisted in his tasks by the lawyer Jean Pollet and the notary Nicolas de Hondt. His focus was on combating the spread of Calvinist and Anabaptist ideas. He was remembered as a particularly fierce persecutor by Mennonites. A contemporary satirical pamphlet, written as a dialogue between Titelmans and a secular officer of the law, has Titelmans describing those he brings to trial as "the innocent and virtuous, who make no resistance, and let themselves be taken like lambs". In fact, his activities met with constant threats of violence, including serious threats to his own life, in spite of which Titelmans persisted in investigating heresy with great rigour, disrupting families and communities in his pursuit of conformity. Between 1545 and 1566 he was directly or indirectly involved in 1,120 trials, leading to 127 executions. He was more interested in gaining recantations than convictions, and was insistent that only proven dissenters who refused to renounce their beliefs should be punished. It has been claimed that he brought charges for such alleged crimes as reading the bible, owning a book printed in Geneva, reading the Sermon on the Mount, praying directly to God, etc.

On 8 September 1564, the magistrates of the city of Bruges complained to the central authorities in Brussels concerning the disruption caused by the activities of Titelmans, and asked that religious dissent be left to their jurisdiction. The council in Brussels backed Titelmans as having jurisdiction, but strictly cautioned him to moderate his severity. In 1565, however, King Philip II of Spain wrote directly to Titelmans encouraging him to continue to do his utmost to enforce religious conformity. Jurisdictional disputes continued between Titelmans and the city of Bruges, which was backed by the States of Flanders, and this directly contributed to the grievances and political instability that would soon lead to the Dutch Revolt. In 1566 Margaret of Parma, Governor of the Habsburg Netherlands, wrote to Titelmans instructing him in the strongest terms not to conduct his work in a manner that would cause offense or inconvenience. After 1566 he was occasionally consulted in heresy trials but was no longer active in investigations.

Titelmans died in Kortrijk on 5 September 1572.

== In modern fiction ==
Titelmans appears as a villain in Ken Follet's historical novel A Column of Fire. In the book's plot, Titelmans insists on burning at the stake a 14-year old girl who refused to recant her beliefs. At the last moment, a rioting Protestant crowd manages to save her from the fire, Titelmans and his helpers fleeing for their lives.
