= Philip of Noircarmes =

Dutch statesman

Philippe René Nivelon Louis de Sainte-Aldegonde, Lord of Noircarmes (c. 1530 – Utrecht, 5 March 1574) was a statesman and soldier from the Habsburg Netherlands in the service of Charles V, Holy Roman Emperor, and Philip II of Spain. He gained notoriety during the suppression of Calvinist insurrections, especially at Valenciennes in 1566–7, and as a member of the Council of Troubles at the start of the Eighty Years' War. He was stadtholder of Hainaut from 1566, and of Holland, Zeeland and Utrecht from 1573 until his death.

== Early life ==
Noircarmes (as he is usually called in historiography) was the son of Jean de Sainte-Aldegonde, a scion of an old aristocratic family from Saint-Omer and Marie de Rubempré. His father (d. 1538) had been a chamberlain of Charles V and he himself is mentioned as a page of Charles in 1547. Noircarmes married Bonne de Lannoy on 7 September 1554. They had a son, Maximilien-Lamoral, and a daughter.

== Role in the early phase of the Dutch Revolt ==
Noircarmes was a member of the Council of State of Margaret of Parma in the early 1560s. As such, he opposed Orange, Egmont, and Horne who counseled caution to the Regent after the upheaval of the Compromise of Nobles in 1566. When, in August 1566, social unrest broke out in connection with open-air sermons of Calvinists and subsequently the Iconoclastic Fury, he argued for repression. He was made acting-stadtholder and grand baillie of Hainaut in July 1566, and at the same time put in charge of the royal forces in that area. In December 1566, Margaret charged him with the suppression of a Calvinist revolt in Valenciennes, led by Guido de Bres, among others. He laid siege to the city and captured it on 23 March 1567. De Bres was executed along with many other citizens of Valenciennes. Noircarmes by that time had already captured rebellious Tournai and executed many Calvinists there. He next went to 's-Hertogenbosch and Maastricht and forced them to take in royal garrisons. Finally, he went to Holland and punished in short order Gouda, Schoonhoven and Amsterdam in May.

Meanwhile, King Philip had sent Fernando Álvarez de Toledo, 3rd Duke of Alba to the Netherlands with an army to restore order. Noircarmes went to meet Alba and made an immediate good impression. When Alba formed his Council of Troubles in September 1567, he made Noircarmes its vice-president. Noircarmes next convinced the Count of Egmont not to evade arrest by Alba. (Egmont later was executed).

As a member of the Council of State, Noircarmes advised against Alba's plans to institute new taxes (the Tenth Penny), but Alba ignored this advice.

After the siege of the fortress of Mons (that had been captured by Louis of Nassau in May 1572), Noircarmes was entrusted with the punishment of its citizens for their rebellion. Next, in October 1572, he accompanied Alba to Mechelen and encouraged the Spanish soldiers to sack that city. Then he accompanied Alba's son Fadrique Álvarez de Toledo, 4th Duke of Alba on his punitive expedition to Holland. He took part in the Siege of Haarlem in 1573.

When Maximilien de Hénin-Liétard, the royal stadtholder of Holland, was taken prisoner of war by the rebels in October 1573, Noircarmes was appointed his successor. However, at the Siege of Alkmaar he was wounded. He died of these wounds in Utrecht on 5 March 1574.

== Sources ==
- "Philippe de Sainte-Aldegonde de Noircarmes" in: Société des sciences, des arts et des lettres du Hainaut (1888) Mémoires et publications de la Société des sciences, des arts et des lettres du Hainaut, Maison Léon Lasseau, pp. 136–137

Political offices
Preceded by Maximilien de Hénin-Liétard (during the Eighty Years' War)	Stadtholder of Holland, Zeeland and Utrecht; 1567–1573	Succeeded by Gilles de Berlaymont, lord of Hierges (during the Eighty Years' War)
