= Walburgis van Nieuwenaer =

Dutch countess

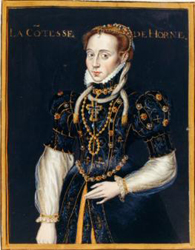
Portrait of Walburgis van Nieuwenaer (Austrian National Library, Vienna)

Anna Walburgis van Nieuwenaer (1522-1600) was a politically active Dutch countess.

She married Philip de Montmorency, Count of Horn in 1543. She was a Protestant and actively supported the Protestant movement in the fief of her spouse. She was aware of the great Protestant Iconoclast revolt in 1567, which is evident from the fact that she advised the nuns of a convent, to which she was sympathetic, to hide their valuables. Her spouse was executed for his Protestant conviction in 1568. She was not executed, but exiled from the fief of her late spouse. She remarried her 20 years younger nephew Adolf van Nieuwenaar in 1569 or 1570. He was a Protestant on the side of the Prince of Orange, and according to tradition, she encouraged his opinions. She actively participated in the Protestant cause during the war: in 1586, she acted as diplomat when she was given the task to negotiate with the earl of Leicester in order to supply more troops for her spouse.
