= Guido de Bres =

Walloon protestant theologian reformer

- Born: 1522; Mons, County of Hainaut, Southern Netherlands
- Died: 31 May 1567 (aged 44–45); Valenciennes
- Occupations: Reformer, minister, author, theologian
- Notable work: Belgic Confession
- Theological work
- Era: Protestant Reformation
- Tradition or movement: Calvinism
- Main interests: Systematic theology

Guido de Bres (also known as Guido de Bray, Guy de Brès, Guy de Bray and Guido de Brès, 1522 – 31 May 1567) was a Walloon pastor, Protestant reformer and theologian, a student of John Calvin and Theodore Beza in Geneva. He was born in Mons, County of Hainaut, Southern Netherlands, and was executed at Valenciennes. De Bres compiled and published the Walloon Confession of Faith known as the Belgic Confession (1561) (Confessio Belgica) still in use today in Belgium and the Netherlands. It is also used by many Reformed Churches all over the world.

== Early life ==
De Bres was born in Mons, today in southwestern Belgium. His father, formerly known as Jean Du Beguinage (alternatively: Jan le Béguinage), was an itinerant blauschilder [lit. blue painter] which is indicative of the tin-glazed process, a precursor to Delftware, introduced into the Netherlands by Guido de Savino in 1512 at Antwerp. Jean changed his name to de Bres when he settled in Mons. He and his wife had five children: Jehan, Jherome, Christoffel, Guido and daughter Mailette. Rehalenbeck suggests one other son, Michel.

De Bres was brought up by his mother, a devout Roman Catholic. Guido was a Roman Catholic and was very strong in that faith by all accounts. Not much is known of Guido's early life other than he followed his brother Jehan into school at the appropriate age and after a basic education followed his father in learning the craft of blauschilder. The de Bres family was known for their skills in glass painting, and young Guido was trained in this art before moving to England. In his teenage years, he became a follower of the Protestant religion as taught by Martin Luther. Later he became convinced of Calvinism. He met and studied under John Calvin at the academy of Geneva where Calvin taught.

== Career ==
Guido was converted between the ages of 18 and 25. It is almost certain he became familiar with the Reformed faith through printed works. On 22 September 1540, a proclamation banned a large number of books: by Erasmus in Latin, Melanchthon, Eobanus Hessus and others, as well as the New Testament, the Gospels, the Epistles, and the prophetical books of the Bible in French and Flemish. These books were deemed heretical by the Roman Catholic Church authorities.

In 1548, while Guido was still in Mons, he forged a friendship with an English couple: Mr. Nicholas and his wife. Mr Nicholas, his friend and two wives were caught by the authorities and charged with subversion of the Roman Catholic faith. They were imprisoned together with a number of Protestants from that area. Guido fled to England during the reign of Edward VI. On 4 November 1547, the English parliament decided to allow the two elements used in the communion to be enjoyed by all people. Guido probably kept company with a number of refugees from continental Europe: Tremellius, Valérand Poullain, Martin Bucer, John a Lasco, Jan Utenhove, Marten de Klyne (Marten Micron or Micronius), Wouter Deelen, François Perucel de la Rivière and others. Whilst in England, Guido attended the church of John à Lasco, and in 1551 he became familiar with à Lasco's London Confession. The largest group of refugees came from the Low Countries. John à Lasco served as superintendent to a number of foreign congregations including the Dutch. Guido left England in 1552 before Mary, Queen of England came to the throne.

De Bres went to Germany and later moved back to Geneva. Around 1559, he returned to the Low Countries as a travelling Calvinist preacher. From 1559 to 1561, he served as the resident minister in Tournai. In 1561, de Bres authored the Belgic Confession. This confession was meant for the Spanish government to show them that the Calvinists were not a radical Anabaptist sectarian movement but demanded a Reformation in the biblical sense of the Roman Catholic Church. The text is strongly influenced by Calvin's "Institutes of the Christian Religion" and the creed of the French Huguenots. The creed was printed by Jean Crespin in Geneva. On the night of 1 November 1561, de Bres threw his creed over the castle wall of Tournai, where Margaret of Parma, governor of the Netherlands stayed, to bring the confession to the attention of the Spanish government.

== Death and legacy ==
In 1567, after the Siege of Valenciennes, de Bres was arrested for his Calvinist beliefs and his rebellion during the siege. He was tried before the Spanish Inquisition, received the death penalty and was hanged at Valenciennes. He died in front of a large crowd after making a final statement of his beliefs. He was pushed off the scaffold by the hangman whilst addressing the crowd. Twelve days before his death he wrote a letter to his wife, which speaks of his trust in God.

De Bres wrote a number of books. The Belgic Confession is part of the Three Forms of Unity, a set of official statements of doctrine used by churches with roots in the continental Reformed tradition. Its text is still in wide use in particular among confessionally Reformed churches.
