= Battle of Oosterweel =

1567 battle of the Eighty Years' War near Antwerp, present-day Belgium

- Part of the Eighty Years' War
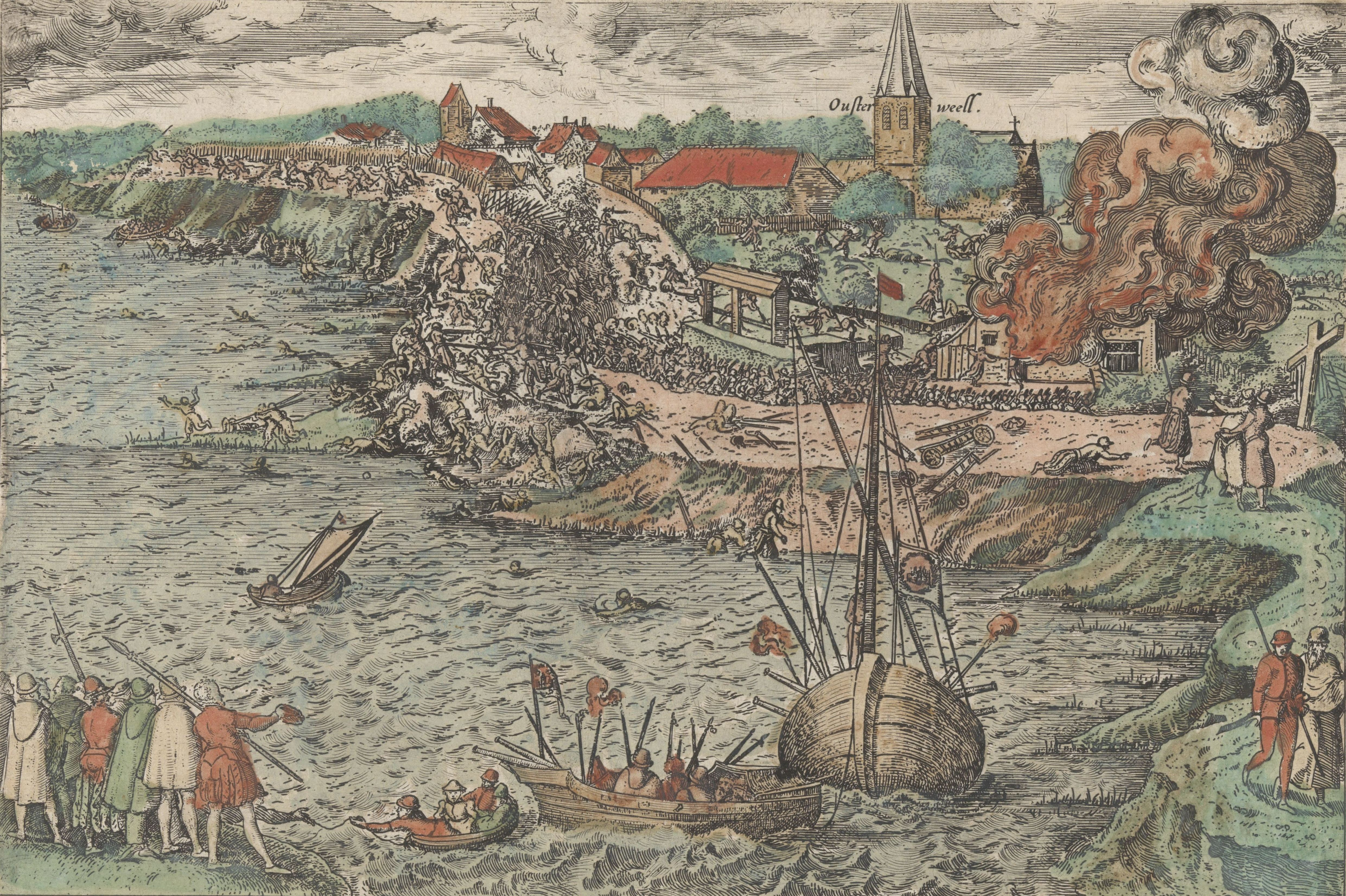
- Battle of Oosterweel; From Frans Hogenberg's Nederlandse Gebeurtenissen
Date	13 March 1567
Location	Oosterweel, north of Antwerp, Duchy of Brabant, Spanish Netherlands (present-day Belgium) 51°14′37″N 4°23′5″E
Result	Spanish victory

Belligerents
Dutch rebels	Spanish Empire

Commanders and leaders
Jean Marnix †	(Spanish Empire) Philip de Lannoy

Strength
2,500	800

Casualties and losses
"Almost the entire force killed or captured"	Unknown

Oosterweel in present-day Belgium

The Battle of Oosterweel took place on 13 March 1567 near the village of Oosterweel, near Antwerp, in present-day Belgium, and is traditionally seen as the beginning of the Eighty Years' War. (Note: The Dutch typically view Louis of Nassau's surprise victory at Heiligerlee in 1568 as the first true battle of the Eighty Years' War.) A Spanish mercenary army surprised a band of rebels and killed or captured almost all of them.

== Background ==
Beginning in 1566, Protestant mobs in the provincial states of the Netherlands began destroying Catholic art and images (the Beeldenstorm) to protest the taxes, restrictions on religion, and harsh rule of Philip II of Spain, sovereign of the Habsburg Netherlands. In March 1567, under the leadership of a young nobleman, Jean Marnix, rebels gathered and built a fortified compound at Oosterweel, approximately 1.6 kilometres (1 mi) from Antwerp.

== Battle ==
Attempting to deal with the gathering of the rebels, Margaret of Parma, the Spanish governor of the Habsburg Netherlands, employed a mercenary army to confront the rebels. The army was provided in large part by the loyalist Count Egmont and led by Philip de Lannoy, Seigneur De Beauvoir, who served as the commander of the governor's bodyguards.

On 12 March, the Spanish mercenary army prepared for the battle in secret. The troop of eight hundred men was split into small groups and quietly placed for deployment. Helmets, bucklers, arquebuses, corselets, spears, standards and drums were distributed silently. Before daybreak on 13 March, the soldiers were advised that they would advance on the rebels with banners furled and no drumbeat. Once the enemy was in sight, the soldiers were told that they should fire upon the rebels in volleys.

When the battle started, the rebels were caught completely by surprise. Although Jean Marnix exhibited bravery, most of the rebels were panic-stricken and shot wildly. The Spanish mercenaries easily broke into the rebel encampment, killing hundreds of the rebels and causing hundreds more to flee. With the battle won, the Spanish mercenaries hunted down and killed those rebels who had fled, including Jean Marnix who was sliced to pieces. Hardly any rebels escaped the slaughter, those that were taken prisoner were later executed.

In the nearby city of Antwerp, William the Silent, the burgrave of the city, attempted to block those Protestants of Antwerp that desired to go to the aid of the rebels as he said that he was bound by oath to support Philip II. Those citizens that defied him to go to the aid of the rebels quickly retreated for the most part when they saw the dominance and ferocity of the Spanish mercenaries.

== Aftermath ==
The slaughter caused Calvinists to immediately cease the open defiance of Spanish authority. Calvinist worship all throughout the Netherlands was affected, and many dissidents including William the Silent fled to other countries.

== In literature ==
The battle and its aftermath are depicted in Cecelia Holland's novel The Sea Beggars—seen through the eyes of an idealistic young Calvinist from Antwerp who tries to join the rebels but arrives too late.

== Gallery ==
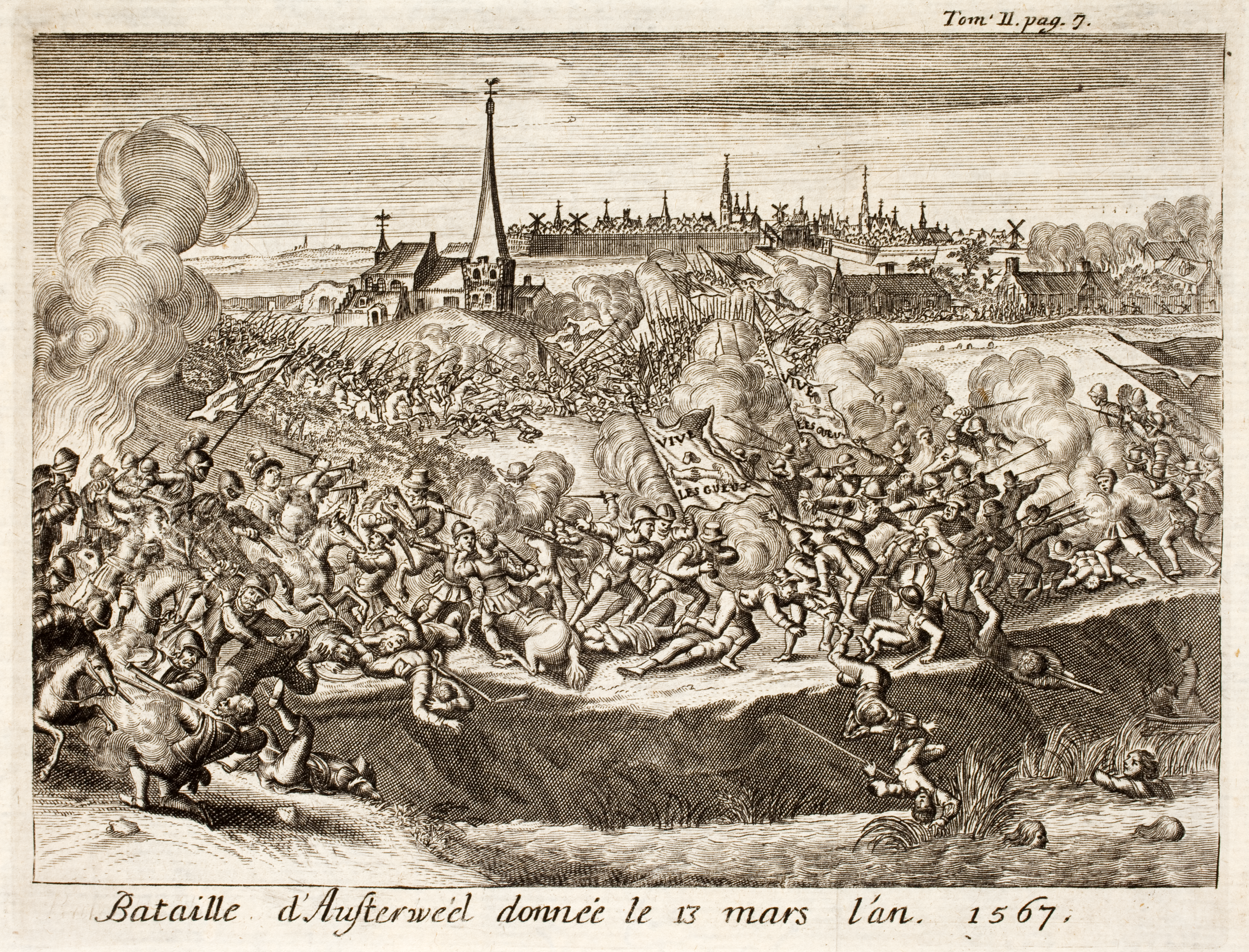
Battle of Oosterweel
Famien Strada

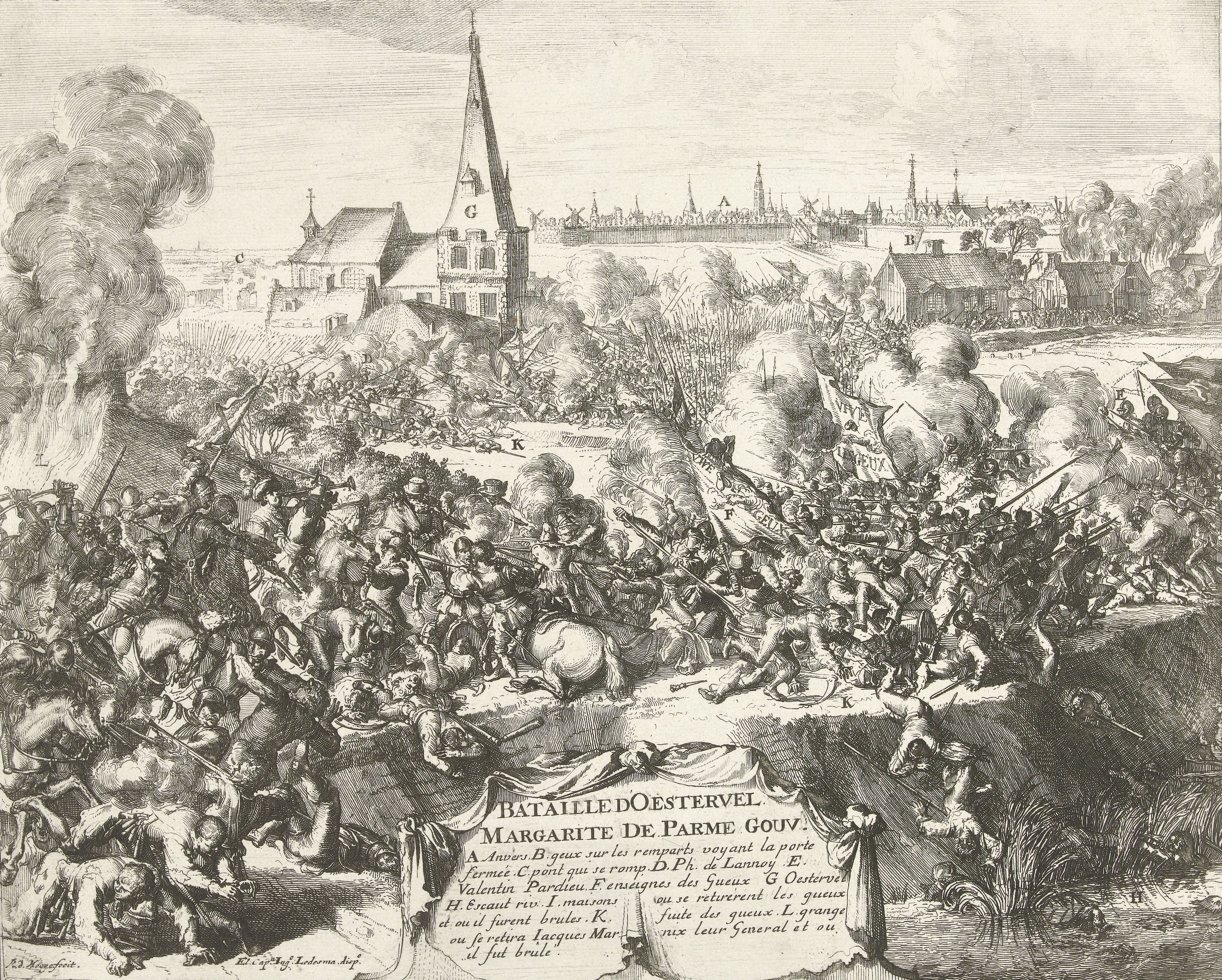
Battle of Oosterweel, engraving by Romeyn de Hooghe
