= Philip de Montmorency, Count of Horn =

Count of Horn

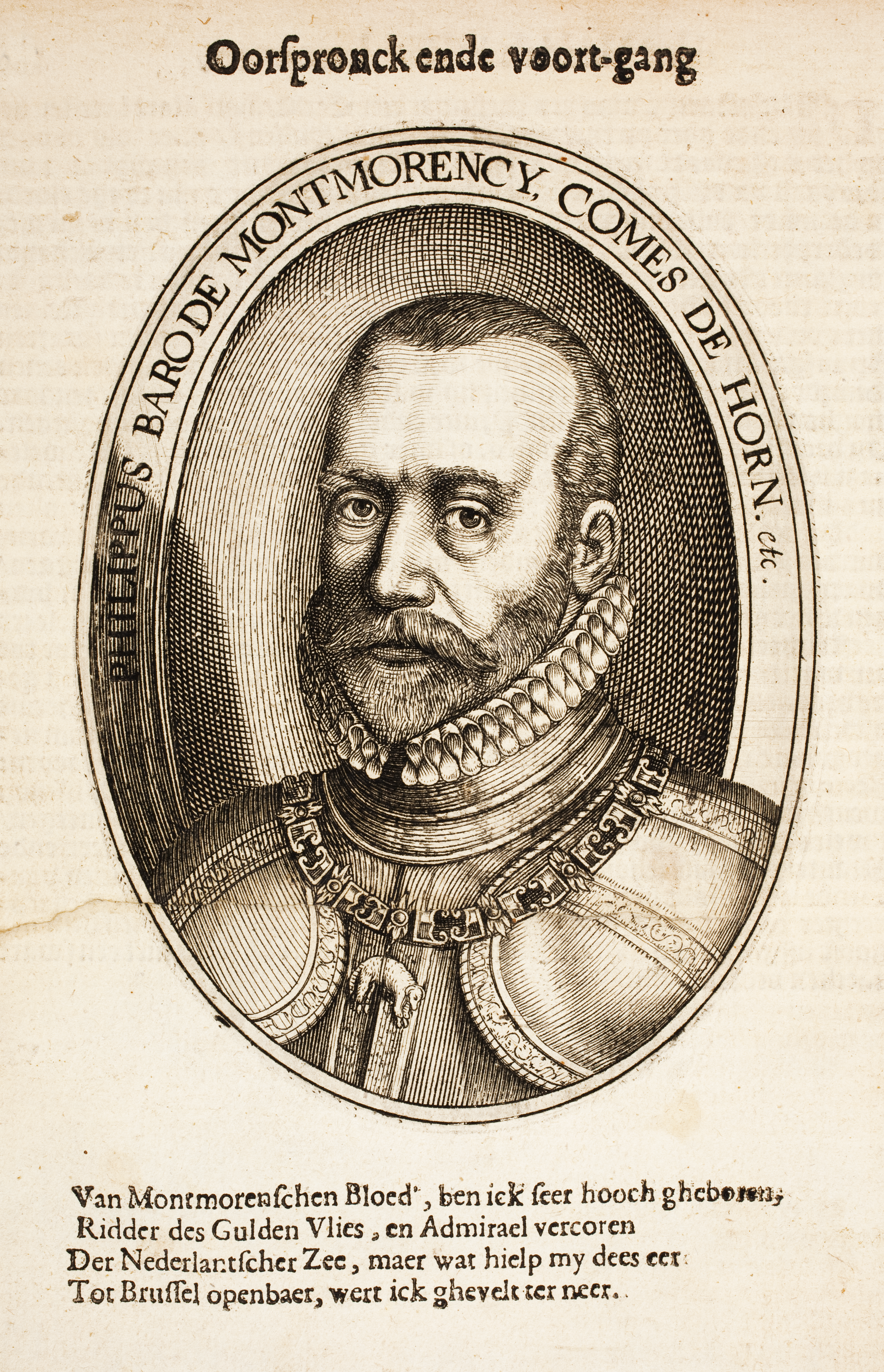
A portrait of Philip

Philip de Montmorency (ca. 1524 – 5 June 1568 in Brussels), also known as Count of Horn, Horne, Hornes, Hoorne or Hoorn, was a Dutch nobleman executed for treason by Spain.

== Biography ==
De Montmorency was born as the eldest of four children of Josef van Montmorency, Count of Nevele and Anna van Egmont the Elder, who had married shortly after 26 August 1523, and lived at Ooidonk Castle. His father died early in 1530 in Bologna, Italy, where he was attending the coronation of Charles V as Holy Roman Emperor. His mother remarried to Johan II, Count of Horn, one of the wealthiest nobles of the Netherlands, who, in 1540, left the County of Horne to his wife's children on condition they assume his name. A page and later chamberlain at the court of Charles V, de Montmorency married Walburgis van Nieuwenaer in 1546. He became stadtholder of Guelders in 1555, an Admiral of Flanders and a knight of the Golden Fleece in 1556.

In 1559, De Montmorency commanded the state fleet which conveyed Philip II from the Netherlands to Spain, and he remained at the Spanish court until 1563. On his return, he joined the Prince of Orange and Lamoral, Count of Egmont, at the head of the faction which opposed the imposition of the Spanish Inquisition in the Netherlands by Cardinal Granvelle and ultimately forced his resignation. When Granvelle retired, the three nobles continued to resist the introduction of the Inquisition and of Spanish rule in the Netherlands. In April 1566, the Council of State sent Philip's younger brother, Floris of Montmorency, to Spain in a last attempt to avoid war. However, Floris was arrested, kept under house arrest, and later secretly executed.

Although Philip II of Spain appeared to give way, he had made up his mind to punish the opponents of his policy. He replaced the regent, Margaret, duchess of Parma, with the Duke of Alba, who entered the Netherlands at the head of a veteran army.

Orange fled from the country, but Egmont and Horn, despite his warning, decided to remain and face the storm. They were both seized, tried at the Council of Troubles and condemned as traitors. Ceaseless but vain efforts were made to obtain a fair trial for Horn, and appeals for clemency on his behalf were made by potentates in all parts of the continent. Egmont and Horn were beheaded on 5 June 1568 before the Town Hall on the Grand-Place/Grote Markt (Brussels' main square). Two years later, Philip II had Horn's still-detained brother Floris strangled in secret and spread the rumor that he had died of disease.

== Legacy ==
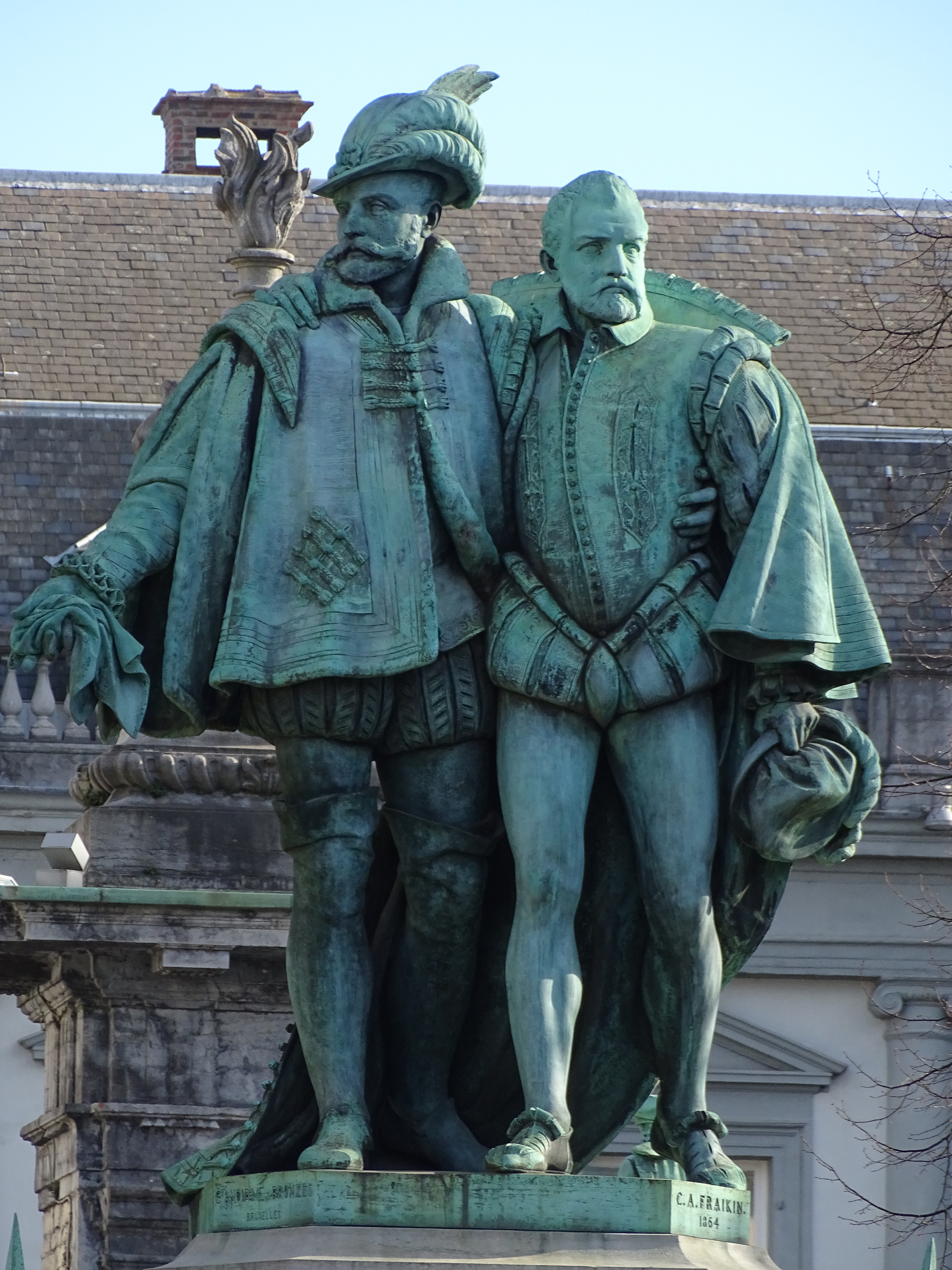
Statue of Egmont and Hoorne, Square du Petit Sablon/Kleine Zavelsquare, Brussels

Today, a statue on the Square du Petit Sablon/Kleine Zavelsquare in Brussels commemorates the Counts of Egmont and Horn. In historical overview, they are usually mentioned together as Egmond en Hoorne and hailed as the first leaders of the Dutch revolt, as the predecessors of William of Orange, who grew to importance and obtained the rebel leadership after their execution.

Van Egmont ("Egmond") and De Montmorency ("Horn" or "Horne") both remained faithful Catholics and are commemorated in Belgium, with its traditional Catholic majority.
