= Historiography of the Eighty Years' War =

Area of study on c. 1566/1568–1648 war

The Eighty Years' War has given rise to more historical controversies than any other topic from the history of the Nederlanden [Low Countries] whatsoever.

— Encarta Encyclopedie Winkler Prins (2002)

The historiography of the Eighty Years' War examines how the Eighty Years' War has been viewed or interpreted throughout the centuries. Some of the main issues of contention between scholars include the name of the war (most notably "Eighty Years' War" versus "Dutch Revolt"), the periodisation of the war (particularly when it started, which events to include or exclude, and whether the effective length of the war justifies counting "eighty years" or not), the origins or causes of the war (the Protestant Reformation or the violation of the rights and privileges of the nobility and autonomous cities) and thus its nature (a religious war, a civil war or a war of independence), the meaning of its historical documents such as the Act of Abjuration, and the role of its central characters such as Philip II of Spain, William "the Silent" of Orange, Margaret of Parma, the Duke of Alba, the Duke of Parma, Maurice of Orange, and Johan van Oldenbarnevelt. It has been theorised that Protestant Reformation propaganda has given rise to the Spanish Black Legend in order to portray the actions of the Spanish Empire, the Army of Flanders and the Catholic Church in an exaggerated extremely negative light, while other scholars maintain that the atrocities committed by the Spanish military in order to preserve the Habsburg Netherlands for the Empire have historically been portrayed fairly accurately. Controversy also rages about the importance of the war for the emergence of the Dutch Republic as the predecessor of the current Kingdom of the Netherlands and the role of the House of Orange's stadtholders in it, as well as the development of Dutch and Belgian national identities as a result of the split of the Northern and Southern Netherlands.

== Overview ==
Various historiographers have portrayed the Eighty Years' War in different ways.

=== 17th and 18th century ===
A group of 17th-century Dutch Protestant chroniclers such as Hooft, Bor, Meteren, Grotius, Aitzema and Baudartius could build on first-hand reports. As liberal historian Fruin and Catholic historian Nuyens would agree in the mid-19th century, 'before 1798, it was impossible for Catholics in the Northern Netherlands to describe the history of the revolution of the sixteenth century', because the Dutch Republic was dominated by the Dutch Reformed Church (although not formally a 'state church', it was publicly privileged), whose Calvinist preachers were able to influence the secular authorities (the States) to punish any Catholic inhabitant for mounting public criticism of the Protestant consensus on history. Nuyens (1869) summarised the situation as follows:

Because of all this, only one part of the Dutch people was left to do the talking, as soon as there was talk of 'the revolt against the Spanish tyranny'; the other, however, might have its traditions, its views, its opinions, yet it could not express them. Bor, van Meteren, Reyd, Hooft, all remained very one-sided in their views. Their successors, the men who wrote about the Dutch Revolt in the eighteenth century, drew on them and worked out their material further. There was no longer the slightest doubt in their minds whether the revolt was lawful: Philip was a hideous tyrant; Orange to one side a man of God, to the other (the staatse) in all cases a great benefactor of his country; the Reformed fought for the true freedom of the children of God, for the pure Gospel light; they also fought for civil liberties against a most appalling despotism. The party papers of Jacob van Wesembeke, the Apology, the Defences of the States against Don Juan, etc., etc., were regarded as infallible truths: the "Romish folks," as one expressed themselves, they might well live in peace and tranquility, provided they behaved only quietly and did not claim the least of rights at all.

Aside from them, there were a few Catholic historians who covered the Eighty Years' War, but either wrote in Latin, such as Floris Van der Haer and Michael ab Isselt, or were foreigners, such as Famiano Strada and Guido Bentivoglio, and as such were either inaccessible for Dutch Catholics, or could not speak on their behalf. (Note: Although he acknowledged there had been other Catholic writers, Nuyens found none of their writings to be particularly notable so far: 'To be honest, in the Northern Netherlands one does not find a Catholic writer of any repute, or influence, who has described the history of the Netherlandish revolution of the 16th century in his mother tongue. Father [Augustine] van Teylingen's booklet, for example, does not deserve that status. Fl. v.d. Haer and M. ab Isselt wrote in Latin. Strada and Bentivoglio were foreigners.')

==== De Bello Belgico by Strada ====
A 1681 Spanish edition of Famiano Strada's De Bello Belgico (Spanish: de las Guerras de Flandes), full PDF

The Latin work De Bello Belgico (invoking Caesar's classic) of the Italian Jesuit historian Famiano Strada (1572–1649) became popular throughout Europe and was translated into many languages. Strada first published it in Rome as De Bello Belgico decades duae between 1632 and 1647, the first 'decade' in 1632, the second in 1641. The first set of ten books (the first 'decade') covered the period from Charles V's abdication in 1555 to the death of Don Juan of Austria in October 1578. The second set of ten books (the second 'decade') covered the time from the start of Alexander Farnese's government in October 1578 to the conquest of Rheinberg (30 January 1590). A third volume is said to have been prevented from publication by Spanish authorities. Strada's first volume was translated to Dutch as De thien eerste Boecken der Nederlandsche oorloge and published in Amsterdam in 1646, the second as De tweede thien boeken der Nederlandsche oorlogen in Amsterdam in 1649; both parts in Rotterdam in 1655 titled De thien eerste Boecken der Nederlandtsche oorloge and Het Tweede Deel der Nederlandtsche Oorlogen. Pierre du Ryer published both volumes in French under the title Histoire de la guerre de Flandre (Paris 1650). The first decade of the De Bello Belgico was translated into English by Sir Robert Stapylton under the title of The History of the Low-Countrey Warres (London 1650). There were many editions of the original Latin, and continuations were prepared by G. Dondini and A. Gallucci, an Italian translation by C. Papini and P. Segneri (Rome 1638–49, 2 v.), and a Spanish edition by Melchior de Novar (Cologne 1681, 3 v.). Scifoni (1849) stated that 'Strada's work will hold a distinct place among the historical works of the 17th century', despite its 'useless digressions, the insignificant peculiarities and the abuse of comparisons, sentences and all the vain formulas marked by the oratory style'. Strada made extensive use of the Farnese family archives (now destroyed), and was very critical of Alba's performance in fighting the rebels in the Netherlands. According to Reijner (2020), Strada and Guido Bentivoglio were far from the only Italian historians writing about the Eighty Years' War: an unusually high number of them from across the peninsula, such as Florence and Genoa, used the revolt happening in the Habsburg Netherlands for their own purposes in arguing against the dominance of the Spanish Habsburgers in (northern) Italy. In return, Netherlandish historiographers and opionmakers thankfully cited the works of Strada, Bentivoglio and other Italian authors in support of their arguments against Spain.

==== Annales et Historiae de rebus Belgicis by Grotius ====
Between 1601 and 1612, Hugo Grotius wrote in Latin the Annales et Historiae de rebus Belgicis for the 1559–1588 period. Grotius adopted the style of Tacitus, and following his sine ira et studio principle, excluded gruesome details of pillaging and battles. The book was commissioned by the States of Holland, but they didn't publish it. It was not until 1681 that a Dutch translation was published, and half a century later it was forgotten again until 2014, when Jan Waszink published a modern Dutch translation. It remains unclear why the States of Holland apparently blocked the Latin publication in 1612, but Waszink concluded they probably found Grotius too critical. Rather than presenting the war as 'a united fight for faith and the old freedoms', Grotius wrote that it was 'a difficult struggle with powerful Spain on the one hand, and with divisions, political self-interest and religious fanaticism on the Dutch side on the other.' Meanwhile, the Catholic Church, though initially positive about a Latin version of the book published in 1657, concluded it had anti-Catholic contents and put it on the Index Librorum Prohibitorum in 1659.

Another work by Grotius that did see publication in 1610 was his Treatise of the Antiquity of the Batavian now Hollandish Republic, a rehashing of the Batavian myth from the 1517 Divisiekroniek, an invented tradition which asserted that the inhabitants of the County of Holland were descended from the ancient tribe of the Batavi. During the 69–70 Revolt of the Batavi, this people allegedly freed itself from the Roman Empire and had supposedly been independent ever since, but just changed its name to "Hollanders", and evolved the States of Holland and West Friesland as its political organisation. Although various nominal counts or kings who had ruled over them in the intervening centuries, they 'never really mattered', and the supposed Batavi-turned-Hollanders had always remained republican at heart, and free in practice. The Dutch Revolt against Spain was therefore a confirmation of a very old, long-established freedom rather than a rebellion against a legitimate and widely recognised monarch. This Batavian myth continued to have large influence, reaching its zenith during the late-18th-century Batavian Revolution, but was scrutinised and refuted by historians in the early 19th century.

==== Nederlandsche Historien by Hooft ====
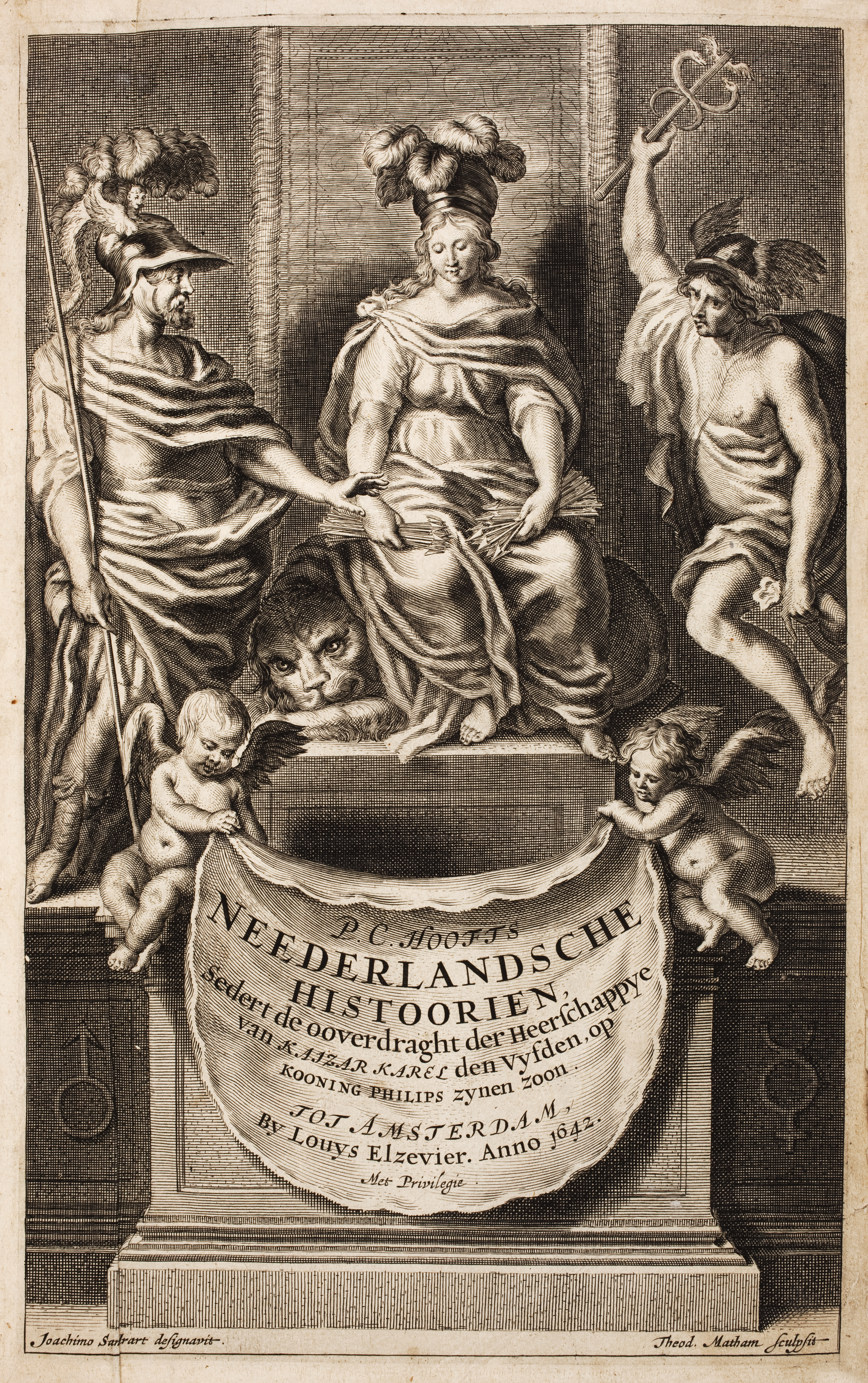
Frontispiece of the Nederlandsche Historien Volume I (1642)

One of the first Dutch authors was P.C. Hooft with his Nederlandsche Historien (1642–1647), which covered the 1555–1587 period. Hooft was a Renaissance humanist who took no sides in religious matters, nor was he a member of any church, but he was educated with an admiration for Tacitus (whose style he adopted, just like Grotius before him) and a staatse republican perspective on justifying the revolt against Spain based on the sovereignty of the States, regarding Orange as their servant. In 1609, 28-year-old Hooft wrote several poems to commemorate the Twelve Years' Truce, in which he compared the Dutch revolt against Spain to the Overthrow of the Roman monarchy, and Orange to Moses as the Israelites' liberator from slavery. However, in the last 20 years of his life (1626–1647), he became more balanced and nuanced, and at that time he wrote his historical book about the war (which was still ongoing, and only concluded a year after Hooft died). Imitating Tacitus' style, Hooft's work was didactic, trying to teach his readers lessons by using events from the war as examples, but he often struggled to construct a coherent narrative to explain certain chains of events, especially the actions of Don Juan of Austria. Again Hooft attempted to justify the revolt against Spain as a fight against tyranny, because the Burgundians and their Habsburg successors had supposedly violated the inalienable sovereignty of the States, even though his arguments were 'unhistorical' according to Groenveld (1981). On the other hand, he tried to present a nuanced view of Spanish adversaries such as Philip II, Alba, and Requesens, mentioning their positive and negative sides, although the emphasis would still be on the latter. Towards the end of his book, Orange became the main character, the story's hero who was killed too soon, and never sought power for himself but only served the States. As his health deteriorated, Hooft's coverage of the period in which the Earl of Leicester acted as Elizabeth I's Governor-General of the budding Dutch Republic became increasingly incoherent. Hooft got as far as describing 1587 when he died in 1647, unable to realise his ambition of catching up to his own time.

==== 18th century ====
In the eighteenth century, the collection of sources from the time of the Eighty Years' War became more important. In particular, the compilation of Jan Wagenaar from the mid-eighteenth century became a standard work for that time and as a result, contemporary writers receded more into the background.

=== 19th century ===
==== Early 19th century ====
In the nineteenth century, the Eighty Years' War was again extensively researched.

According to the Calvinist anti-revolutionary politician Guillaume Groen van Prinsterer, the Revolt was about how through God's guidance the Dutch people under the House of Orange-Nassau had achieved its liberty. This view was most clearly expounded in his Handbook of the History of the Fatherland (1846). VU historian H. Smitskamp (1940) judged that Groen was all too often limiting himself to ideals as a factor in history, and had an overreliance on 'God's hand in history', which was increasingly seen as scholarly problematic.

In the middle of the nineteenth century, the Belgian scholars Louis-Prosper Gachard and Joseph Kervyn de Lettenhove also carried out a thorough source research into the Eighty Years' War, especially in the Brussels and Spanish archives.

==== The Rise of the Dutch Republic by Motley/Bakhuizen ====
An 1882 edition of Volume 3 of The Rise of the Dutch Republic, covering the years 1576–1584, full PDF

The liberal Reinier Cornelis Bakhuizen van den Brink (born 1810) made important contributions to Eighty Years' War studies starting in 1844, and as the National Archivist from 1854 to 1865. According to Winkler Prins (2002), Bakhuizen 'renewed and raised historical scholarship together with Robert Fruin as historian and unsurpassed master of historical criticism.' In 1857, he translated The Rise of the Dutch Republic (1856) from the American puritan historian John Lothrop Motley. Bakhuizen was very positive about the book: "The work of Motley seems to me to represent such a proper foundation for the history of the formation of the Commonwealth of United Netherlands, that it almost becomes a duty to contribute everything that one himself possesses to continue building on that foundation." Fellow liberal historian Robert Fruin published an almost equally positive review of the book in 1859, admiring Motley's talents as a writer, agreeing with Bakhuizen's "favourable judgement wholeheartedly", although the book required some "addition and correction".

On the other hand, the freethinker historian Johannes van Vloten was utterly critical, and addressed Fruin (and indirectly Bakhuizen) in the preface to his book The Netherlands' Revolt Against Spain. Volume 4 (1575–1577) (1860): "...regarding the appropriate valuation of Motley's efforts (...), I rather less agree with your overly favourable judgement. (...) One cannot continue building on Motley['s "foundation"]; to that end – save for the few bits and pieces he copied here and there from Groen's Archives and Gachard's Correspondances – to that end his representations are generally too outdated." Van Vloten appreciated Motley's attempt to generate attention to the history of the Netherlands amongst an English-speaking audience, but his lack of Dutch-language knowledge prevented him from reviewing the latest insights from Dutch historiographers, and made him prone to partiality in favour of the Protestants and against the Catholics. Van Vloten therefore rejected Bakhuizen's assertion that Motley had laid a "proper foundation" for further research, and Fruin's suggestion of merely doing some "addition and correction" wouldn't be enough to save it. Fruin published a new two-part review of the book in De Gids in 1862, which was a lot more critical of Motley's tendency to make up "facts", or emphasise less relevant events and downplay more relevant events, if they made for a more interesting or picturesque narrative. (Note: 'Some events, which were picturesquely presented, are described at length in full detail; others, on the other hand, who are less suited for this purpose, are dismissed in passing with few words. This, in my view, is a grave, almost unforgivable mistake. The facts must come to the fore in proportion as they are important, not as they appear poetically. Evidently, whatever fact is most elaborately and most vividly drawn makes the deepest impression on the mind of the reader: but if this is not also the main fact around which the other incidents are grouped, then in the mind of the reader, the main and secondary matter in the representation are confused, and the memory will retain a distorted and false picture of history. In our judgement, Motley is glaringly at fault in this regard.')

Finally, in his Nederlandsche Beroerten (1867), Catholic historiographer Wilhelmus Nuyens had nothing positive to say about Motley, whom Nuyens accused of writing a novel rather than a history book. He shared the criticism of Fruin and especially Van Vloten that Motley had 'distorted' and 'twisted' facts, and 'painted them according to his fantasy' whenever that would make Philip II, the Spaniards or the Catholics look worse, or the Dutch rebels or Protestants look better. For example, Nuyens (1869) pointed out that the baseless rumour that the heads of Egmont and Horne (decapitated on 5 June 1568 in Brussels) had been shipped to Madrid, had already been refuted in 1801 when the Egmont's crypt containing Egmont's skull and bones had been found in the church of Zottegem. This was a well-known fact by the time Motley visited Belgium, and Nuyens suggested he could easily have falsified the story if he wanted to, but instead Motley repeated the already-refuted rumour by claiming it was generally assumed to be true (whereas his predecessors never presumed the story's veracity), and even exaggerated it by adding details that made Philip II look even more despicable.

After Fruin had read Nuyens's critique of The Rise of the Dutch Republic, he stated in 1867: 'I must now confess that the tone in which the eloquent American has written must be offensive to Catholics, and what is much worse, that he has not spoken the pure truth everywhere. When reading the moving book, I hadn't noticed that as much. I did note many inaccuracies in it, and called them out in my review; but non-Catholic as I am, it hadn't occurred to me that many of those falsehoods and exaggerations came from a bias in Protestant and liberal understandings, and for that reason had to be doubly insulting to strict Catholics. Dr Nuyens was the first to make this clear to me.'

==== Fruin and Nuyens ====
Fruin criticising the onesidedness of Dutch historiography (up to 1865)

"No wonder our people have only incomplete knowledge of the history of the revolt against Spain. Our Protestant historiographers do not consider themselves called upon to elaborate on the outrages perpetrated by the rebels: they pass over such scenes with a general description and a word of disapproval. And a Catholic historiographer worthy of being read by everyone has not yet arisen. Where, then, will the public, from whom one surely cannot require a study of the sources, learn the full truth?"

— Robert Fruin (May 1865)

Robert Fruin (1823–1899) was described by Albert van der Zeijden (2012) as the first Dutch historian who strove to apply the historical-critical method to vaderlandse geschiedenis ("fatherland/national/patriotic history", that is, the history of the Netherlands). Van der Zeijden circumscribed his method as 'a careful investigation of authentic historical sources (usually state documents as well as letters and memoirs of important statesmen)' and 'an impartial, positivist manner of historiography'. Fruin is said to have laid the basis for this approach in his speech The impartiality of the historian (1860) on the occasion of his appointment as professor at Leiden University. This made him comparable to the German historian Leopold von Ranke (1795–1886), founder of the historism school. Fruin did not always follow purely scholarly principles, however, but also pursued a nationalist-liberal agenda: history was to be viewed in national terms. For the history of the Netherlands, this meant on the one hand that the staatse/Loevesteinian and prinsgezinde/Orangist traditions had to be reconciled with each other, and on the other hand that liberalism was supposed to function as an 'impartial' referee between Protestant and Catholic views. Fruin focused on two periods: Tien jaren uit den Tachtigjarigen Oorlog (1857) for 1588–1598 and Het voorspel van de Tachtigjarigen Oorlog (1859) for 1555–1568. His early work showed a tendency towards staatse views, his later work had more Orangist undertones.

Fruin's approach was a clear break from that of his contemporaries such as Guillaume Groen van Prinsterer, who was promoting a Calvinist-Orangist nationalism. He was hoping for a critical Catholic historian to arise and bring balance to the onesidedness of Dutch historiography of the war, that had been dominated by Protestants for centuries. The Catholic answer to the Protestant and liberal historiography came from Willem Jan Frans Nuyens (1823–1894), who argued that Catholics could also be good patriots, and that many of them had fought on the Dutch side against the Spanish during the Revolt. Nuyens's main work Geschiedenis der Nederlandsche Beroerten in de XVIe eeuw ("History of the Netherlandish Troubles in the 16th Century"; Amsterdam, 1865–70, 8 volumes) was important for finding/retrieving the role of Dutch Catholics in the Revolt, and contributed to their emancipation. Contrasting his own situation to earlier times of Calvinist censorship against 'popish naughtiness', Nuyens (1869) expressed relief that he or fellow Catholic writers would not be 'arrested or thrown out of the country, not even risk being reviled as a bastard-Dutchman or somesuch. In that respect, we happily acknowledge, we must commended our Protestant fellow citizens. They have made a lot of progress in tolerance in recent years. Nowadays, they feel that anyone in the Netherlands may write what he deems to be true, including those who are in large part convinced that the history of the 16th century has had a very one-sided representation.'

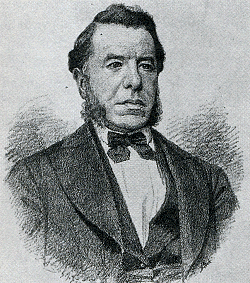
Robert Fruin (1823–1899)

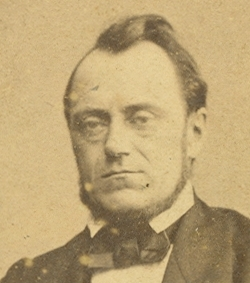
Nuyens (1823–1894)

Fruin's generally positive but critical review of Nuyens's Nederlandsche Beroerten in De Gids of August 1867 has become a classic. Fruin said the entire Dutch nation had a lot to learn from Nuyens's Catholic point of view, drawing attention to numerous issues he himself had missed, such as the Protestant biases of leading historiographers. Moreover, Fruin admitted that he had been carried away by John Lothrop Motley's Rise of the Dutch Republic: this Puritan American historian, whose work had been translated to Dutch by the liberal Bakhuizen van den Brink (who added an exciting introduction), had engaged in a systematic misrepresentation of a great deal of things, and that had to be corrected. Nuyens thus made essential contributions to Fruin's project of having a complete and balanced 'national' perspective on the Eighty Years' War. Fruin did object to four problematic aspects in the Nederlandsche Beroerten: Nuyens supposedly always contradicted whatever Protestant historians had said (deviating from literary convention); was overly harsh of Motley's book; had an undeservedly negative judgement of Orange's character and goal; and an incorrect view of causes of the Revolt. Nuyens attempted to defend himself against Fruin's criticism in 1869, while thanking Fruin for his balanced review and praising him: '...no more talented, no more honest history writer will one find in the Netherlands but [Fruin], who would never knowingly twist the truth.'

=== 20th century ===
==== Critical Catholic historians ====
Nevertheless, the style of Nuyens was later criticised as overly apologetical; his writings to promote the rights and equality of Dutch Catholics has been considered hardly self-critical nor source-critical compared to Fruin. In the early 20th century, Catholic historians increasingly valued the historical-critical method; they criticised Nuyens for not supporting many of his claims, and they pointed to Fruin as the example to be followed. In the mid-20th century, L.J. Rogier was the most influential Catholic historian; he vehemently rejected the apologetical Catholic historiography of the 19th century. Under the guise of 'Catholic emancipation', Rogier argued, Catholic historians had failed to be self-critical and to treat non-Catholics in the same way as they themselves wished to be treated as equal Dutch people.

==== Geographic and linguistic perspectives ====
J. Israel on the importance of Spanish sources

"You can't understand the period from the Dutch Revolt to the early 18th-century War of the Spanish Succession without insight into the Spanish sources. Those are very extensive. They are located in Madrid and Brussels. Therefore, a Dutch historian needs to cross the border if they want to learn about their past."

— Jonathan Israel (c. 2008)

In the early 20th century, Pieter Geyl brought a new perspective on the Revolt by arguing that Belgian and Dutch historians such as Henri Pirenne had been led astray by hindsight bias: they assumed that the eventual modern state borders between Belgium and the Netherlands were the result of the logical course of history, whereas it made more sense to Geyl if the state borders had coincided with the Franco–Dutch language border. Geyl managed to convince many of his colleagues that the major rivers were an important geographic barrier that allowed the Rebellion to sustain itself in Holland and Zeeland, that Luxemburg (on the Spanish Road) was the military basis of the Spanish forces, and that the eventual border between these northern and southern strongholds therefore fell somewhere in between at an arbitrary line 'where the generals had managed to advance for all sorts of reasons'. His assumption that the Dutch-language area in the Habsburg Netherlands had constituted a cultural unit upon which it would have made more sense to found a state – the so-called Greater Netherlands – was not widely adopted and sometimes countered, but his other insights proved valuable for Eighty Years' War studies, such as the Protestantisation of the Northern Netherlands. Unlike his staunch nationalist colleague Carel Gerretson, Geyl did not think one should still try to reunite modern Flanders and the Netherlands, and opposed a hypothetical partition of Belgium to achieve it, but did favour federalisation of Belgium.

In the late 20th century, British historians Geoffrey Parker and Jonathan Israel sought to demonstrate that many of the developments during the Dutch Revolt were impossible to understand but from an international perspective, and that one also needed to look at events through Spanish eyes.

C. Holland (2001) saw the Dutch Revolt as the seedbed of the major democratic revolutions from England, to America to France.

==== Socio-economic analyses ====
In the 1950s and 1960s, new ways of interpreting the various socio-economic processes during the war came to the fore. The driving forces behind the Revolt were variously identified as the role played by the Dutch Reformed Church in social organisation; the allegedly impoverished lesser nobility which rebelled against the threats to their privileges; or frustrations by the emerging middle classes that they were unable to obtain more political and economic power to match their increasing wealth, but instead faced heavier trade taxes. Though the lesser nobility and merchant class would cooperate in their rebellion, the former would decline and the latter acquire a dominating position in the Republic. Historians would eventually agree that a defining feature of arguments used by various rebel factions was that they invoked medieval privileges, regional autonomy and a freer market in support of their resistance to the Spanish government, championing a return to the old ways, but ended up non-deliberately creating 'an entirely new form of government' due to a consensus reached by the leaders of the Revolt. Even though the Dutch Republic was thus a modern polity without a hereditary head of state, the Revolt was not a forward-looking modern revolution which sought to break with the past, but a classical revolution which idealised the past.

== Name and periodisation ==
=== Length and the phrase Eighty Years' War ===
In traditional historiography, the war has long been called the Eighty Years' War (Dutch: Tachtigjarige Oorlog; Spanish: guerra de los Ochenta Años; guerra de Flandes; French: guerre de Quatre-Vingts Ans; German: Achtzigjähriger Krieg; Italian: guerra degli ottant'anni), and dated from the Battle of Heiligerlee (23 May 1568) to the Peace of Münster (15 May 1648), thereby amounting to roughly eighty years. In the 20th century, historians came to consider this dating to be "completely arbitrary", with the Winkler Prins (2002) stating: 'One could just as easily claim that this 'war' already began somewhere between 1555 and 1568 (the 'Prelude' in the naming of R.J. Fruin), or in 1572 (first meeting of rebel cities), in 1576 (Pacification of Ghent), 1579 (Union of Utrecht), or in 1581 (Act of Abjuration).' Of course, nobody knew ahead of time when the war would end, and thus how long it would last, as Dutch comedian Theo Maassen humorously pointed out in 2007: 'I don't think that during the Eighty Years' War, someone said after forty years: "Finally, we are half way!"' Nevertheless, during the war, people seem to have had roughly similar ideas about when the war started, and how long it had been ongoing so far. On 20 September 1629, Carlos Coloma wrote in a letter to the Count-Duke of Olivares: 'The heavy blows we had to endure in just this one, past year, have had a greater impression on the population here than all the misfortunes of 63 years of war put together', meaning that he counted from 1566. In 1641, in the first volume of the Nederlandsche Historien, Hooft wrote: een oorlogh (...), dat nu in 't drientzeventighste jaar gevoert wort ("a war (...), that is now conducted in its seventy-third year"), meaning that he counted from 1568. Groenveld (2020) concluded that this discrepancy indictated that contemporaries did not exactly agree on when hostilities broke out, in part because at no point 'war' had been formally declared: 'The term "Eighty Years'" didn't possess mathematical precision, but was an approximate designation. And "War" had a broader meaning than just "large-scale and officially declared armed conflict".' For legal purposes, Article 56 of the Peace of Münster (signed 30 January 1648, ratified 15 May 1648) defined 1567 as the year in which the war started:

Dutch text (Peace of Münster, Article 56)	French text (Peace of Münster, Article 56)	English translation
Den tijt die gelopen heeft gedurende den oorloch te beginnen sedert den jare vijftienhondert seven en sestich tot den aenvanck vanden twaalfjarigen Trefves, als mede den tijt die gelopen heeft sedert de expiratie vande geleijde trefves tot het besluijt van dit tractaet, en sal niet werden gereeckent oom ijemand daermede te vercorten, ofte andersints te prejudicieren.	Le temps qui a couru pendant la guerra á comancer depuis l'annee mil cinq cent soixante sept iusques au comancement dela Trefve de douze ans, comme aussy le temps, qui a couru depuis l'expiration de la ditte Trefve iusques á la conclusion de ce traité, ne sera compté, pour par ce moyen donner preiudices, ou dommage á quelqu'un.	The time which has run during the war beginning from the year fifteen hundred and sixty-seven until the commencement of the Twelve Years' Truce, as well as the time which has run since the expiration of the said Truce until the conclusion of this treaty, will not be counted as a means to prejudice or harm anyone.

The Dutch States General, for dramatic effect, decided to promulgate the ratification of the Peace of Münster (which was actually ratified by them on 15 May 1648) on the 80th anniversary of the execution of the Counts of Egmont and Horne (5 June 1568), namely, 5 June 1648. Within decades, the uncapitalised phrase "eighty years' war" became established in the literature of various European languages, such as:

- Spanish: Francisco Dávila Orejón y Gastón, Politica y mecánica militar para sargento mayor de tercio (1669): "(experimentado en mas de ochenta anos, que se continuô la guerra en Flandes)" ("(experienced in more than eighty years, that the war in Flanders continued)")
- Dutch: Pieter Valckenier, 't Verwerd Europa (1675): "Waar uyt ontstont den tachentig jaarigen en onversoenlyken Oorlog tusschen de Spanjaarden en de Vereenigde Nederlanders?" ("Where did the eighty years' and irreconcilable war between the Spaniards and the United Netherlandish [people] originate from?")
  - German translation: Pieter Valckenier, Das verwirrte Europa (1677): "Woraus ist doch der achtzig jährige / und unversühnliche Krieg / zwischen Spanien und dem Vereinigten Niedrlande / entstanden?" ("But where did the eighty years' / and irreconcilable war / between Spain and the United Netherlands / originate from?")
- French: La Vie du Michel de Ruyter (1677): "Mess. les Etats ont û une guerre de quatrevingt ans, mais pendant tout ce temps-là le Roy d'Espagne n'a jamais entrepris une telle injustice..." ("The Lords Estates had had a war of eighty years, but during all this time the King of Spain has never undertaken such an injustice....")
- Italian: Pietro Gazzotti, Historia delle guerre d'Europa arriuate dall'anno 1643 fino al 1680. (1681): "...la fermezza, con cui gli Olandesi havevano sostenuto più di ottant'anni la guerra con la Spagna, era per dare riputatione alle loro armi, e tirare ne'loro interessi molti Principi, ch'erano gelosi della Francia." ("... the firmness with which the Hollanders had sustained for more than eighty years the war with Spain, was to give reputation to their arms, and to draw in their interests many Princes, who were jealous of France.")
- Dutch: t'Verloste Nederland van het Spaense, en Franse jok (1690): "Door dese Doorluchtige Princen is eyndelijck dien swaren tachtigjarigen oorlog, die de Nederlanden met Spanje gehad hebben, en die de Spaense seven en twintig duysent, seven hondert en veertig tonnen gouts gekost heeft soo geluckelijck ten eynde gebracht." ("Because of these Illustrious Princes, that severe eighty years' war, which the Netherlands have had with Spain, and which has cost the Spanish 27,740 tonnes of gold, was finally so fortunately brought to an end.")

Although the name "Eighty Years' War" and the starting year of 1568 would thus come to dominate historiography, they would be challenged by the alternative names "Dutch Revolt" or simply "the Revolt", and earlier dates such as 1566 or 1567, in the 20th century.

=== "Eighty Years' War" versus "Dutch Revolt" ===
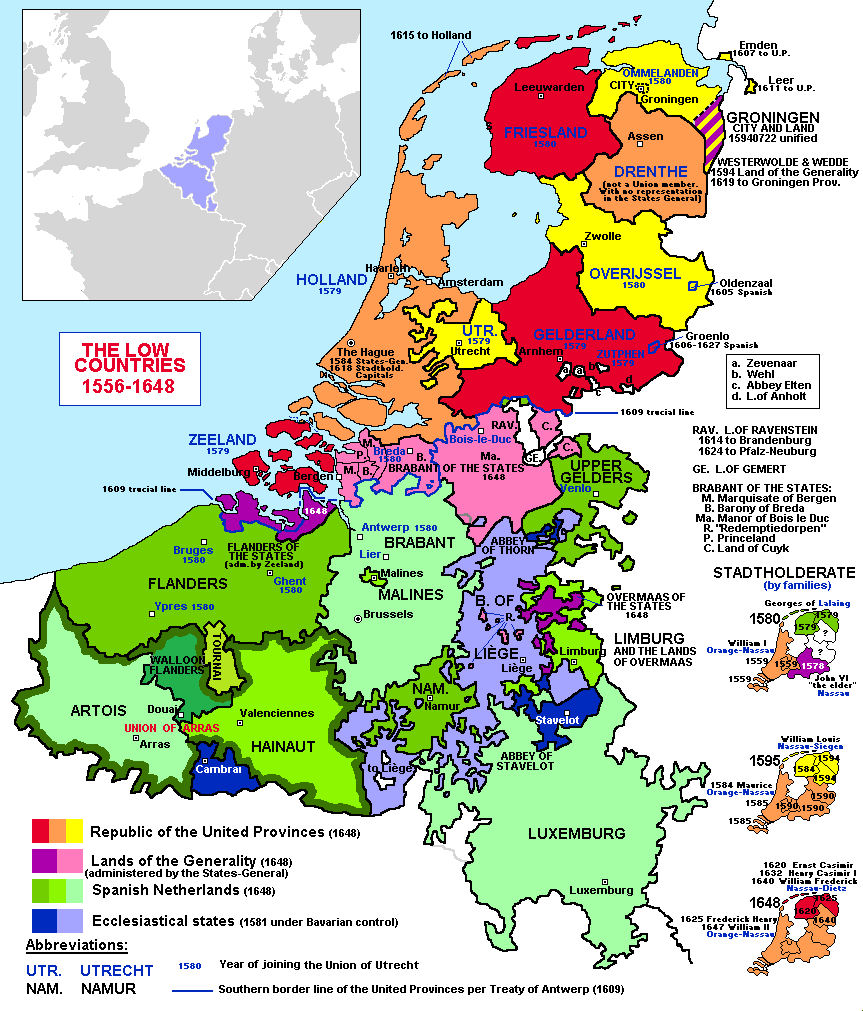
Map indicating various processes of state formation and the stadtholderate during the Eighty Years' War

In part because of the arbitrary dating of the war's beginning, and thus the total length of eighty years upon which the war's name is based, some historians have endeavoured to replace the term Eighty Years' War with Dutch Revolt (Dutch: Nederlandse Opstand) or simply the Revolt (Dutch: de Opstand), while other historians have sought to apply Dutch Revolt only to an initial part of the war, or to the prelude of the war. Some examples include:

- Anton van der Lem (1995): The Revolt in the Netherlands (1568–1609)
- Arie van Deursen (2004): "The Revolt of 1572–1584."
- Mulder et al. (2008): "The Dutch Revolt, 1559–1609"
- Anton van der Lem (2014): The Revolt in de Netherlands 1568–1648: The Eighty Years' War in Words and Images.

In a 2019 official history produced under the direction of the Netherlands Institute of Military History, the authors contend that "Dutch Revolt" is a misnomer if applied to the entire span of the war, as only the first phase of the Eighty Years' War unfolded as an internecine conflict across the breadth of the Netherlands, driven by class and sectarian dynamics, between loyalists and dissident subjects in "revolt" against their sovereign ruler. What followed, they argue, was a regular war between a de facto independent, territorially-bounded nation-state — the Dutch provinces united by the Union of Utrecht — and the territorially contiguous possession of a multinational empire — Spain as dynastic ruler of the remaining Habsburg Netherlands — across a defined and relatively static frontier.

=== Focus on the first part ===
Historians have manifested a tendency to focus on the first part of the war, regarding the death of Orange in 1584, the year 1588 (various reasons), or the Truce of 1609 to be turning points, after which they considered it no longer important or interesting to narrate subsequent events of the war to the same level of detail, either because these events are said to have had far less military significance for the result of the war in 1648, or far less significance for the further political, institutional, religious, cultural, or socio-economic history of the northern Netherlands or the Dutch people up to the present.

- Significance to military outcome: Robert Fruin (1857) noted that history writers had a tendency to write only about the early part of the conflict until the assassination of William of Orange in 1584 (and lay people likewise only remembered this early part well), while this was in no way a turning point of the war; in Fruin's view, it was not until the Ten Years (1588–1598) that the 'victory'/independence of the northern Netherlands as the Dutch Republic was secured. (Note: 'The Eighty Years' War is the best-known part of our history (...), but even from this period, only the beginning is commonly known; with the death of Prince William [in 1584], the coherent knowledge of most people fades; they only remember a few loose facts about what happened after. (...) Likewise, the historiographers are too focused on the first period. The war, which was not too much for the ancestors to sustain, becomes too long for them to narrate. They reach for the Truce, which they already see from afar, and all too quickly skip over that which preceded it. And it is exactly in the meantime that the great case was settled, and our people's existence was established.') Winkler Prins (2002) stated: "One could argue that the struggle between the Republic and Spain was actually already decided by or during the Twelve Years' Truce (1609–1621), although the borders weren't yet clear."
- Significance to further (non-military) Dutch history: In the introduction to the second volume of his four-volume History of the Dutch People, in which he had to leave out lots of things to control 'the work's size', Petrus Johannes Blok (1896) admitted that he struggled with keeping his narration of the war's first half brief: 'The size of the first part, which deals with the first half of the Eighty Years' War, has nevertheless already become larger than intended. While writing, the author came to the point of view that it was impossible to abridge the story of events, the outline of circumstances in this time so rich in changes, without damaging the proper understanding of the entire development of our people's existence.' (Note: Blok explained why he couldn't abridge the first half: 'The sieges of Haarlem, Alkmaar, Leiden and Antwerp, the campaigns of prince William and prince Maurice are not just of great importance to military history: they are neatly interwoven with the entire people's history. The complex course of changes in the political and religious spheres had to be described in detail in order to show clearly how a free Republic was formed out of the nascent Burgundian Monarchy. Nor was it possible to speak briefly about the way in which during the war the foundations were laid in the North for the flourishing of trade and industry, which developed on such a grand scale in the 17th century.') To Van der Lem (1995), the entire post-1588 period was less interesting to recount because the ideological struggle had essentially been decided: 'As soon as [the 1588 States-General's decision to wage offensive war] had been taken, the continuation of the 'Revolt' or 'Eighty Years' War' became a regulated war. The ideological element did retain a role, but disappeared to the background. (...) The course of the struggle is henceforth a military one, in which not all conquests and losses need be remembered.' Van der Lem (1995) ended his narrative in 1609, and not until 2014 did he publish a new edition of his 1995 book in which the narrative was extended to 1648. (Note: "This text appeared in 1995 at Uitgeverij Kosmos in Utrecht under the title: The Revolt in the Netherlands (1568–1609) (sold out) and has been corrected and supplemented here. An entirely new text was published on 24 October 2014 by Vantilt Publishers in Nijmegen under the title: The Revolt in de Netherlands 1568–1648: The Eighty Years' War in Words and Images.")

The chaotic and dramatic early decades of the Eighty Years' War, which were filled with civil revolts and large-scale urban massacres, largely ended for the provinces north of the Great Rivers after they proclaimed the Republic in 1588, expelled the Spanish forces and established peace, safety and prosperity for their population. Conventional historiography has a tendency to gloss over the rest of the war, and focus on the economic flourishing of especially the province of Holland in the subsequent so-called Dutch Golden Age. However, modern historians have taken issue with this shift in focus, as the countryside in especially Brabant, Flanders and the lands constituting the modern two provinces of Belgian and Dutch Limburg continued to be devastated by decades of uninterrupted warfare, with armies forcing farmers to hand over their food, or destroying their crops to deny food to the enemy. Both parties levied taxes on farmers in the still-contested environs of 's-Hertogenbosch after the Dutch conquered it in 1629. Towns such as Helmond, Eindhoven and Oisterwijk were repeatedly subjected to pillaging, arson, and sexual violence committed by both rebel and royal forces. These atrocities and tragedies in the borderlands, scholars say, should not be ignored, let alone should it be implied that the 'Golden Age' was experienced by everyone in (what would become) the Dutch Republic.

=== Periodisation ===
Until the mid-20th century, 1568 was generally assumed as the year in which the war started. A new point of view regarding the early years of the conflict emerged in the 1960s, with Belgian historian Herman Van der Wee (1969) stating:

'...historical research of the last few years has brought to light that the traditional vision, in which the year 1568 is presupposed as the starting date of the Revolt [Presser 1948], should be amended somewhat [Enno van Gelder 1930, Kuttner 1964, Brulez 1954]. The Revolt of the Westkwartier in the autumn of 1566, an uprising that concretised in a gathering of troops in and around Tournai and in the advance of a Geuzen army towards Valenciennes which was besieged by royal troops, was already the result of an organised programme of action, [devised] for a political purpose by ministers and members of the lesser nobles [Brulez 1954, p. 85]. The Beeldenstorm in the summer of 1566 also had a strongly organisational character, which was not without political motives [Dierickx 1966]. Therefore, I am in favour of viewing the initial phase of the Revolt as a troubled period of unrest, which is situated between 1566 and 1568.'

Strada 1632–47	Hooft 1642–54	Fruin c.1860	Nuyens 1860s	Blok 1896	Geyl 1937	Israel 1995	Van der Lem 1995	Parker 2002	Winkler Prins 2002	Mulder et al. 2008	Tracy 2008	Groenveld 2009	Groenveld et al. 2020	English Wikipedia
1555–1578; 1578–1590	1555–1584; 1584–1587	(1555–1567); 1567–1576; 1576–1588/9; 1588/9–1598; 1598–?	(1559–1567); 1567–1576; 1576–1584; 1584–1598	1567–1584; 1584–1609; 1609–1621; 1621–1648	(1555–1572); 1567–1572; 1572–1576; 1576–1580; 1580–1609 (1609–1621) (1621–1648)	1477–1588; 1588–1647; 1647–1701 (1702–1806)	(1467–1555); 1555–1567; 1567–1573; 1573–1576; 1576–1584; 1584–1609	(1549–1565); 1565–1568; 1569–1576; 1576–1581; 1581–1589; 1589–1609	1566–1576; 1576–1588; 1588–1609 (1609–1621); 1621–1648	1559–1567; 1567–1573; 1573–1588; 1588–1609 (1609–1621) (1621–1648)	1549–1567 (1567–1572); 1572–1576; 1576–1582; 1583–1588 (c. 1590–1650)	1560–1572; 1572–1575/6; 1575/6–1579; 1579–1588; 1588–1598; 1598–1606; 1606–1609; 1609–1621; 1621–1648	(1559–1567); 1567–1575; 1575–1581; 1581–1588; 1588–1609; 1609–1619; 1619–1625; 1625–1633; 1634–1639; 1640–1648 (1648–1650)	(Origins, c. 1555–1566); Eighty Years' War, 1566–1572; Eighty Years' War, 1572–1576; Eighty Years' War, 1576–1579; Eighty Years' War, 1579–1588; Ten Years (1588–1598); Eighty Years' War, 1599–1609; Twelve Years' Truce (1609–1621); Eighty Years' War, 1621–1648 (Aftermath, c. 1648–1650/72)

== Causes and motives ==
Algemeen Rijksarchivaris Martin Berendse stated in 2009: 'Much has already been written about [the Eighty Years' War], and just as often attempts have been made to characterise it: a revolt against the legal authorities, a religious war, a struggle for independence, a European war, a struggle for free trade.'

The Eighty Years' War is often seen by historians as a religious war, although other descriptions are possible besides "religious war". (Note: 'The Eighty Years' War was not primarily a religious war, but religious conflicts did play an important role: Catholic Spain against the Protestant – or rather the Protestant-run – Netherlands, and inside the Netherlands itself the strict Calvinists against the more liberal Arminians, who – just like the Erasmians inside the Catholic Church – were influenced by a freethinking and tolerant Renaissance spirit.')

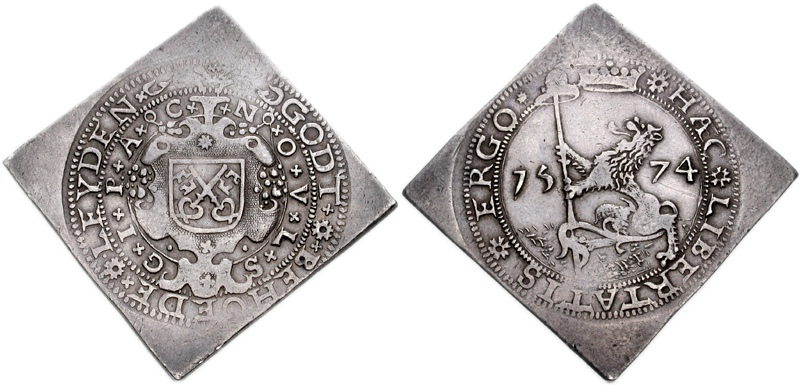
Coin from the siege of Leiden. The reverse side (left) states in Dutch: "May God protect Leiden". The obverse side (right) states in Latin: "This is about liberty". (Note: The reverse side also features an abbreviation in the inner circle: N. O. V. L. S. G. I. P. A. C. (Nummus Obsessae Vrbis Lugduni Sub Gubernatione Illustrissimi Principis Auraici Cusus), Latin for "Coin stamped in the besieged city of Leiden under the governance of the most illustrious Prince of Orange".)

Even during the war, there were fierce and sometimes violent arguments amongst the rebels about why they were fighting. For example, during the 1573–1574 Siege of Leiden, the city government issued temporary coins with the slogan haec libertatis ergo ("this is about liberty"). In a 19 December 1573 church sermon, preacher Taling rebuked the city magistrate, comparing them to pigs and asserting the coins should have said haec religionis ergo ("this is about religion"). Secretary Jan van Hout was furious, pulled out his gun and asked mayor Pieter Adriaansz. van der Werff sitting next to him whether to shoot the dominee, but the mayor calmed him down. According to Grotius (1612), the primary motive for the Revolt was not the struggle for faith (that is, orthodox Calvinism), but the (sometimes selfish) political considerations of the cities, nobility and provinces, namely, the maintenance of their privileges and serving their own (financial) interests. It has been suspected that the States of Holland, who commissioned Grotius' book, refused to publish it because they disagreed with this perspective on the war.

19th-century historians (as well as some like Henri Pirenne in the early 20th century) were often influenced by nationalism, regarding the war as one between two "nations" (the Netherlandish/Dutch people versus the Spaniards). But by the late 20th century, all scholars had abandoned this perspective: the Revolt was rather a war between civilians than an interstate war. Due to the nature of the conflict, the factions involved, and changing alliances, modern-day historians have put forward arguments that the Dutch Revolt was also a civil war. H.A. Enno van Gelder hypothesised that the Revolt had a politically progressive character, leading the way forward 'directly to the constitutional monarchy of the 19th century', but most historians have rejected his argumentation. Instead, Geyl, Rogier and others argued that the Revolt was motivated by conservatism: the privileged estates were resisting the modern phenomenon of a state trying to establish an absolute monarchy. Later historians such as J.W. Smit and Geoffrey Parker agreed with this latter point of view.

L.J. Rogier (1947) wrote that the importance of religious motives varied throughout the war: although the Eighty Years' War would not have started because of religion, that would become the most important reason for its continuation because of "uproar of Calvinists". At the Truce negotiations in 1608, the revolt had already evolved so much to a war of religion that the Austrian archduke and archduchess were prepared to renounce their sovereignty over the United Provinces in exchange for their demand of complete freedom of worship for the Catholic religion in the North, thus putting religious interests above political ones. Van der Lem (1995) stated: 'The Revolt in the Netherlands or Eighty Years' War (...) was about three fundamental rights pertaining to all times, all countries, and – unfortunately – have lost nothing in relevance: about the freedom of religion and conscience, the right to self-determination, and the right to co-determination' (representatives having a say in decision-making).

Groenveld (2020) stated that the 'extraordinary result' of the war had not been envisioned by anyone at the start. 'All intended goals had been far more limited. Each one had manifested within a group of proponents, which had proven to be too weak to accomplish something definitive on its own. That goes for the efforts to establish a monopolish Calvinist church, to counter the Habsburg centralisation policies and the defence of endangered privileges, to maintain the power of both the greater and lesser nobility, [and] the attempts to definitively remove foreign troops.' Only because all these dissatisfied groups gradually joined forces over time in their struggle against the sovereign's advisors, and eventually the sovereign himself, with many unexpected turns of events, this result could come about. Quoting Hooft, Groenveld stated that the conflict had elements of civil war, revolt against lawful authority, and religious war.

== Alleged Cateau-Cambrésis Catholic conspiracy ==
It has been alleged that in the Treaty of Cateau-Cambrésis (1559), or in a secret clause or separate agreement made around the same time, the kings Henry II of France and Philip II of Spain agreed to a Catholic alliance to exterminate all Protestant 'heretics' in their realms and the rest of Europe. In part, this belief serves as an explanation why the kings decided to end the Italian War of 1551–1559 between them at Cateau-Cambrésis in 1559, and why devastating wars of religion broke out in both kingdoms (the French Wars of Religion and the Eighty Years' War) in subsequent decades. Some historians think that this royal Catholic conspiracy to exterminate all European Protestants is historical, other historians have concluded that it never existed, and is part of Protestant propaganda that was especially promoted by William of Orange in his 1580 Apology.

=== Religious contents of the Treaty ===
Some historians have claimed that all signatories of the treaty needed to 'purge their lands of heresy'; in other words, all their subjects had to be forcefully reverted to Catholicism. Visconti (2003), for example, claimed that when pressured by Spain to implement this obligation, Emmanuel Philibert, Duke of Savoy proclaimed the Edict of Nice (15 February 1560), prohibiting Protestantism on pains of a large fine, enslavement or banishment, which soon led to an armed revolt by the Protestant Waldensians in his domain that would last until July 1561. However, modern historians disagree about the primary motives of Philip II of Spain and especially Henry II of France to conclude this peace treaty. Because Henry II had told the Parlement of Paris that the fight against heresy required all his strength and thus he needed to establish peace with Spain, Lucien Romier (1910) argued that, besides the great financial troubles, 'that the religious motive of Henry had great, if not decisive, weight'. According to Rainer Babel (2021), this was 'a judgement which later research, with some nuances in detail, has not refuted', stating however that Bertrand Haan (2010) had 'a deviating interpretation' challenging this consensus. Haan (2010) argued that finances were more important than domestic religious dissension; the fact that the latter were prominent in the 1560s in both France and Spain may have led historians astray in emphasising the role of religion in the 1559 treaty. Megan Williams (2011) summarised: 'Indeed, Haan contends, it was not the treaty itself but its subsequent justifications which stoked French religious strife. The treaty's priority, he argues, was not a Catholic alliance to extirpate heresy but the affirmation of its signatories' honor and amity, consecrated by a set of dynastic marriages.' According to Haan, there is no evidence of a Catholic alliance between France and Spain to eradicate Protestantism, even though some contemporaries have pointed to the treaty's second article to argue such an agreement existed: 'The second article expresses the wish to convene an oecumenical council. People, the contemporaries first, have concluded that the agreement sealed the establishment of a united front of Philip II and Henry II against Protestantism in their states as in Europe. The analysis of the progress of the talks shows that this was not the case.'

Pope Pius V raised the Florentine duke Cosimo de' Medici to Grand Duke of Tuscany in 1569, which was confirmed by the emperor, although Philip II of Spain disapproved. Although the Papacy's diplomatic role increased during the Wars of Religion, popes and papal legates played no role in negotiating the most significant truces and treaties between the Habsburg and Valois monarchs during these wars.

=== Testimony in Orange's Apology ===
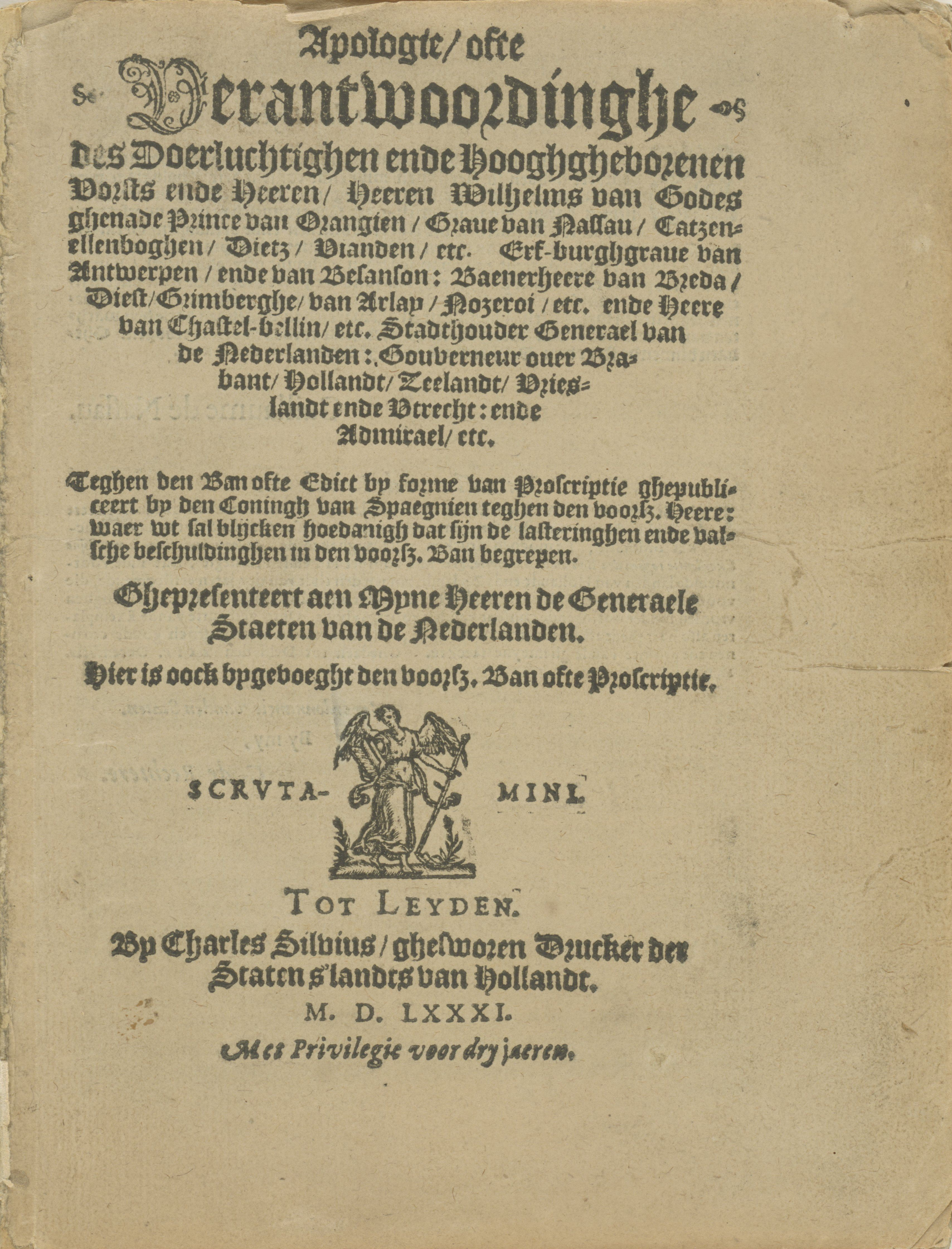
Printed 1581 Dutch version of Orange's Apology, in which he alleged the conspiracy 20 years later

Despite this, Dutch historiographers have long assumed that such an alliance between the two Catholic monarchs was concluded during the peace talks at Le Cateau, albeit in secret, mostly because William of Orange made claims to that extent in his December 1580 Apology (written in his own defence after Philip II of Spain imposed the royal ban on him in March 1580, publicly calling for the assassination of Orange in return for a large reward). In the Apology, Orange alleged that, when he, Alba and Egmont were held as hostages in France in June 1559 to ensure the implementation of the Treaty of Cateau-Cambrésis, the following event occurred when he had a meeting with Henry II of France while the latter was on a hunt:

...while being in France, I've heard from the own mouth of King Henry, that the Duke of Alba employed means to exterminate all the suspects of Religion in France, in this Country, and throughout all of Christendom. (Note: Original French text: "...quand estant en France j'eus entendu de la propre bouche du Roy Henry, que le Duc d'Alve traictoit des moyens pour exterminer tous les suspects de la Religion en France, en ce Pays et par toute la Chrestienté...) When the king had outlined the main goal of the Spanish Council and the intention of the Spanish king and the duke of Alba, I pretended that I was already informed on the matter. This caused him to continue with an elaborate narration, from which I was able to sufficiently deduce the intention of the inquisitors. I would happily like to confess that at that moment, I felt a great compassion for so many people of honour, who had been delivered to death; furthermore, I felt sympathy with this country, with which I am so connected and where one thought to introduce a certain kind of inquisition, which would be more cruel than the Spanish. This Spanish inquisition was a trap to entangle both the Noblemen of the land and the people. Those, who could not be subjected by the Spaniards and their adherents by other means, would surely have easily fallen into their hands through this inquisition, from which escape is impossible. After all, you only had to look at a holy statue with contempt in order to be burnt at the stake. Moreover, I confess that at that moment, I resolved in all seriousness, that I would do my utmost to help expel this Spanish rabble, which I have not regretted up to this very moment.

Some historiographers doubt the historicity of this meeting. Van der Lem (1995) stated: "In later years, Orange spread a fable about this stay [in France]. (...) In reality, Orange's thoughts were hardly on matters of religion then: his wife Anna van Buren had died the year before and he was busy looking for a suitable, wealthy second wife, Catholic or Protestant, it didn't matter. The conversation with King Henry II has been added to the Prince's Apology, a propaganda piece in which he subsequently justified his actions in 1580. Klink (1997) stated that the arguments for denial are not strong. Bertrand Haan (2010), however, argued that 'the authenticity of this allegation cannot be determined'; although Alba would later act in a way that is compatible with such a plan to exterminate all Protestants, Henry II seemed not to act on it at all. It may well be that this testimony had merely been a way for Orange 'to blacken Alba's reputation, and more generally to denounce the irreconcilable and tyrannical tendencies of the Spanish government as a whole.' On the other hand, René van Stipriaan (2021) claimed: 'In recent times, the doubts about the historicity of this story have significantly decreased.' In any case, Orange would have been present at Henry's deathbed in early July 1559. (Note: 'Henry was on the brink of death with high fevers for more than a week, during which William of Orange was one of the few allowed to pay him another visit. The king died on 10 July.')

=== Other claims of Spanish Inquisition in the Netherlands ===
In connection with the simultaneous papal bull Super Universas (12 May 1559), Van der Lem (1995) remarked: "The secrecy that came about with the ecclesiastical reorganisation fed rumours that the king was also going to introduce the so-called Spanish Inquisition in the Netherlands. About few institutions in history such great fables and absurdities have been told as the Spanish Inquisition. (...) All of this is part of the so-called Black Legend, the whole of imaginary stories that were doing and still do the rounds about Spanish history. (Swart 1975) In reality, the Spanish Inquisition was never introduced in the Netherlands, nor did Philip II intend to introduce it in the Netherlands." There was only a short-lived attempt at establishing a papal (Roman) inquisition in the Netherlands in 1522, which never amounted to much.

== Role of main players ==
=== Margaret of Parma ===
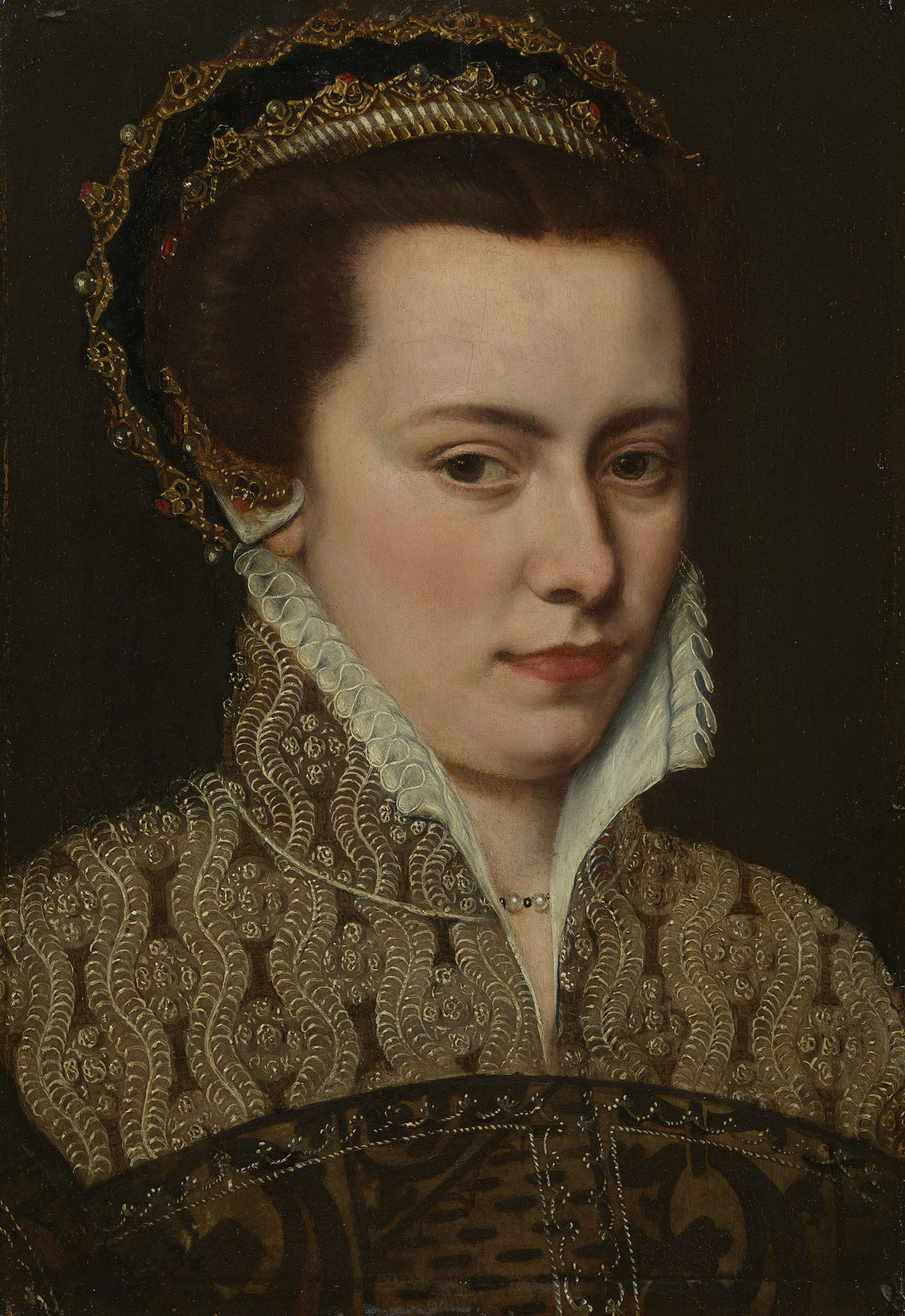
Margaret of Parma by anonymous (c. 1560)

Margaret of Parma, governor-general of the Habsburg Netherlands (1559–1567), has received a mixed scholarly reception. Winkler Prins (2002) regarded her as 'not very independent in general', as the powerful men in her political milieu repeatedly compelled her to act differently than she had intended. 'She acquiesced to the advice of cardinal Antoine Perrenot de Granvelle, until she suspected him of not supporting her dynastic interests (the marriage of her son Alexander Farnese to an Austrian princess and the return of Piacenza) to the king.' After Granvelle's departure in 1564, Winkler Prins stated that the noblemen's interference with her government 'increased the chaos in the land', and that Margaret was 'filled with fear, and forced to compromise'. It was thanks to the outrage caused by the Beeldenstorm that the noblemen finally respected her authority: 'Henceforth powerfully supported by Peter Ernst von Mansfeld, Noircarmes, Arenberg and Megen, Margaret managed to restore order.' It concluded that Philip's sending of Alba to the Netherlands was 'an unfortunate and unnecessary measure' that led her to resign from office and leave for Italy on 30 December 1567.

Van der Lem (1995) stated that Margaret's status as an illegitimate daughter of Charles V with Johanna Maria van der Gheynst, and thus the half-sister of Philip II, risked undermining her authority: 'It depended on the good disposition with which one wished to judge her, whether one remembered her illegitimate birth or her descent from Emperor Charles.' He rejected the view of traditional historiography that, through the Council of State, Viglius, Berlaymont and especially Granvelle could easily control Margaret, but although they frequently advised the governoress, this merely created 'the illusion that a clique of three people was running the show'. Contrary to what nationalist historians have implied, Van der Lem said, this woman and these three men were not 'Spanish', but born in the Netherlands and Free Burgundy (Granvelle); they were neither necessarily 'pro-Spanish' nor 'anti-national'. The only person who could really overrule Margaret was king Philip, which he did with the first two Letters from the Segovia Woods (October 1565); this put the governoress at odds with the nobility, who had demanded several moderations of anti-heresy policies that Philip had now all rejected. According to legend, when the Compromise of Nobles offered Margaret the petition on 5 April 1566, again demanding to moderate the persecution of Protestants, she was nervous and hesitant, leading Berlaymont to say: 'N'ayez pas peur, Madame, ce ne sont que des gueux' ("Do not fear, Madam, they are mere beggars"), the origin of the term geuzen. Otherwise Van der Lem agreed with Winkler Prins that the Beeldenstorm outrage regained her the nobility's loyalty and thereby the ability to crush the unrest herself, but Philip already sent Alba with a Spanish army before he was informed that Margaret had succeeded.

=== Philip II of Spain ===
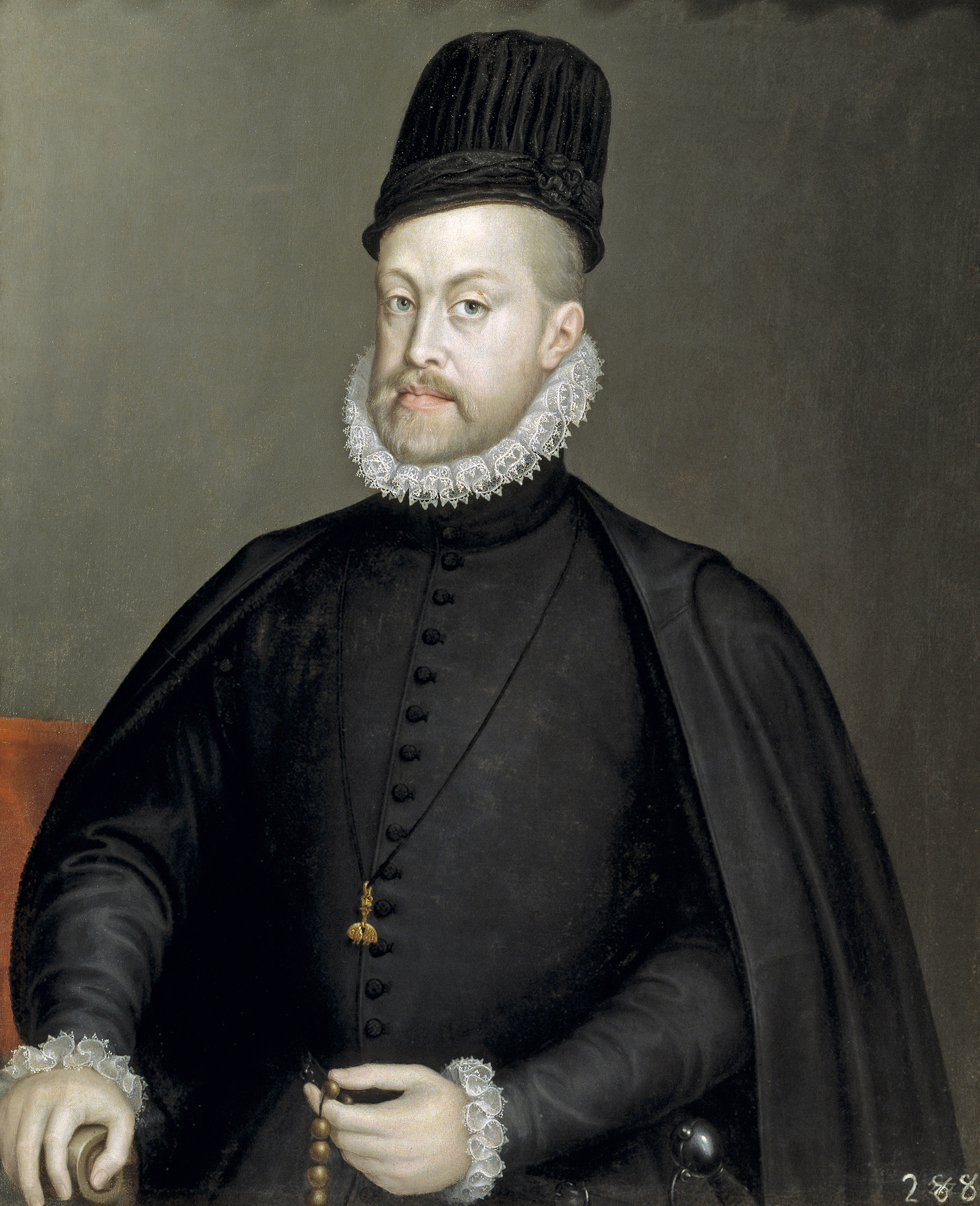
Philip II of Spain portrayed by Sofonisba Anguissola (1573)

Mulder et al. (2008) regarded Philip II of Spain's planned tax reforms as reasonable for a 'modern ruler' in the face of unstable revenues, high expenditures and repeated bankruptcy crises in the second half of the 16th century: 'It was very much in the interest of Philip to be able to introduce regular taxes rather than beden. A modern ruler – in the 16th century, therefore, an absolute monarch – had to have access to sufficient finances.' Similarly, they regarded criticism of Alba's implementation of Philip's tax reforms as 'unjustified'.

According to Fruin (1857), the turning point in the war that started the Dutch Republic's greatest Ten Years (1588–1598) was a military one that was to be blamed primarily on Philip's errors. The destruction of the Spanish Armada (May–August 1588) began the 'adversity which Philip would suffer almost without interruptions from now on, which is to be attributed more to his own mistakes than the cooperation of his enemies. (...) The attack on England, waged recklessly, fell apart, and prevented the submission of the Netherlands.' Kosterman (1999), too, blamed Philip for appointing the inexperienced and incompetent Medina-Sidonia as admiral of the Armada, while sending his very competent general Parma to invade France, 'thus spoiling his chances of still subduing the rebellious Northern Netherlands, a task that Parma had been carrying out with great success before the Armada.'

=== Duke of Alba ===
Fernando Álvarez de Toledo, 3rd Duke of Alba, better known simply as Alba, came to the Netherlands with the Army of Flanders in August 1567 to restore order and shortly afterwards succeeded Margaret of Parma as governor-general (1567–1573). Mulder et al. (2008) remarked: 'Alba has become the bogeyman in our [Dutch] national history. As for his taxation plans [this is] certainly unjustified. The hopelessly outdated beden had to be abolished urgently. [However,] his harsh treatment of rebels rightly earned him his nickname 'iron duke'.' Kosterman (1999) even regarded the immediate collection of the Tenth Penny as 'necessary to finance the Spanish army', which was threatening mutiny due to lack of pay. Meanwhile, the States of the various provinces obstructed or delayed even the most reasonable compromises, and sabotaged the eventual mid-1571 full-on Tenth Penny introduction 'in all possible, sometimes very childish ways.' Nevertheless, Alba proved incompetent to introduce these necessary tax reforms, which he appears to have admitted by requesting king Philip II at the end of every letter to him to send a successor to take over his job as governor-general. He also vainly tried to force the matter upon the city of Brussels's populace by closing their shops and threatening to execute 17 prominent burghers in early 1572.

=== William of Orange ===
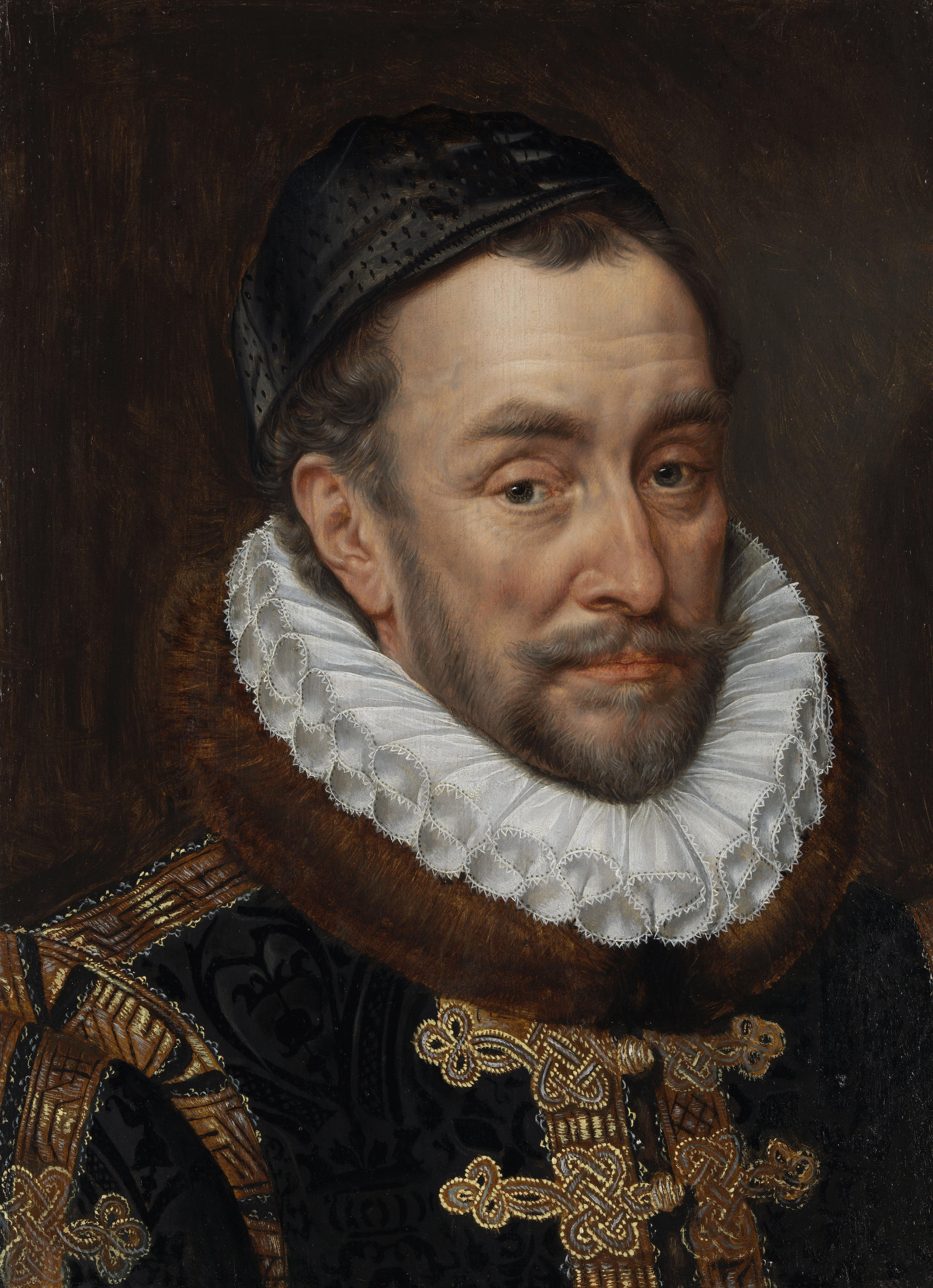
Portrait by Adriaen Thomasz. Key, c. 1570 – c. 84

William "the Silent" of Orange is probably the most controversial figure of the Eighty Years' War, with commentators approaching him with a wide variety of views. These perspectives have ranged from considering Orange a man of God, to the Father of the Fatherland (Pater Patriae) of the Netherlands, to a great benefactor of his country, to one of the founders of modern human rights principles such freedom of conscience and freedom of religion, to an opportunist without principles, down to a war criminal, or even an anti-Christian heretic who was justly assassinated by a pious, God-fearing Catholic. Historians from all backgrounds have struggled to come up with an evidence-based, balanced evaluation of who Orange was, what he did or tried to accomplish, and what his place in history ought to be.

Frederiks (1999) stated: 'During the 1570s, Orange had continuously attempted to get the rebel provinces in agreement in their resistance against the king. That way they would evidently be strongest, and prevent Philip from pitting them against each other. [But] Orange was faced with an impossible mission, so great were the mutual opposites in the Netherlands. (...) A second goal that Orange had set himself, and on which the rebellion's success largely depended, was to get France involved in the struggle. If this powerful country with its mighty potential would militarily back the rebels, it would be done deal.' Although Orange managed to get the States-General to accept the French king's brother and heir presumptive Francis, Duke of Anjou as their new sovereign on 23 January 1581, 'yet Orange's plan was only half successful: Holland and Zeeland did not participate, as they refused to even consider subjecting themselves to a lord who was a Catholic.' Moreover, the other States would also be in constant conflict with Anjou.

After years of conducting a pro-French policy and trying to secure Anjou's position as the new monarch of the Netherlands and getting French military support, Orange lost a great deal of power and influence due to the French Fury (17 January 1583). Save from a few allies, Van der Lem (1995) stated that Orange had become 'an isolated political figure' amidst the overwhelmingly critical rebel leadership, and was even deserted by his brother and long-time ally Jan van Nassau, as he kept insisting on reconciling with Anjou and obtaining French intervention. Van der Lem (1995) regarded the assassination of William of Orange in 1584 as a turning point, arguing that his political and religious ideals died with him. He did note that Henri Pirenne downplayed the significance of Orange's death in view of Parma's seemingly unstoppable military advance. (Note: 'The Belgian historian Henri Pirenne qualified the murder of Orange as a useless crime. After all, in his last years, the prince was unable to cope with the advance of Parma.') Van der Lem also pointed out that the term father of the fatherland didn't yet have its later nationalistic meaning in the 16th century, and that the Protestant-dominated Dutch Republic covering just the northern Netherlands (as it would achieve independence in 1648) would certainly not have been the 'fatherland' that Orange had envisioned, namely, a 17-province Netherlandish monarchy with a Valois dynasty and equality for Catholics and Protestants.

=== Jan van Nassau ===
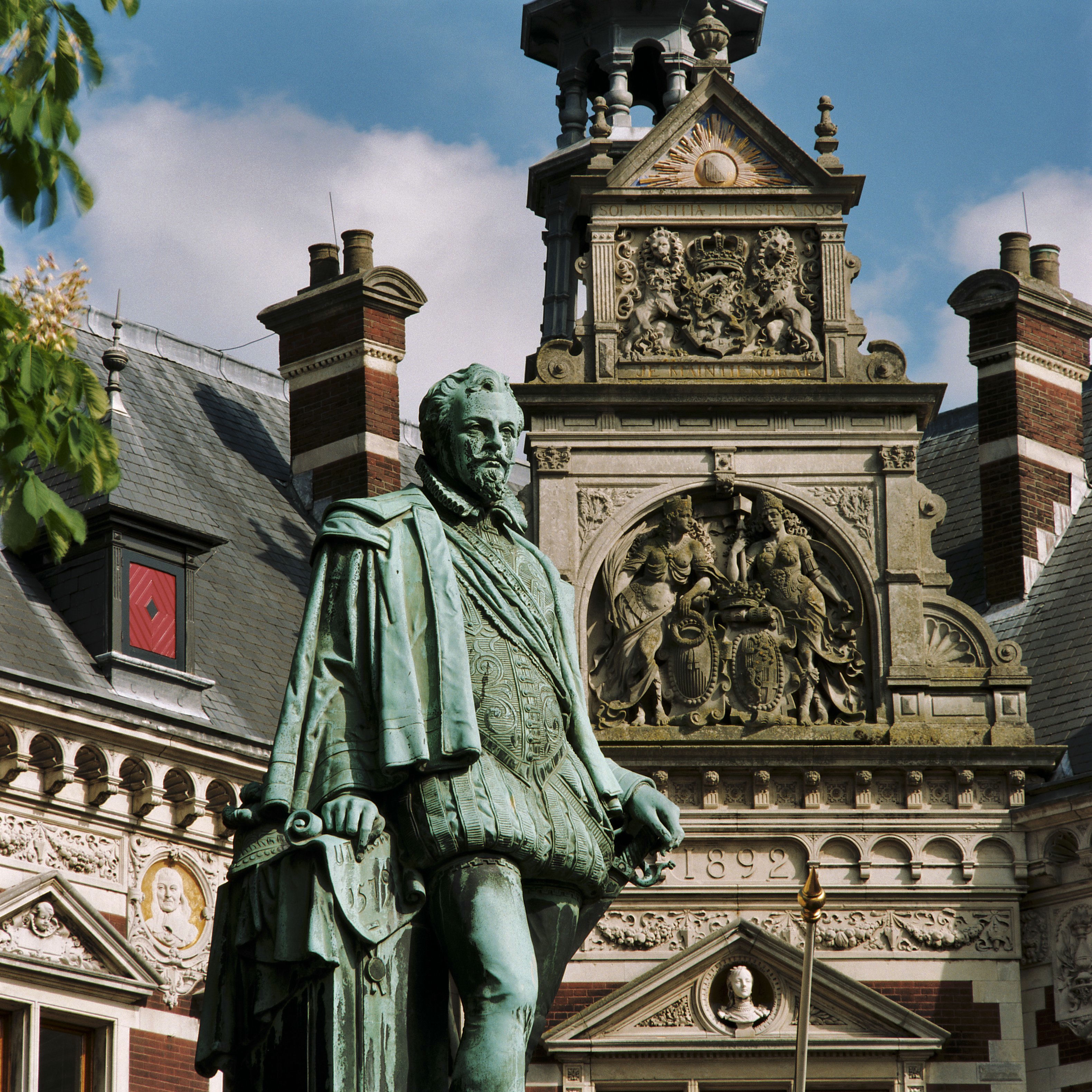
Statue of Jan van Nassau (Utrecht 1883).

Johann VI, Count of Nassau-Dillenburg, also simply known as Jan van Nassau, has long been hailed by nationalist historians as the driving force and 'great hero' behind the Union of Utrecht as he was the first to put his signature under the treaty on 23 January 1579. For this reason, king William III of the Netherlands, a direct descendant of Jan van Nassau, had a statue of him erected on the Dom Square next to the Dom Tower of Utrecht in 1883, but modern historians have challenged this notion. According to Kosterman (1999), Jan van Nassau more or less suddenly appeared in 1577, 'leaving behind [his] family, house and possessions due to great financial stress, coming down from Dillenburg to the Netherlands looking for a well-paying job. After some princely manipulation [by his brother William of Orange], he was appointed stadtholder of Guelders on 22 May 1578.' Nassau's aims differed from his brother Orange: he sought to establish a union of Calvinist provinces in the Netherlands for the benefit of his fellow job-seeking Protestant German noblemen, but his own Catholic-dominated province of Guelders was mostly opposed to such an alliance. Despite staging a coup d'état to get his way on 7 September 1578 and appointing a lot of confidants on key positions, Nassau was unable to sway the majority of the States of Guelders, and he temporarily returned to Germany; it was then the representatives of Holland and Zeeland who completed the preparations for the Union of Utrecht, which failed to obtain majority consent in Guelders.

=== Alexander Farnese, Duke of Parma ===
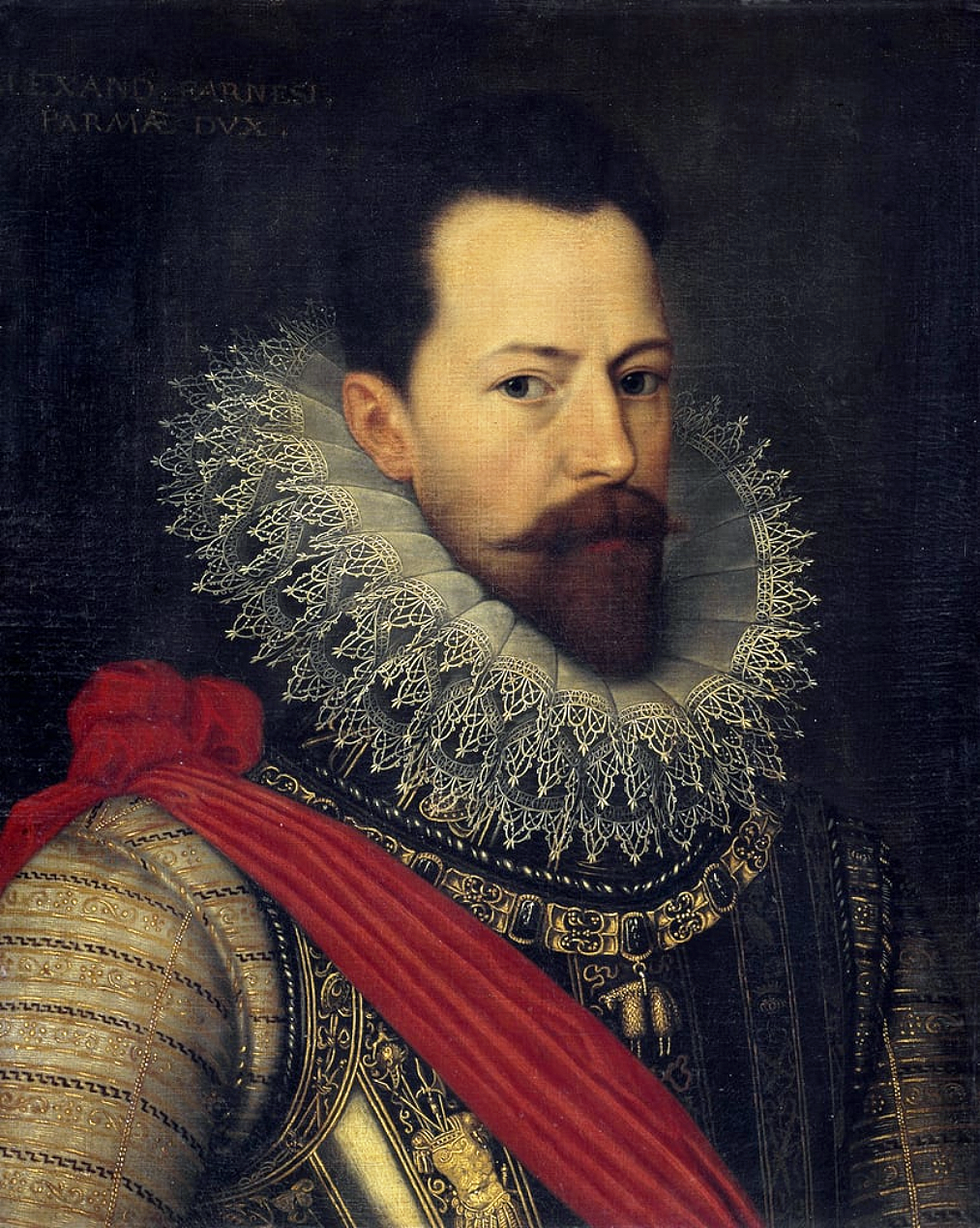
Alexander Farnese, Duke of Parma

Historians, including Dutch ones, are in broad agreement that Alexander Farnese, Duke of Parma was an unmatched diplomatic and military genius. Mulder et al. (2008) called him 'a smart diplomat and a talented general.' Likewise, Groenveld (2009) referred to Farnese's 'capable military and diplomatic performance'. Winkler Prins (2002) stated: "Farnese, who was not just an outstanding general, but also a great diplomat, not only accomplished the reconquest, but also the reconciliation of the Southern Netherlands." Belgian historian Henri Pirenne (1911) went as far as to say that the assassination of Orange in 1584 was a meaningless crime, because he had already been powerless to mount a proper defence against Parma's seemingly unstoppable advances for years. Fruin (1857), seconded by Van der Lem (2019), emphasised that the Dutch breakthroughs during the Ten Years (1588–1598) would have been impossible without the bulk of the Spanish army under Parma being tied up in France. Van der Lem (2019) concurred with Fruin that the Ten Years were militarily 'crucial', although it had more to do with the absence of Parma than the brilliance of the Republic's war efforts and economics. Only Winkler Prins (2002) alleged that Maurice of Orange 'mastered the new mathematics-based art of war equal to [Farnese]', although Maurice wasn't very politically gifted.

=== Maurice of Orange and Johan van Oldenbarnevelt ===
The relationship between stadtholder and unofficial captain-general Maurice, Prince of Orange (until 1618 known as Maurice of Nassau) and Land's Advocate of Holland Johan van Oldenbarnevelt, who was executed on 13 May 1619 at the instigation of Maurice, has been the subject of many Dutch historians' disputes. The interest of scholars focuses not just on the characters and actions of the two men, but also on what they were (later) said to represent: the earliest forms of the Orangist militarist stadtholderate that would eventually evolve into the Orange dynasty / Dutch monarchy of 1813 that still exists today, versus the staatse regenten / merchant / proto-capitalist class, later evolving into the republican Loevestein faction, some of which still later evolved into the Enlightened democratic-republican Patriotten of the 1780s. While early modern writers usually had a distinct preference of either Maurice or Oldenbarnevelt (for example, Joost van den Vondel vehemently criticised Maurice and admired Oldenbarnevelt in his poems), placing them at the beginning of both political traditions, modern historians have argued that these binary representations are oversimplifications of reality. Many have pointed out that Oldenbarnevelt and Maurice cooperated fairly well during the Ten Years, were in fact dependent on each other to accomplish their goals, and balanced each other out. Still, there is a consensus that Maurice committed a coup d'état in August 1618, and the Trial of Oldenbarnevelt, Grotius and Hogerbeets was unfair and politically motivated.

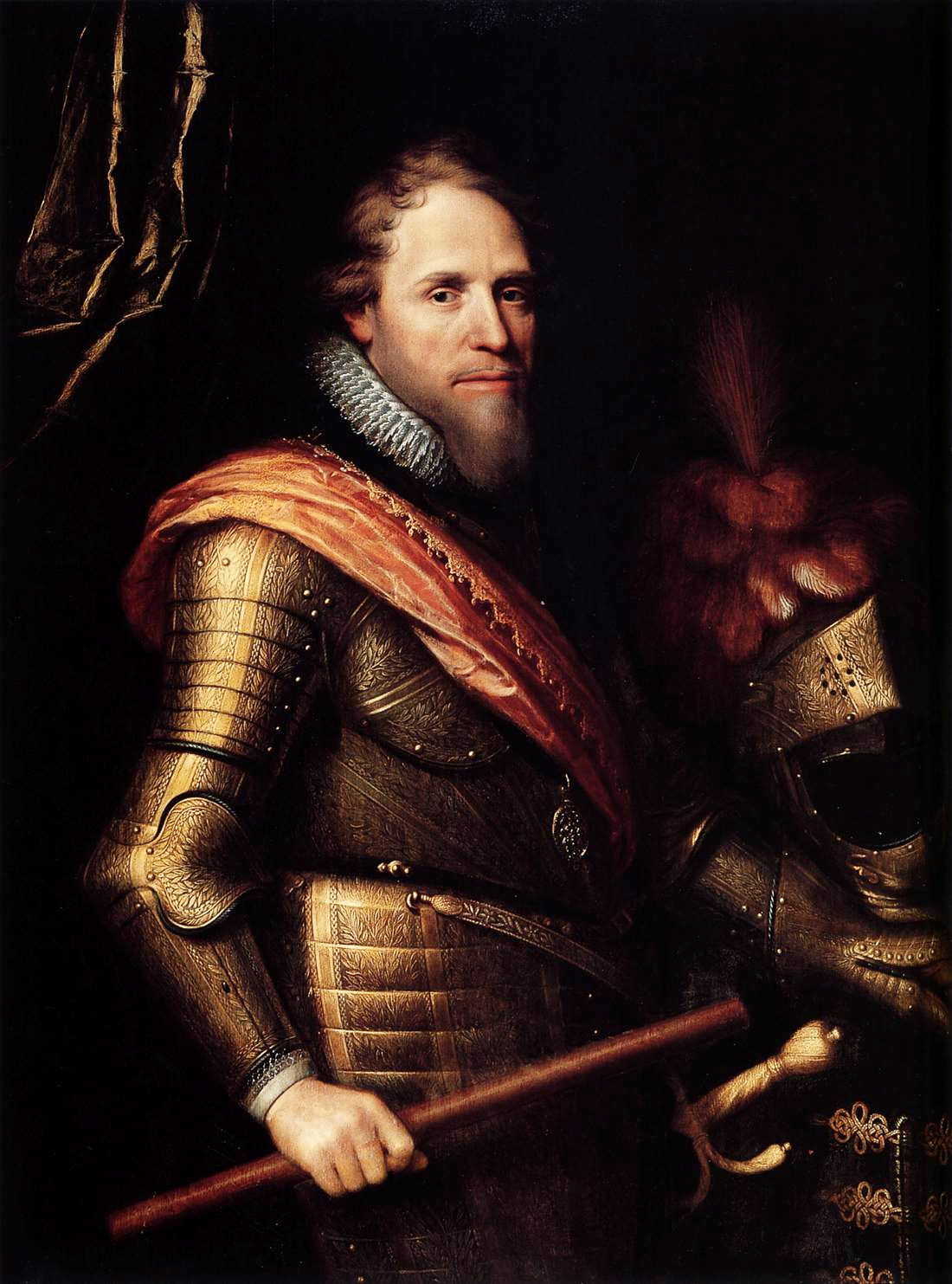
Maurice portrayed by Mierevelt, 1607

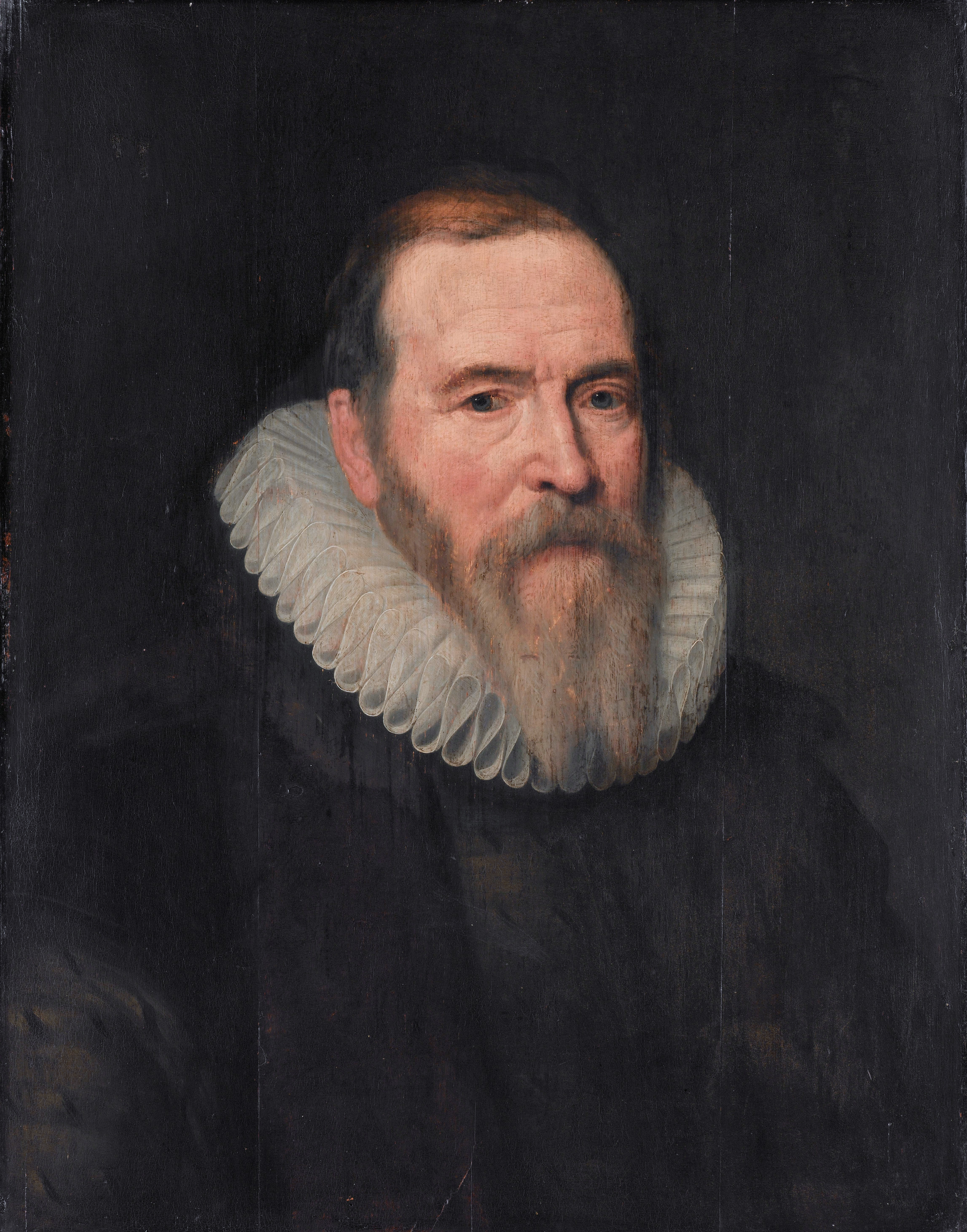
Oldenbarnevelt portrayed by Mierevelt, c. 1616

According to Winkler Prins (2002), 'Oldenbarnevelt is generally recognised as a first-rate intellect, a sharp jurist, the constitutional builder of the Republic of United Netherlands and the founder of its position in the world.' He worked 'with [Orange] to prevent geuzen dictatorship in favour of the regenten families' in 1573–1576. It credited his contacts with exiled Southerners and economic policy as Rotterdam pensionary (1576–1586) for the flourising of the Port of Rotterdam for decades thereafter, but 'as a tolerant humanist, [Oldenbarnevelt] only partially succeeded in securing the principle of religious peace' during the Union of Utrecht preparations. Winkler Prins judged his decision to have Maurice appointed as stadtholder of Holland and Zeeland ('but with restrictions establishing the sovereignty of the States'), and thereby 'the 'national' counterpart of the English governor-general [Leicester]', to be a 'masterpiece'. Simultaneously, however, this created the core of the 'increasing animosity between Oldenbarnevelt and Maurice', as the former (backed by the States of Holland) continuously rejected the idea of granting sovereignty to a 'hereditary chief', while especially Zeeland was in favour of recognising Maurice as count. On the other hand, Winkler Prins stated that Oldenbarnevelt 'managed, based on no legal document whatsoever, to raise the position of his own office to be the most important officials in the entire Republic'. It admired his diplomatic skill of attracting allies, forcing the Twelve Years' Truce and withstanding the pressure of the dynastic interests of Orange and Bourbon upon the republican government. His decision to have the States of Holland adopt the Sharp Resolution of August 1617 to allow cities to hire their own security forces was 'the only important defeat Oldenbarnevelt suffered', and the one which cost him both his office and his life; Maurice used his military force to stage a coup by disbanding the city mercenaries, arresting all political opposition, and appointing his own special court to have Oldenbarnevelt tried and executed. Although he had few friends in life due to being 'tyrannical', his 'dishonourable end motivated his allies such as the poet Joost van den Vondel to turn him into a martyr.'

Winkler Prins stated that Maurice 'mastered the new, mathematics-based art of war equal to [Farnese], and after Farnese's death, he was the unmatched greatest military leader of his time.' On the other hand, Maurice wasn't as political shrewd, being 'overshadowed by Oldenbarnevelt', and only 'managing to escape' the monarchal influence of Henry IV of France 'after long hesitation'. The fact that Oldenbarnevelt secured the Twelve Years' Truce (undermining Maurice's military position) and opposed one-person sovereignty (obstructing Maurice's dynastic aspirations) is what caused their rift, while the religious conflicts between them 'barely played a role, because the confessional colours of both has always remained vague.' According to Arie van Deursen's 2000 biography of Maurice, he "failed as the winner of the conflict" the moment Oldenbarnevelt's head rolled: "If there was a court of history, it would unambigiously pronounce a guilty verdict over Maurice".

== Bibliography ==
- Babel, Rainer (2021). "42. Der Frieden von Cateau-Cambrésis 1559". Handbuch Frieden im Europa der Frühen Neuzeit / Handbook of Peace in Early Modern Europe. pp. 857–876. doi:10.1515/9783110591316-042. ISBN 9783110591316. S2CID 234558650. doi:10.1515/9783110591316-042
- Blok, Petrus Johannes (1924). Geschiedenis van het Nederlandsche volk. Deel 2. Leiden: A.W. Sijthoff. p. 710. (3rd edition; original published in 1896)
- Cruz, Laura (2007). "The 80 Years' Question: The Dutch Revolt in Historical Perspective". History Compass. 5 (3). Blackwell Publishing: 914–934. doi:10.1111/j.1478-0542.2007.00400.x.
- Duke, A. (1997). "A legend in the making: News of the 'Spanish Inquisition' in the Low Countries in German evangelical pamphlets, 1546–1550". Nederlands Archief voor Kerkgeschiedenis/Dutch Review of Church History. 77 (2): 125–144. doi:10.1163/002820397X00225. JSTOR 24011467.
- Frederiks, Jaap (1999). "Placcaet van Verlatinghe". In Willem Velema (ed.). Het aanzien van een millennium. Kroniek van historische gebeurtenissen van de Lage Landen 1000–2000. Utrecht: Uitgeverij Het Spectrum. pp. 67–69. ISBN 9027468443.
- Fruin, Robert Jacobus (1899). Tien jaren uit den Tachtigjarigen Oorlog. 1588–1598. The Hague: Martinus Nijhoff. p. 386. (5th edition; original published in 1857)
- Groenveld, Simon (2009). Unie – Bestand – Vrede. Drie fundamentele wetten van de Republiek der Verenigde Nederlanden. Hilversum: Uitgeverij Verloren. p. 200. ISBN 9789087041274. (in cooperation with H.L.Ph. Leeuwenberg and H.B. van der Weel)
- Groenveld, Simon; Leeuwenberg, Huib (2020). De Tachtigjarige Oorlog. Opstand en consolidatie in de Nederlanden (ca. 1560–1650). Derde editie (in Dutch). Zutphen: Walburg Pers. p. 750. ISBN 9789462495661. (e-book; original publication 2008; in cooperation with M. Mout and W. Zappey)
- Haan, Bertrand (2010). Une paix pour l'éternité. La négociation du traité du Cateau-Cambrésis (in French). Casa de Velázquez. ISBN 978-8490961308.
- Israel, Jonathan Irvine (1995). The Dutch Republic: Its Rise, Greatness, and Fall, 1477-1806. Clarendon Press. ISBN 978-0-19-873072-9.
- Klink, Hubrecht (1997). Opstand, politiek en religie bij Willem van Oranje. Een thematische biografie. Heerenveen: J.J. Groen en Zoon. p. 392. ISBN 9050308708.
- Kosterman, Hans (1999). "Alva en de tiende penning; De Unie van Utrecht; De Armada; De terechtstelling van Johan van Oldenbarnevelt". In Willem Velema (ed.). Het aanzien van een millennium. Kroniek van historische gebeurtenissen van de Lage Landen 1000–2000. Utrecht: Uitgeverij Het Spectrum. pp. 49–51, 61–63, 76–78, 91–93. ISBN 9027468443.
- van der Lem, Anton (1995). De Opstand in de Nederlanden (1555–1648) (in Dutch). Uitgeverij Kosmos / Leiden University. Archived from the original on 8 August 2022.
- van der Lem, Anton (2019). Revolt in the Netherlands: The Eighty Years War, 1568–1648. London: Reaktion Books. pp. 142–243. ISBN 9781789140880.
- Mallett, Michael; Shaw, Christine (2014). The Italian Wars 1494–1559: War, State and Society in Early Modern Europe. Pearson Education. ISBN 978-0582057586.
- Mulder, Liek; Doedens, Anne; Kortlever, Yolande (2008). Geschiedenis van Nederland, van prehistorie tot heden. Baarn: HBuitgevers. p. 288. ISBN 9789055746262.
- Nuyens, W. J. F. (1869). "De Geschiedenis van de Nederlandsche Beroerten der XVIe Eeuw, uit een Katholiek oogpunt beschouwd. Andwoord aan Prof. R. Fruin, Prof. J. Van Vloten en Dr M. Van Deventer, door Dr W.J.F. Nuyens". Dietsche Warande. 8: 237–288.
- Parker, Geoffrey (2002). Empire, War and Faith in Early Modern Europe. Allen Lane. ISBN 978-0-7139-9515-2.
- Rooze-Stouthamer, Clasina Martina (2009). De opmaat tot de Opstand: Zeeland en het centraal gezag (1566–1572) (in Dutch). Uitgeverij Verloren. ISBN 9789087040918.
- van Stipriaan, René (2021). De zwijger. Het leven van Willem van Oranje. Amsterdam: Querido Facto. p. 944. ISBN 9789021402758.
- Tracy, J.D. (2008). The Founding of the Dutch Republic: War, Finance, and Politics in Holland 1572–1588. Oxford University Press. ISBN 978-0-19-920911-8.
- Visconti, Joseph (2003). The Waldensian Way to God. Xulon Press. pp. 299–300. ISBN 978-1591607922.
- Van der Wee, Herman (1969). "De economie als factor bij het begin van de opstand in de Zuidelijke Nederlanden door Herman van der Wee". BMGN: Low Countries Historical Review. 83. Royal Netherlands Historical Society: 15–32.
- Williams, Megan (2011). "Review of: Bertrand Haan, Une paix pour l'éternité: La négociation du traité du Cateau-Cambrésis" (PDF). Renaissance Quarterly. 64 (2). The Renaissance Society of America: 626–628. doi:10.1086/661851. S2CID 164326263.
- van der Zeijden, Albert (2012). Katholieke identiteit en historisch bewustzijn: W.J.F. Nuyens (1823–1894) en zijn 'nationale' geschiedschrijving. Hilversum: Uitgeverij Verloren. p. 386. ISBN 9789065507099.
