= Fruin =

Fruin is a surname. Notable people with the surname include:

- John J. Fruin, American civil engineer
- Noah Wardrip-Fruin, American media theorist
- Robert Fruin (1823–1899), Dutch historian
- Shelley Fruin (born 1961), New Zealand cricketer
- Tom Fruin (born 1974), American sculptor
