= Nuyens =

Nuyens is a surname. Notable people with the surname include:

- Nick Nuyens (born 1980), Belgian cyclist
- Wilhelmus Nuyens (1823-1894), Dutch historian

== See also ==
- Wijnand Nuijen (1813-1839), Dutch painter and printmaker
- Martijn Nuijens (born 1983), Dutch track and field athlete
- France Nuyen (born 1939), French-American actress, model, and psychological counselor
- Nguyen, a Vietnamese surname
