= Famiano Strada =

Italian Jesuit and historian

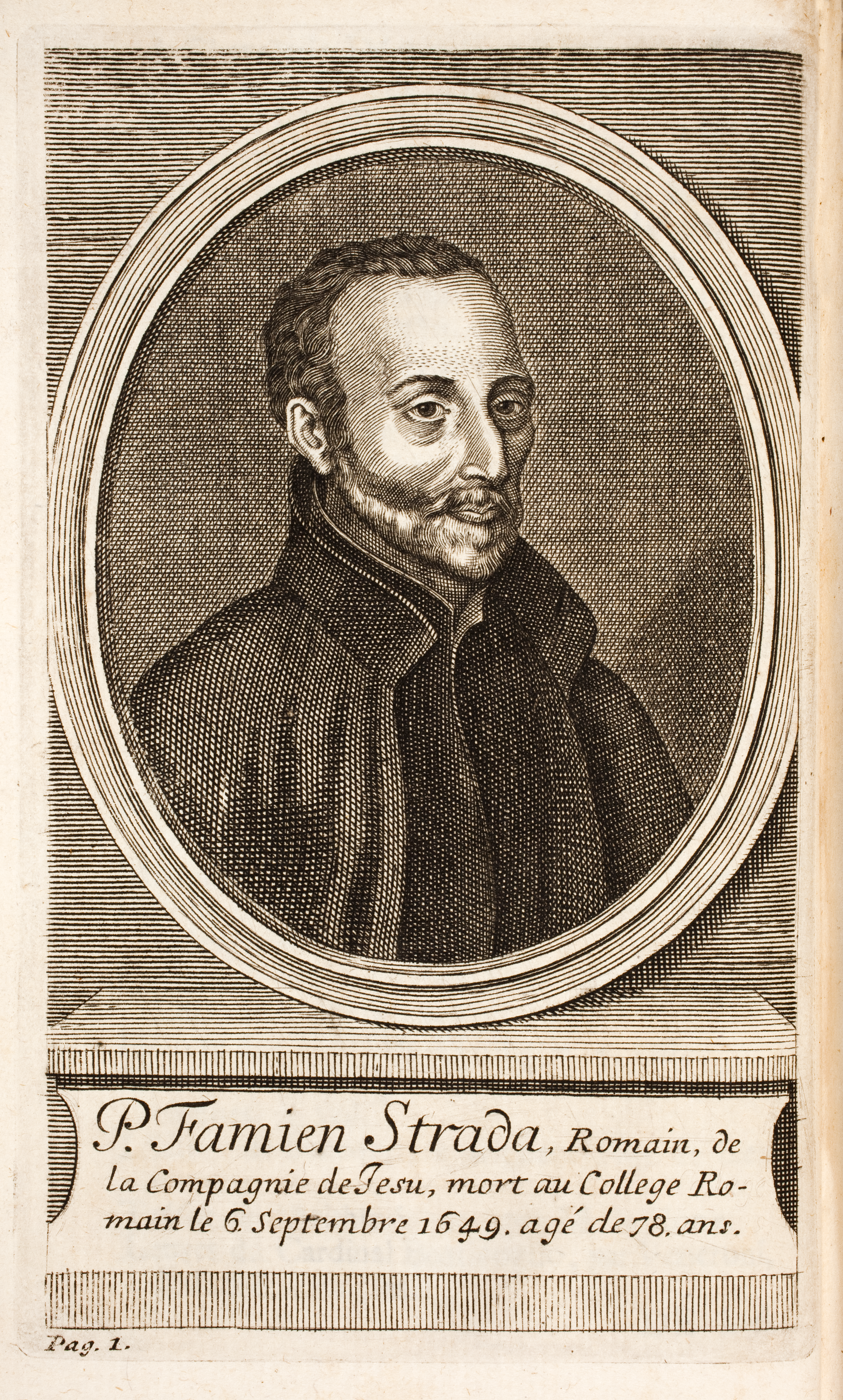
- Portrait of Famiano Strada
- Born: 1572; Rome, Papal States
- Died: 6 September 1649 (aged 76–77); Rome, Papal States
- Occupations: Jesuit, latinist, and historian
- Employer: Pontifical Gregorian University
- Known for: Prolusiones academicæ De bello Belgico

Famiano Strada (1572 – 6 September 1649) was an Italian Jesuit and historian of wars in the low countries (Belgium and Netherlands) during the early part of the Eighty Years' War, starting with the abdication of Charles V in 1556 to the capture of Rheinsberg in 30 January 1590.

== Biography ==
Famiano Strada was born in Rome in 1572, and entered the Jesuit order as a young man. He taught rhetoric in the Roman College in the first part of the seventeenth century. In 1617, at the demand of Ranuccio I Farnese, Duke of Parma, he was assigned the task of writing a history of the war in the Netherlands. In order to write this history, Strada was given access to the (now destroyed) private archives of the House of Farnese. He consulted a broad range of sources such as letters written by princes, instructions to ambassadors, notes by spies and so forth. Throughout his history he reminded his readers of this access to ‘state secrets’ by citing and copying reports and letters. Strada’s history was divided in two ‘decades’: the first decade described the period from 1559 to 1579 and the second decade from 1579 to 1589. A third volume is said to have been prevented from publication by Spanish authorities. The first decade of the De bello belgico was translated into English by Sir Robert Stapylton, with the title The History of the Low-Countrey Warres (London, 1650). There were many editions of the original Latin, and continuations were prepared by G. Dondini and A. Gallucci; Italian translation by C. Papini and P. Segneri (Rome, 1638–49, 2 v.), French by Du Royer (Paris, 1664, 1669), Spanish by Melchior de Novar (Cologne, 1682, 3 v.).

Famiano Strada wrote also Prolusiones et Paradeigmata Eloquentiae, literary commentaries on the classics of ancient literature. The Prolusiones were issued in Oxford by William Turner in 1631. The work served as a source for many English Renaissance poets (Martin, “Commentary,” Crashaw, Poems, pp. 439-440), and for Coleridge in Biographia Literaria (London, 1960), p. 32, who described Strada as a leading authority on poetic diction; in 1762 (London), Prolusiones was published with a collection of epigrams for the use of scholars at Eton.

Strada was violently attacked by Cardinal Guido Bentivoglio in his Memorie (Amsterdam and Venice, 1648; last ed. by Costantino Panigada, Bari, 1934); and by Caspar Schoppe in his Infamia Famiani (1663). Strada was defended by Protestant scholars of Northern Germany, such as the brothers Andreas and Olaf Borrichius.

== Works ==
- Strada, Famiano (1617). Prolusiones academicæ (in Latin). Romae: Apud Iacobum Mascardum.
- Strada, Famiano (1627). Famiani Stradæ Romani e Societate Iesu Prolusiones academicæ (in Latin) (seconda edizione riveduta dall'autore ed.). Lugduni: sumpt. Iacobi Cardon & Petri Cauellat.
- Strada, Famiano (1632). Famiani Stradæ Romani e Societate Iesu De bello Belgico decas prima (in Latin). Romae.
- Strada, Famiano (1647). Famiani Stradæ Romani e Societate Iesu De bello Belgico decas secunda (in Latin). Romae.
- Orationes tres de passione Domini, Romae, 1641.
- Strada, Famiano (1654). R.P. Famiani Stradæ Romani e Societate Jesu Eloquentia bipartita (in Latin). Goudae: Typis Guilielmi vander Hoeve.
