= Wilhelmus Nuyens =

Dutch historian (1823–1894)

Willem Jan Frans Nuyens
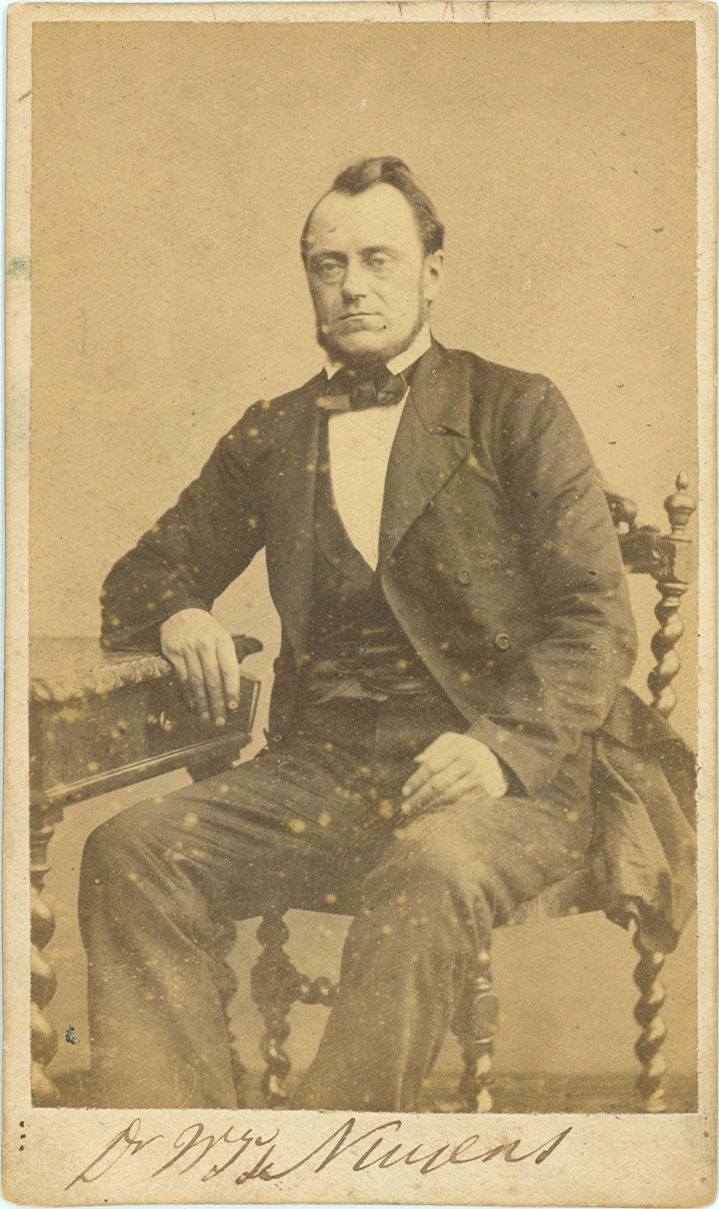
- Nuyens around 1870
- Born: Wilhelmus Johannes Franciscus Nuyens; 18 August 1823; Avenhorn, North Holland
- Died: 8 December 1894 (aged 71); Westwoud, North Holland
- Education: Medicine
- Alma mater: Utrecht University
- Known for: Historiography of the Eighty Years' War

Wilhelmus Johannes Franciscus Nuyens, better known as Willem Jan Frans Nuyens, (18 August 1823 – 10 December 1894) was a Dutch historian.

== Biography ==
Having completed his Humanistic studies in Enkhuizen, he studied medicine at Utrecht, 1842, received the degree of M.D. in 1848, and began practicing in Westwoud near the city of Hoorn. He devoted some of his spare time to literature and history.

He was an energetic defender of the rights and the privileges of Catholics, and one of the first to champion the freedom of the Catholic Church in the Netherlands. Catholics erected a monument to him in the church at Westwoud and set aside the surplus of the money contributed as a perpetual fund, called "Nuyensfund", to aid the work of Catholic historians of the Netherlands.

== Works ==
He published, in 1856, a volume of poems entitled: De laatste Dochter der Hohenstaufen, on subjects chiefly from the Middle Ages. Then came a series of historical works, first among which was Het Katholicismus in betrekking met de beschaving van Europa (Amsterdam, 1856–1857, in 2 volumes), a history of the influence of Catholicism upon the culture and civilization of European nations. In several pamphlets and in a voluminous work, Geschiedenis der Regering van Pius IX (Amsterdam, 1862–63), he treated the Roman question of 1859.

His chief work, Geschiedenis der nederlandsche Beroerten in de XVI. eeuw (Amsterdam, 1865–70, in 8 parts), a history of the revolutionary wars of the Netherlands from 1559 to 1598, discloses no new sources, but shows what rights Catholics were entitled to in the State. New editions appeared in 1886 and 1904. Somewhat as a sequel he wrote: Geschiedenis der kerkelijke en politieke geschillen in de republiek der zeven vereenigde provincien (1598–1625) (Amsterdam, 1886-87 in two parts).

Intended for popular reading are:

- Algemeen Geschiedenis des nederlandschen Volks- van de vroegste tijden tot op onze dagen (Amsterdam, 1871–82, in 20 parts; new edition, 1896–98, in 24 parts)
- Geschiedenis van het nederlandsche Volk van 1815 tot op onze dagen (Amsterdam, 1883–86, in 4 parts; 2nd edition 1898)
- Vaderlandsche Geschiedenis voor de jeugd (Amsterdam, 1870; 25th edition, 1905, by G. F. I. Douwes)

He published a number of pamphlets and articles in periodicals on topics of the times, especially in Onze Wachter, edited by him from 1871 to 1874 in collaboration with Herman Schaepmann.
