= John J. Fruin =

US-American engineer, urban planner, and author

John J. Fruin was an engineer, urban planner, and author known for his work in the field of crowd science. In 1983, he received the American Society of Civil Engineers Transportation Engineering Award.

== Early life and education ==
Fruin was born on May 22, 1928 in Brooklyn, New York to Mr. and Mrs. John Fruin. In 1951, he received a B.C.E degree from Manhattan College. He attended Polytechnic Institute of Brooklyn, where he received his M.C.E, M.S., and PhD degrees.

== Career ==
He evaluated personal comfort zones of individuals in different situations, which is affected by national culture, the degree to which people are intimate with one another, mental health, and other factors. He coined the terms "intimate distance", the narrowest zone; "touch zone"; "no touch zone"; and the widest zone, "personal comfort zone". Fruin was a consultant to the investigation into The Who concert disaster of 1979. He also was an adjunct professor at Polytechnic. Now retired, he was formerly employed as a research engineer by the Port Authority of New York and New Jersey.

For his research on pedestrian traffic, he received the American Society of Civil Engineers Transportation Engineering Award in 1983. He was a member of the Human Factors and Ergonomics Society, a Fellow of the Institute of Transportation Engineers, and a Fellow of the American Society of Civil Engineers.

== Personal life ==
Fruin married fellow Brooklyn resident, Rita Murray, in the spring of 1952. He has lived in Massapequa, New York.

He died on January 16, 2025 in Massapequa, New York.

== Publications ==
- John J. Fruin (1970). Designing for Pedestrians: A Level of Service Concept. Polytechnic University of Brooklyn.
- John J. Fruin (1971). Pedestrian planning and design. Metropolitan Association of Urban Designers and Environmental Planners.
- John J. Fruin (1972). Service and Capacity of People Mover Systems. American Society of Civil Engineers.
- John J. Fruin (1974). Transportation Facilities Workshop--Passenger, Freight, and Parking. New York.
- John J. Fruin; Rolf F. Marshall; Port Authority of New York and New Jersey. Engineering Dept; United States. Urban Mass Transportation Administration. Technical Assistance Program (1985). Accelerating Walkway Systems: Summary report. U.S. Department of Transportation, Urban Mass Transportation Administration.
- John J. Fruin (1985). Passenger Information Systems for Transit Transfer Facilities.
- John J. Fruin (1985). Pedestrian Falling Accidents in Transit Terminals. U.S. Department of Transportation, Urban Mass Transportation Administration.
- John J. Fruin (1988). A Validation of the Time-space Corner and Crosswalk Analysis. Transportation Research Board.
