= Petrus Johannes Blok =

Dutch historian

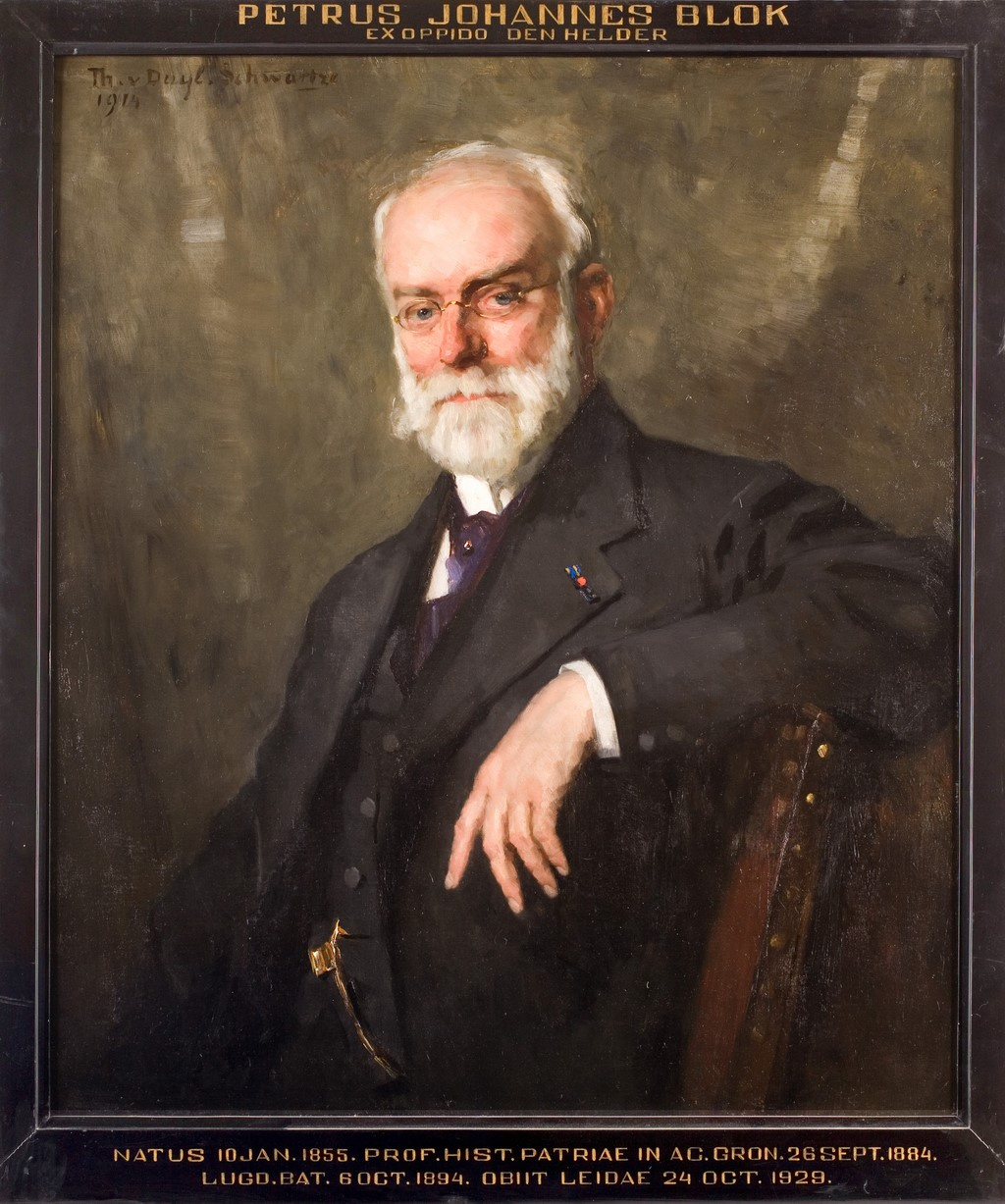
Petrus Johannes Blok Painting by Thérèse Schwartze

Petrus Johannes Blok (10 January 1855, in Den Helder – 24 October 1929, in Leiden) was a Dutch historian.

== Biography ==
Born in Den Helder, Blok studied at the Latin School of Alkmaar and read classics at Leiden University, receiving his doctorate for a study of Sextus Pompeius. After this, he got a position at the Leiden Latin School, and published two books on the city's Medieval and Burgundian history.

In 1884, he was made professor of Dutch History at the University of Groningen, where he supervised the publication of a series of historical documents from the provinces of Groningen and Drenthe. He was in the habit of traveling long distances to search for written documents, which brought him as far as Rome. Among his students was Pieter Jelles Troelstra.

In 1892, Blok was elected a member of the Royal Netherlands Academy of Arts and Sciences. In 1894, he succeeded Robert Fruin as professor of Dutch History in Leiden.

== Ideas ==
Blok believed that it was the task of a historian to stress a country's national past and contribute to a sense of unity. It does not come as a surprise that he was one of the editors of the Nieuw Nederlandsch Biografisch Woordenboek ("New Dutch Biographical Dictionary"). His books are biographical in nature and are about Dutch heroes: Oranje (1919–1920), Frederik Hendrik (1924), and De Ruyter (1928).

His work, the Geschiedenis van het Nederlandsche volk, consists of eight volumes, published between 1892 and 1907. It is really a history of a nation – with its arts, economy, religions, laws, and daily life – and not the story of a state. It is a book about people, but not a real social history; Blok's magnum opus has unfavorably been compared to Pirenne's famous Histoire de Belgique (1909–1932). (The English translation, by Ruth Putnam and Oscar A. Bierstadt, of Blok's book, History of the people of the Netherlands, is abridged and has five volumes.)

== Legacy ==
His ideas about history as an instrument of nation building have for a long time been out of fashion among academicians, but returned very much to the center of the Dutch public debate in 2006, when politician Jan Marijnissen argued for the creation of a Museum of National History. His proposal was accepted in 2008, but ultimately the museum didn't materialize.

Blok is the spiritual father of the Dutch Institute in the Villa Borghese gardens, which he founded in 1904.
