= Robert Fruin =

Dutch historian

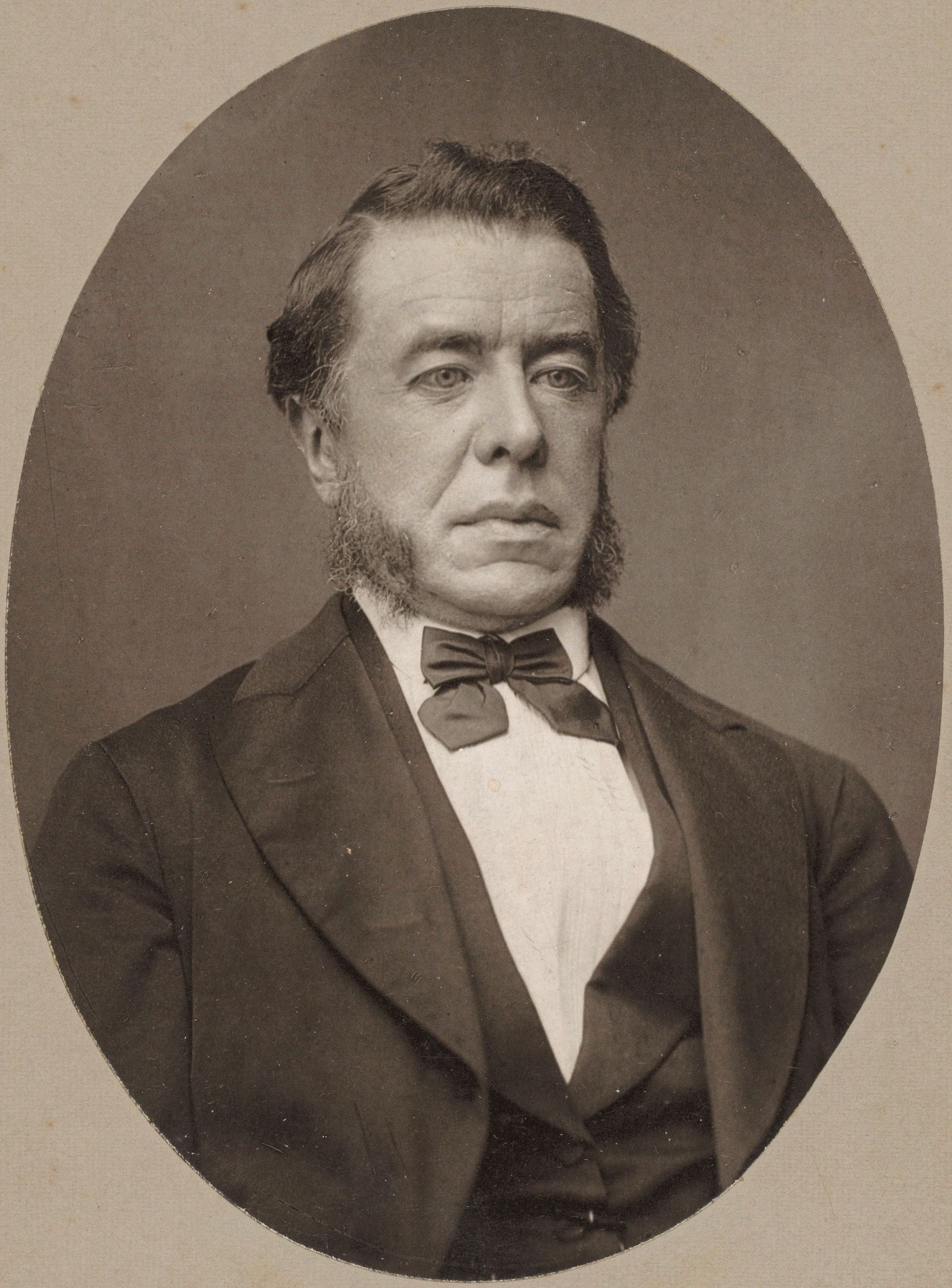
Robert Fruin

Robert Jacobus Fruin (11 November 1823 in Rotterdam – 29 January 1899 in Leiden) was a Dutch historian. A follower of Leopold von Ranke, he introduced the scientific study of history in the Netherlands when he was professor of Dutch national history (Dutch: Vaderlandsche Geschiedenis) at Leiden University.

== Biography ==
Fruin, a lifelong bachelor, studied classical philology at Leiden University from 1842, and received his Ph.D. on 18 December 1847 with a dissertation on Manetho, entitled De Manethone Sebennytha. As he was a man of independent means, he spent the next two years in independent studies and political pursuits in Utrecht, before he accepted a position as praeceptor (teacher) in history at Leiden Gymnasium in 1850.

These were tumultuous times in Dutch constitutional history as the liberal 1848 Dutch constitutional reform by Johan Rudolf Thorbecke had just been completed, and was the subject of heated political debate. In this debate Fruin took the liberal side and he conducted a learned polemic with a fellow eminent Dutch historian, who was also a leader of the Conservative opposition to the new political ideas, Guillaume Groen van Prinsterer. Though the polemic was courteous, it would inaugurate a certain coolness in the professional and personal relationships between the two men, that would last during their careers.

They would cross swords in their professional fields also. Groen van Prinsterer had a style of historiography that was more poetic than Fruin thought appropriate. He shared that style with the American historian John Lothrop Motley who would use his archival work on William the Silent in his own work on the Dutch Republic: The Rise of the Dutch Republic, which caused a furore in the Netherlands. Though Fruin had much sympathy for Motley's work, he also was prompted by it to do his own original research on the events leading up to the Dutch Revolt, and on the crucial years of that Revolt, which led him to completely different conclusions. He published these in Het Voorspel van den Tachtigjarigen oorlog (Prologue to the Eighty Years' War) and Tien jaren uit den Tachtigjarigen oorlog (Ten years from the Eighty Years' War).

In a later review of Motley's History of the United Netherlands Fruin politely criticized Motley's tendency to take highly partisan points of view (however flattering those might be to Dutch national heroes) and his regrettable habit of introducing events that made "good stories" but never actually happened.

In his inaugural oration (held on 1 July 1860) after his appointment as the first professor of Dutch national history at Leiden University on 20 February 1860 (which was preceded by his promotion to prorector of his gymnasium in 1859), which was entitled Onpartijdigheid van den geschiedschrijver (Impartiality of the historian), Fruin defended the point of view that historians needed to be impartial in their historiography. He did not deny that pure objectivity was an unattainable ideal, and he himself was known for his partisan standpoints, but he thought that historians should take the point of view of their subjects into account, even if they vehemently disagreed with that point of view, and try to represent it in a fair way.

As such he showed himself to be an adept of Leopold von Ranke, whom he highly esteemed. He helped introduce Ranke's ideas about historiography in the Netherlands and to spread his influence on Dutch historiography in the second half of the 19th century, giving the Dutch profession of historiography a more "scientific" flavor.

Fruin was not a very inspiring lecturer. His lectures were better known for their thoroughness and quality, than for their oratory. Nevertheless, he was popular as a professor. The same thoroughness that characterized his lectures, also characterized his historical research. He was averse to writing large historical handbooks, preferring the elegant little monograph, of which he published many in the literary magazine De Gids, and in the specialized historical journal Nijhoff's Bijdragen. He specialized in certain historical periods and subjects, like the early years of the Dutch Republic and the stadtholderate of stadtholder William III. He limited his academic subject, Vaderlandsche Geschiedenis to the history of the Dutch Republic, ending in 1795, as he thought more recent history (which, after all, was only half a century old in his time) as yet too unsettled to be properly handled.

Beside his interpretive historical work, he also published two important compilations of sources:

- the Informacie van 1514 (a compilation of economic statistical material the Burgundian authorities in the province of Holland undertook in 1514 as a preliminary to a tax reform), and a similar survey from the 1490s;
- Annalen van Dusseldorp (a heavily edited ancient chronicle).

His defense of impartiality in historiography as a matter of principle did not prevent him from taking a stand occasionally, if he felt truth and fairness made it necessary. His polemics with Catholic revisionist historians of the time, about what he felt were their distortions of historical truth in their support of the struggle for Emancipation of the long-repressed Catholic minority in the Netherlands, are legendary. Though as a liberal he sympathized with their political objectives, he objected to what he saw as slanders of his historical heroes. To show that he could give Catholics their due he wrote his article De Gorcumsche martelaren (The martyrs of Gorkum) in 1865, about a famous atrocity perpetrated against Catholic priests by the Sea Beggars.

Another characterizing example is the altercation he had with general Willem Jan Knoop, a Dutch military historian, about the question whether stadtholder William III had known of the fact that the Treaty of Nijmegen had already been signed, when he fought the bloody Battle of Saint-Denis (1678). Fruin thought that William spoke the truth when he swore that he had not known. However, new material brought to light that he must have known, and this so shocked Fruin's faith in William that he everafter displayed a distinct coolness to this heretofore revered subject.

Fruin reluctantly retired from his professorship in 1894, when he reached the mandatory retirement age of 70. In his Afscheidsrede (Farewell Address) of June 1, 1894, he was able to point to the many advances Dutch historiography had made during his professional career. This was mainly thanks to him, but he was too modest to claim it was all his doing, or even that he had founded a "school". He died five years later after a short illness.

His successor was P.J. Blok.

== Sources ==
- (in Dutch) Branden, F. Jos. van den, and Frederiks, J.G. (1888–1891), "Fruin (Robert Jacobus)", in: Biographisch woordenboek der Noord- en Zuidnederlandsche letterkunde, p. 262
- (in Dutch) Muller, P.L. (April, 1900) "Levensbericht van Robert Fruin", in: Jaarboek van de Maatschappij der Nederlandse Letterkunde, 1900, pp. 11–62
