= Portrait of William the Silent =

Painting by Adriaen Thomasz

Portrait of William the Silent refers to a portrait painting on panel by the Flemish painter Adriaen Thomasz Key depicting William the Silent, the leader of the Dutch revolt at about 46 years of age.

== Versions ==
The work survives in three versions, which are now in the Mauritshuis (The Hague), the Rijksmuseum (Amsterdam) and the Museo Thyssen-Bornemisza (Madrid). Only the latter version is dated and was painted in 1579. All three are considered autograph and to go back to a now lost original.

There are some minor differences between the versions in some details. The Rijksmuseum and Museo Thyssen-Bornemisza versions are the closest to each other. The Mauritshuis version omits the shoulder and arm and shows a more severe facial expression. The version in the Mauritshuis was restored after the panel was damaged by a crack in the wood, which did not affect the face. The shoulder of the sitter has been reconstructed. The reconstruction was based on the other versions of the portrait.

== Description ==
The sitter is posed against a dark background against which the flesh tones of the face, the white ruff and the elegant grey and gold decoration of his clothes stand out. The face is rendered with much detail in line with the Northern portraiture of the period. At the time this portrait was painted, William the Silent was at the height of his career. This can also be seen in the portrait. He is not shown in armour, but in neat and opulent civilian clothes. In this portrait from Key's later period, the influence of Antonis Mor is shown in its increased interest in conveying the sitter's social status.

== The maker ==
Adriaen Thomasz. Key was a Flemish painter of portraits and religious paintings, a draughtsman and a printmaker. He worked for a while in the Antwerp workshop of the prominent history and portrait painter Willem Key and later took over the workshop.

The three versions

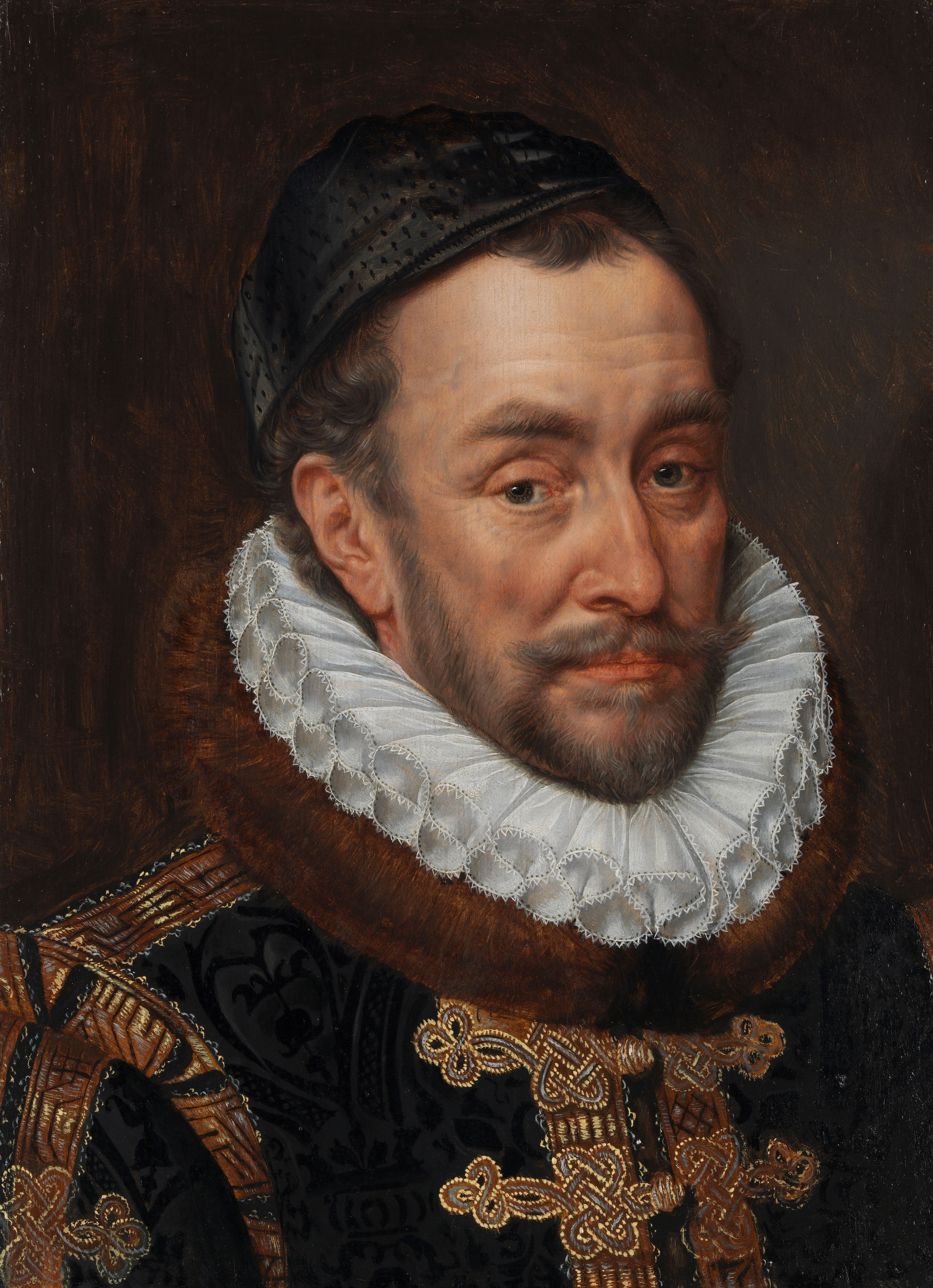
Rijksmuseum

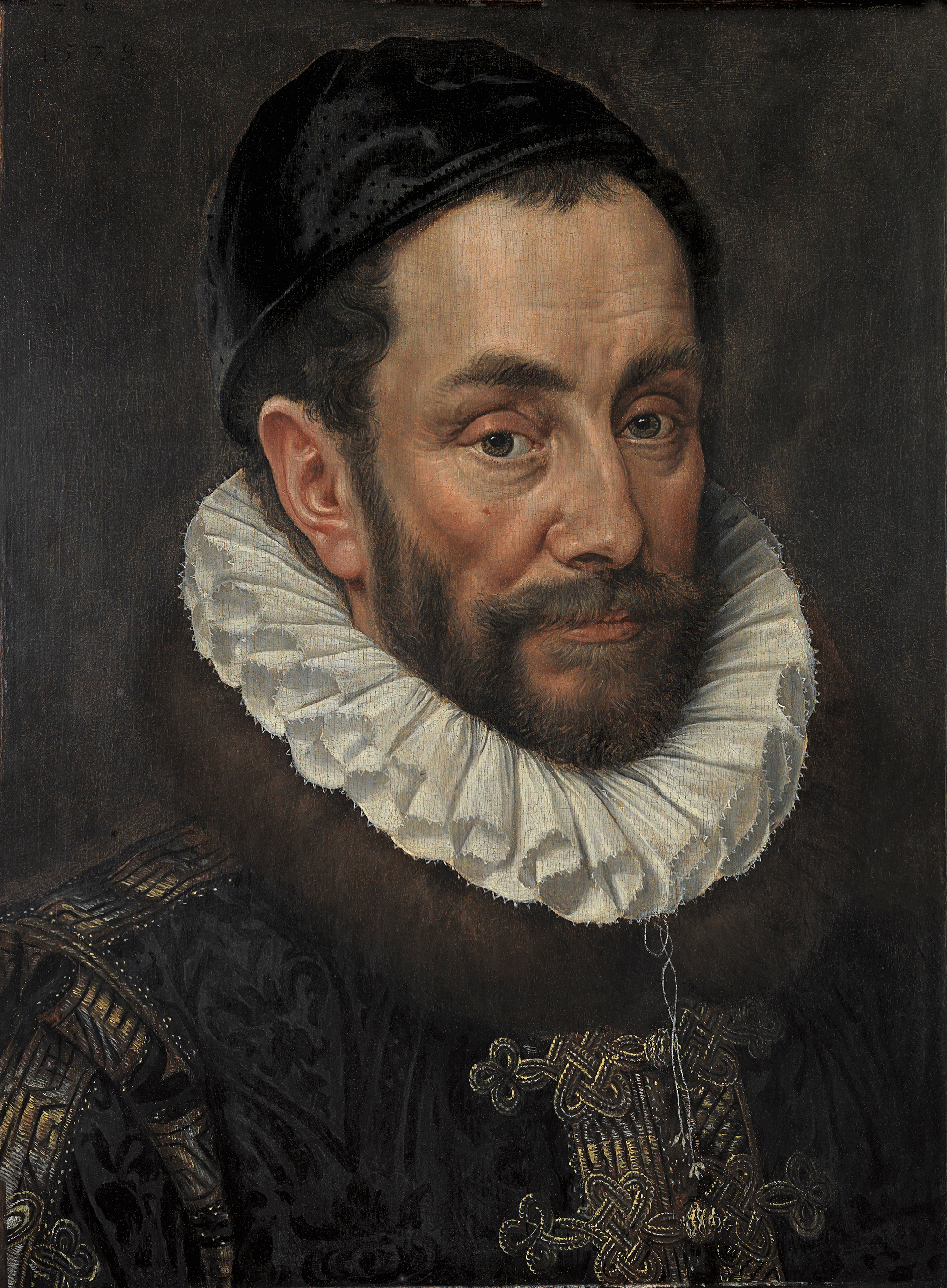
Museo Thyssen-Bornemisza

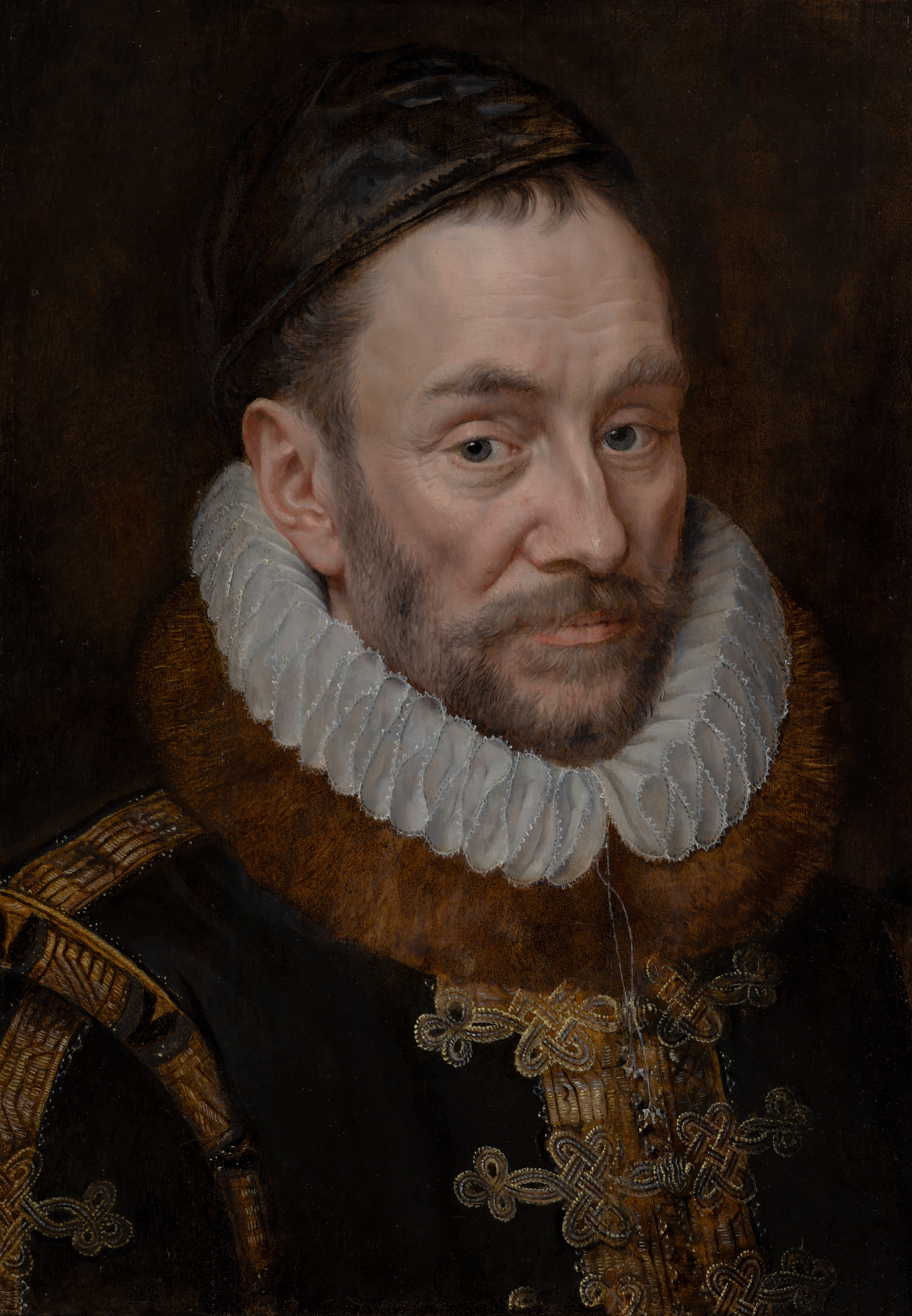
Mauritshuis
