= Adriaen Thomasz Key =

Flemish painter (c. 1545 – after 1589)

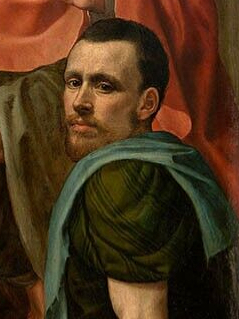
- Self-portrait; detail of The Last Supper, 1575
- Born: c. 1544; Antwerp
- Died: after 1589; Antwerp
- Movement: Dutch and Flemish Renaissance painting

Adriaen Thomasz. Key (c. 1544 in Antwerp – after 1589 in Antwerp) was a Flemish painter of portraits and religious paintings, a draughtsman and a printmaker. He worked for a while in the Antwerp workshop of the prominent history and portrait painter Willem Key and later took over the workshop. His work was highly regarded in his time for its technical mastery and innovative concepts and thus influenced a later generation of painters including Rubens.

== Life ==
Very little is known about the origins and early life of Adriaen Thomasz. Key. Research has demonstrated that contrary to what was believed traditionally, his family name was not Key and he was no relation of Willem Key. He only adopted the Key family name after taking over the workshop of Willem Key in 1567. Before that time he only used the monogram AT and the artist was referred to solely as Adriaen Thomasz. (meaning Adriaen, son of Thomas). It is clear that the reason why he adopted the family name is that Willem Key and his workshop enjoyed a high reputation and using Key as his family name was a good branding tool for his own work.

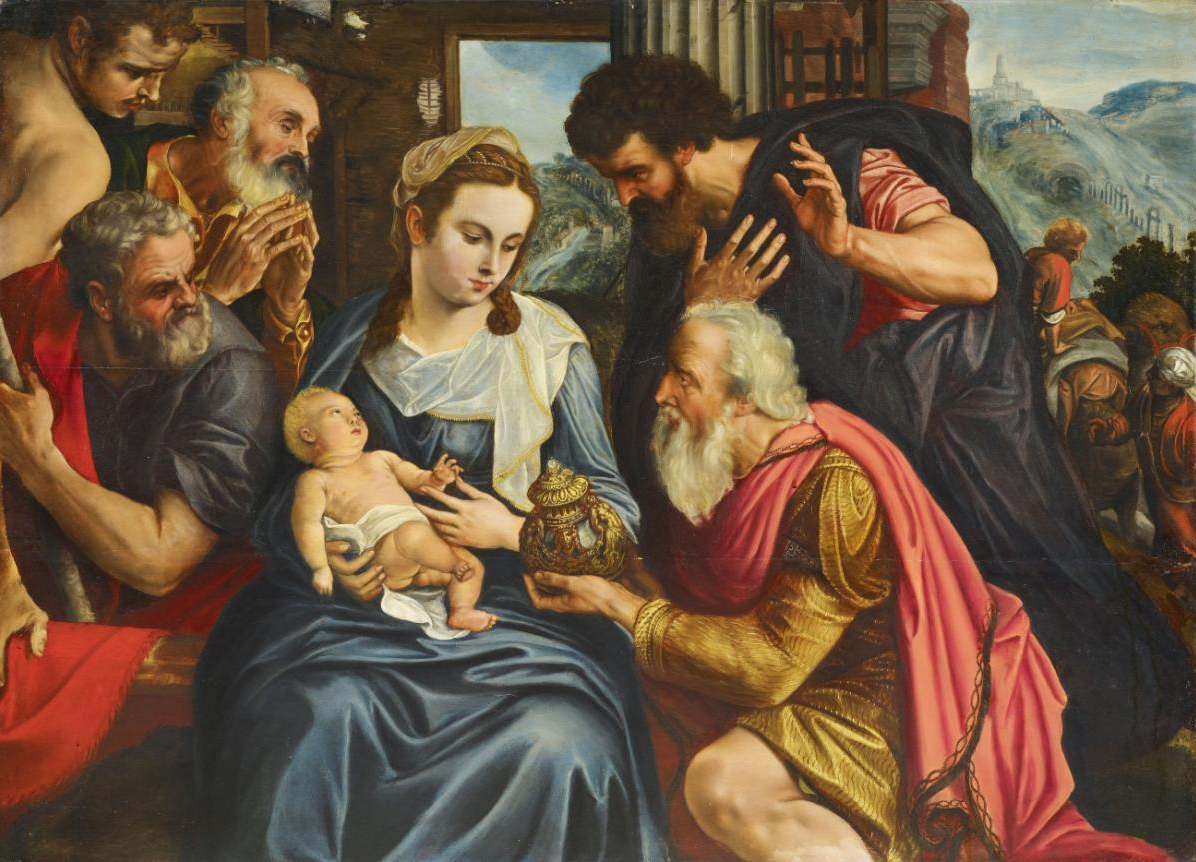
Adoration of the Magi

He was likely born in Antwerp around 1544. His father's first name was Thomas. He trained initially under the glass painter Jan Hack III and was registered as a pupil at the Antwerp Guild of Saint Luke in the guild year 1558. He became linked to the workshop of Willem Key at an early age and Willem Key is regarded as another master of Adriaen.

The Habsburg Netherlands were at the time affected by the Beeldenstorm (Iconoclastic Fury) that commenced in the early 1560s and reached its peak in 1566. During the period of iconoclasm, Catholic art and many forms of church fittings and decoration were destroyed by nominally Calvinist Protestant crowds who supported the Protestant Reformation. Antwerp was also affected by the wave of destruction. Key was able to emerge as one of the leading painters in Antwerp in the second half of the sixteenth century after the iconoclasm had abated. He was admitted as a master painter in the Guild in 1567.

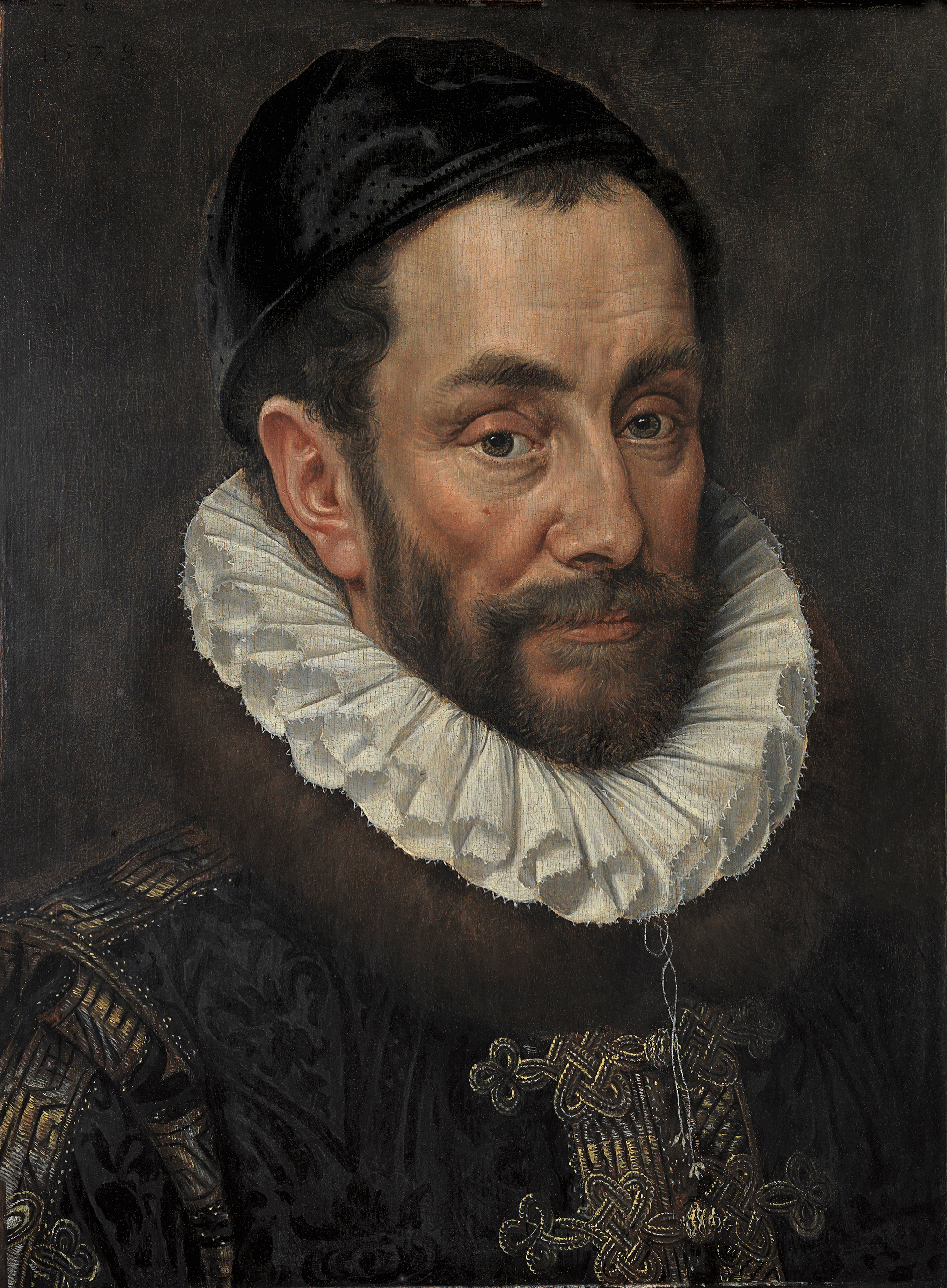
Portrait of William the Silent, 1579

When Willem Key died in 1568, Adriaen Thomasz took over his workshop. Although he had converted to Calvinism he did not leave Antwerp after the Fall of Antwerp in 1585 when the Calvinist government of Antwerp was overthrown by Spanish forces led by Alessandro Farnese. He received pupils in his workshop in 1582, 1588 and 1589. He received commissions from the leader of the Dutch Revolt William of Orange and the socio-economic elite of Antwerp. He is last mentioned in a document in 1589. It is not clear whether he died soon after or left Antwerp because of his Calvinist opinions. Although he was successful in life, he was quickly forgotten by the next generation. His works were therefore attributed to a whole range of artists, including Frans Pourbus the Elder and Willem Key.

== Work ==
Key was mainly a painter of portraits and altarpieces. He was active to a lesser extent as a printmaker. As some of his works are signed and some are dated it has been possible to reconstruct the painter's career. His dated works span the period from 1572 to 1580. No notable stylistic evolution can be seen throughout his career. His style, which is sometimes referred to as Mannerist, is very close to that of Willem Key particularly in the religious scenes. Some works cannot be attributed to either artist with certainty due to this similarity. Willem Key's style in turn can be described as being close to that of the leading painters of Antwerp of his time, such as Frans Floris and Michiel Coxie the Elder, who were both so-called Romanist painters. The Romanists were 16th century artists from the Low Countries who had travelled to Rome. In Rome they had absorbed the influence of leading Italian artists of the period such as Michelangelo and Raphael and his pupils. Upon their return home, these Northern artists created a Renaissance style, which assimilated Italian formal language.

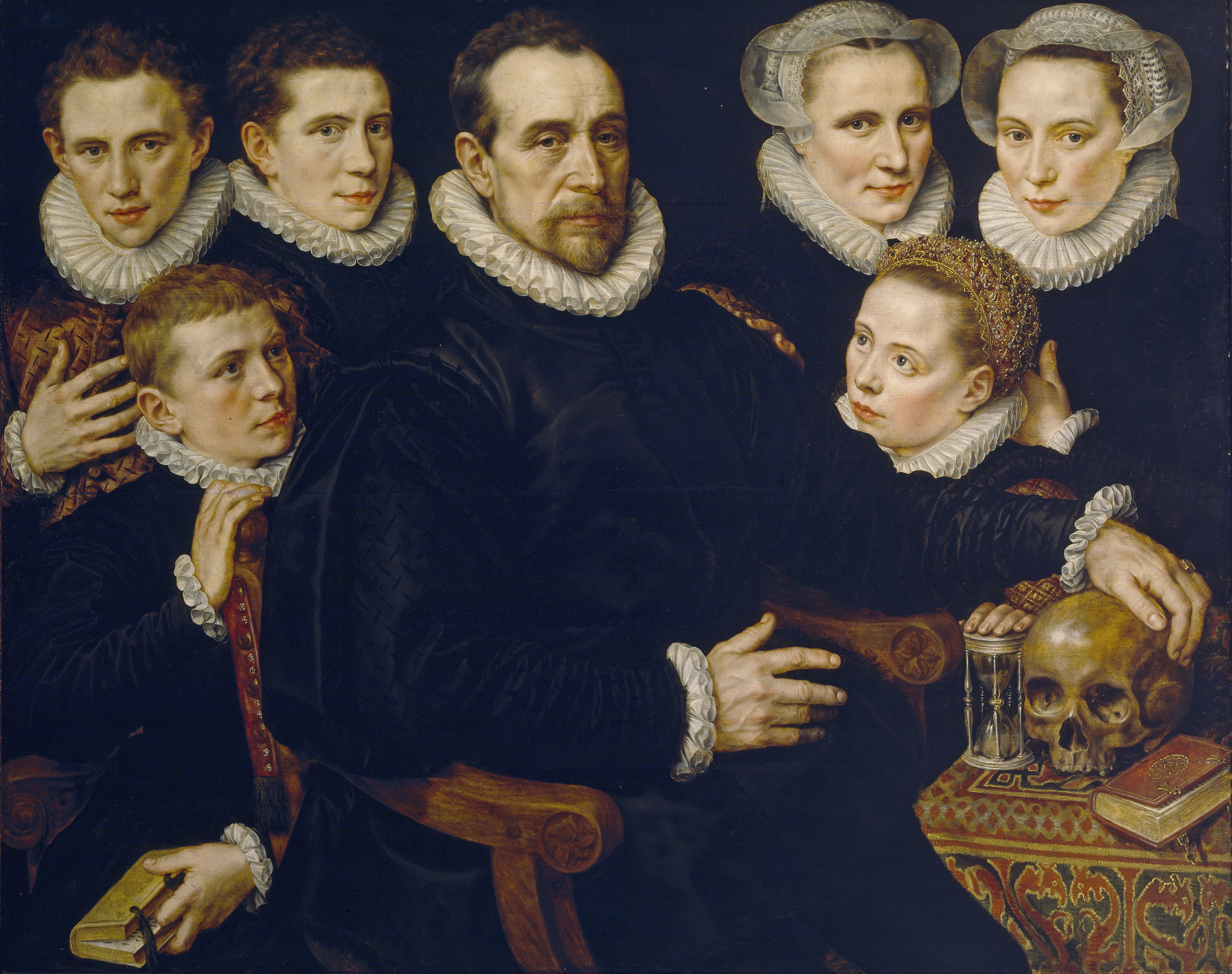
Portrait of an unknown family

In his portraits, the sitters are typically represented at half-, bust- or three quarter-length and against a neutral background. They are painted with great technical perfection and fidelity to nature. His brushwork gives an almost photographic representation of the subject while he has an impeccable eye for rendering details accurately. These qualities are on full display in his portrait of William the Silent, leader of the revolt against Spain. This work exists in three versions, one in the Rijksmuseum in Amsterdam, one in the Mauritshuis in The Hague and third one in the Thyssen-Bornemisza Museum in Madrid. Only the latter version is dated and was painted in 1579. All three are considered autograph and to go back to a now lost original. There are some minor differences between the versions in some details. The sitter is posed against a dark background against which the flesh tones of the face, the white ruff and the elegant grey and gold decoration of his clothes stand out. The face is rendered with much detail in line with the Northern portraiture of the period. At the time this portrait was painted, William the Silent was at the height of his career. This can also be seen in the portrait. He is not shown in armour, but in neat and opulent civilian clothes. In this portrait from Key's later period, the influence of Antonis Mor is shown in its increased interest in conveying the sitter's social status.

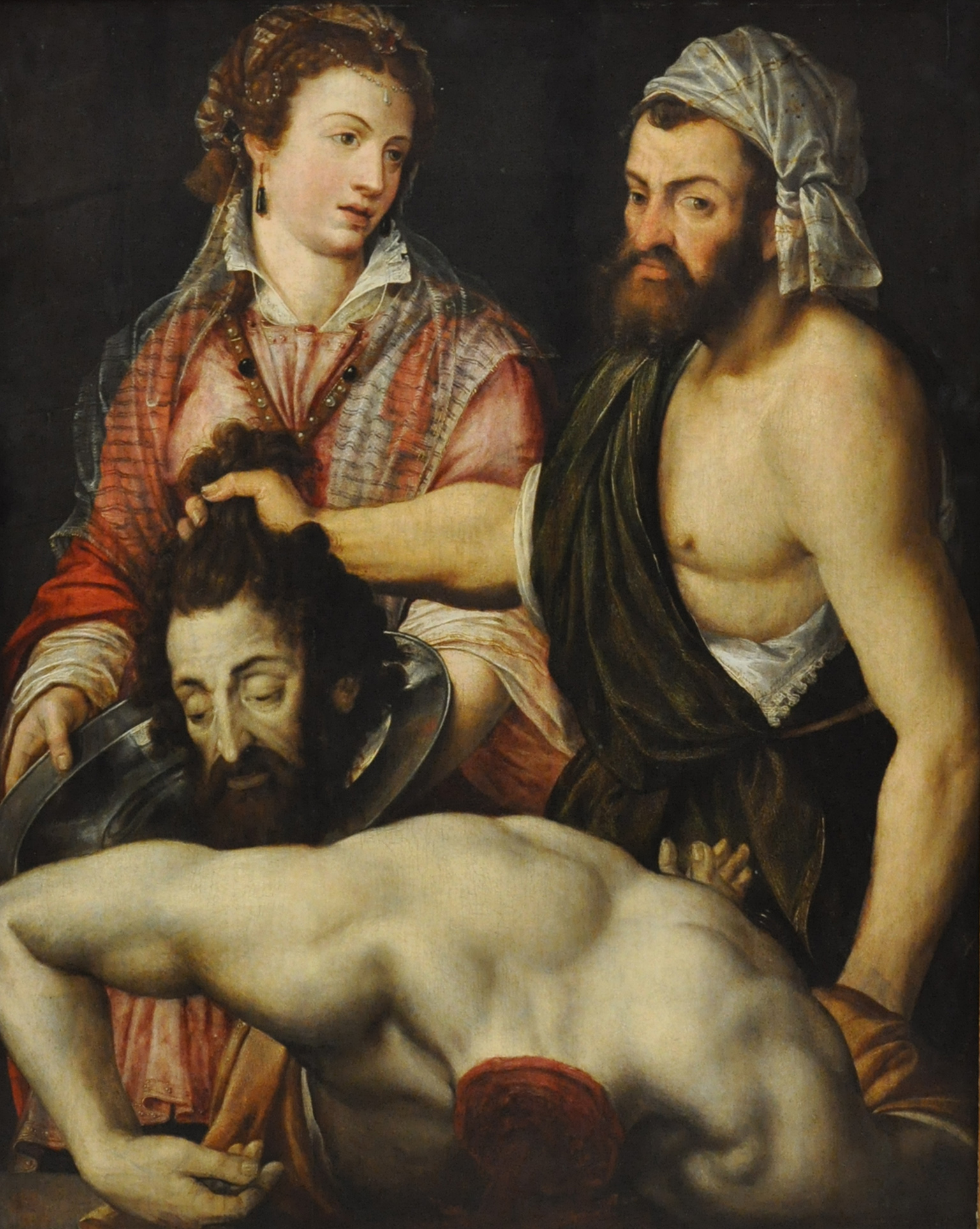
The head of St John the Baptist

In his group and family portraits Key shows his originality. This is demonstrated in his Portrait of an unknown family (Museo del Prado, 1583, monogrammed ATK). In this group portrait of a Flemish bourgeois family Key has placed the father and his six children very close together so that they occupy almost the entire canvas and acquire a monumental character. The sitters are distributed in a symmetrical and balanced manner. The ruffs and white caps and the direction of the light attract the attention of the viewer to the individual faces of the family members. The father is seated on a leather chair, before a table covered with a red carpet, on which are placed an hourglass, a skull and a book. The children are standing in two planes according to their age with the females on the left and the males on the right. Key enlivens the picture by placing the children in various poses. The two youngest look at their father, the boy holding a book opened in one hand and resting the other on the father's chair, while the girl has placed one hand on the hourglass and the other on her father's shoulder. The skull on which one hand of the father rests and the hourglass evoke the theme of vanitas, i.e. the philosophical view that the passage of time and the fleeting nature of things will ultimately lead to death. This motif also evokes the absent wife and mother whose death unites the family in grief.

In his religious and devotional works, Key reacted to the objections raised by his Calvinist brethren who had launched the destruction of religious art on religious grounds during the Beeldenstorm of 1566. His solution was to abandon the iconographic tradition and to return to the language of the bible as a source. This led him to limit the iconography in his religious works to a minimum. An example of this is his Last Supper (Royal Museum of Fine Arts Antwerp, 1575, monogrammed) in which he re-invents this famous scene from the Bible using the device of the portrait historié, i.e. depicting historical figures through contemporary figures, including himself. In the Last Supper Saint Peter and the brown-haired apostle behind Judas are clearly historical figures while the servant is possibly a self-portrait in the servant on the right. Similarly, in the Adoration of the Magi (Lempertz (Cologne) 11 May 2013 auction, lot 1019) the head of the young man with individualised facial features in the upper left corner may be a self-portrait. In leaving out the African king, Key has also strictly followed the biblical sources which do not mention such a king.

The Last Supper

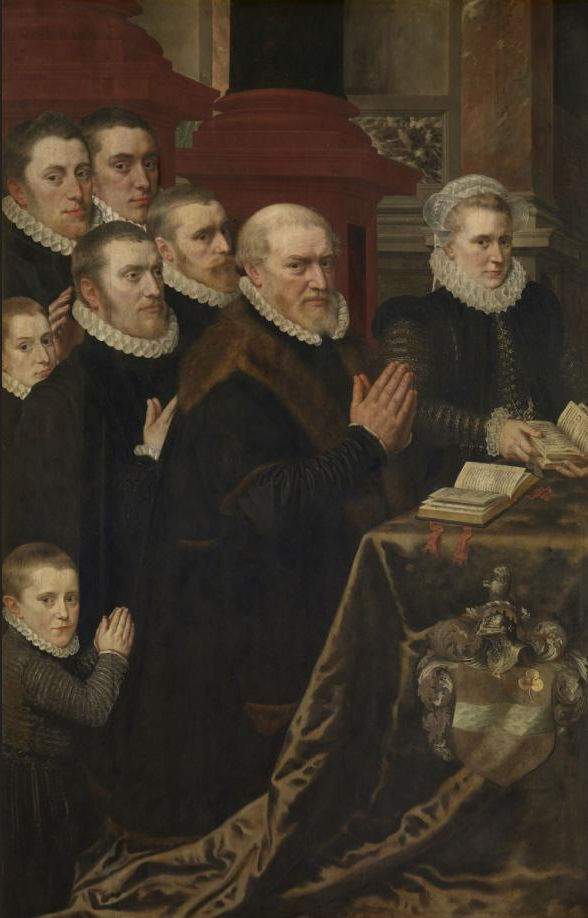

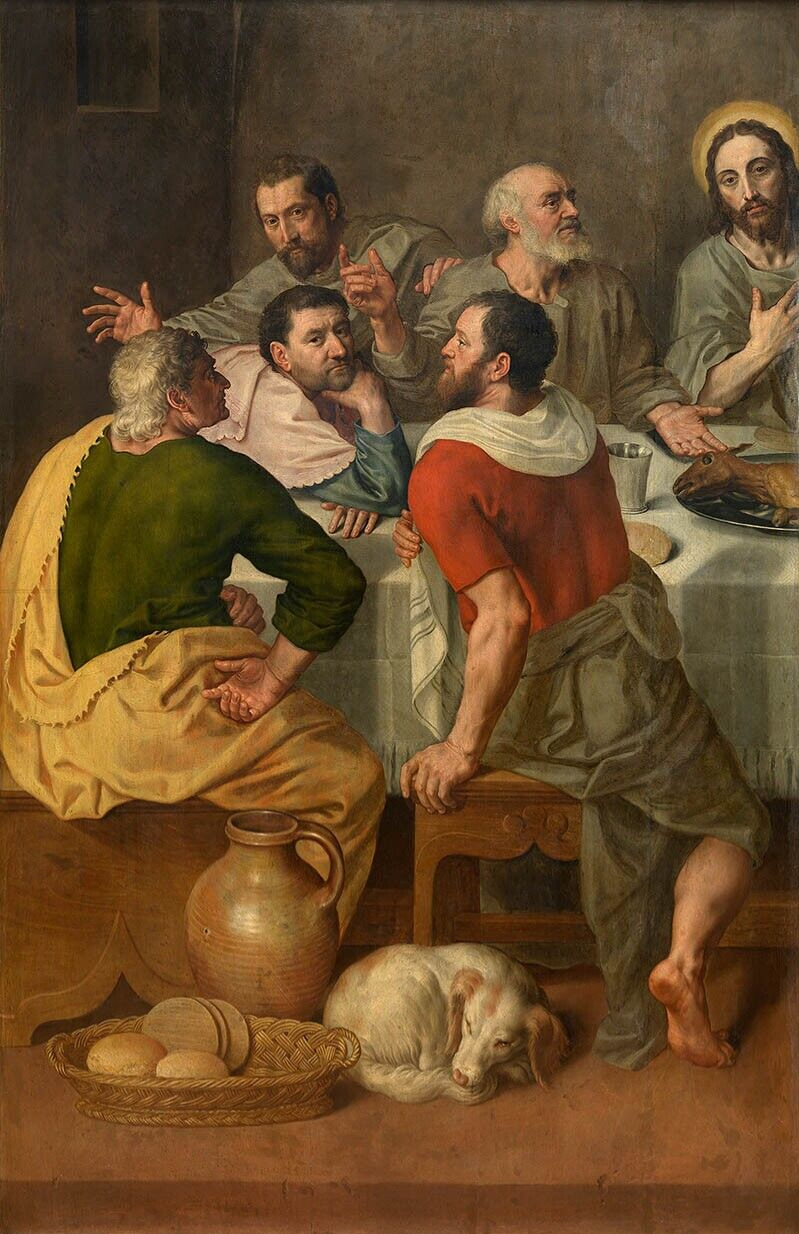

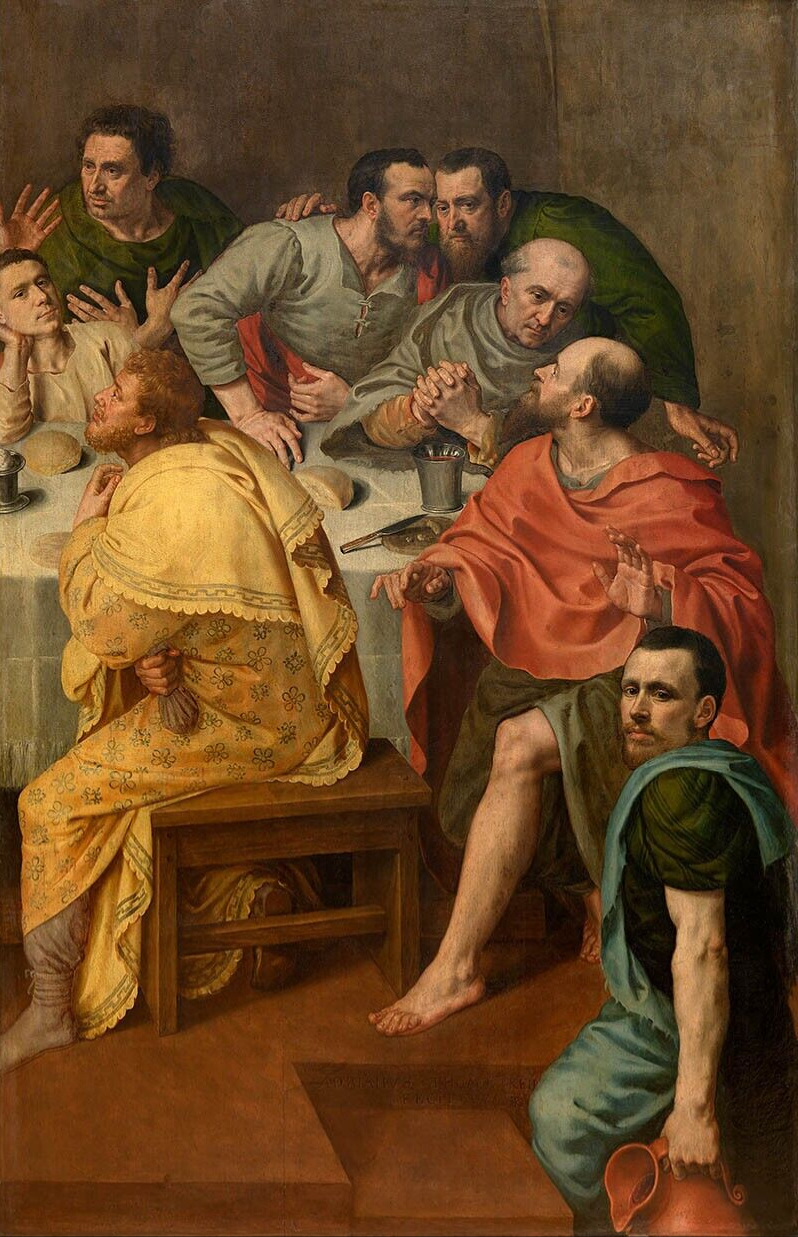

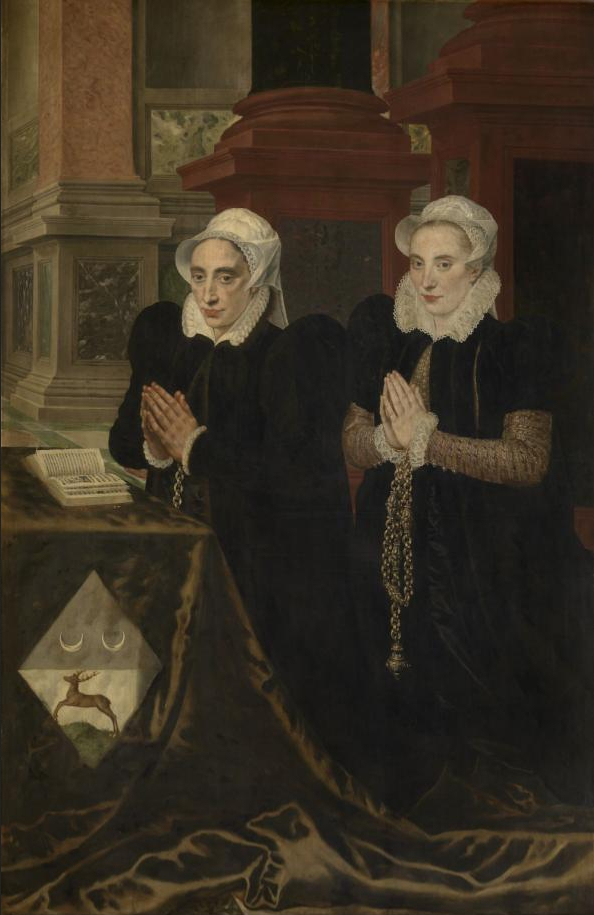

Key made a number of woodcuts of biblical scenes. An example is the Nebuchadnezzar casting Shadrach, Meshach and Abednego into the fiery furnace of circa 1558. The woodcut is taken from Daniel 3:22–26. Nebuchadnezzar, the King of Babylon, orders the Israelites Shadrach, Meshach and Abednego to be cast into a furnace for refusing to worship his golden idol. When their captors try to execute the sentence they are themselves killed by the heat while the Israelites remain unharmed. The woodcut contains many of the elements in Philips Galle's engraving of Nebuchadnezzar Casting the Children of Israel into the Fiery Furnace after a design by Maarten van Heemskerck, but with an increased emphasis on the role of the king. Nebuchadnezzar is in the center of the composition, both arms extended, while the Israelites in the furnace are in the background. The message of the bible story and the woodcut is to show that through God's grace his obedient worshippers are saved while the unfaithful perish.
