= Cardinal de Granvelle's Dwarf =

Painting by Antonis Mor

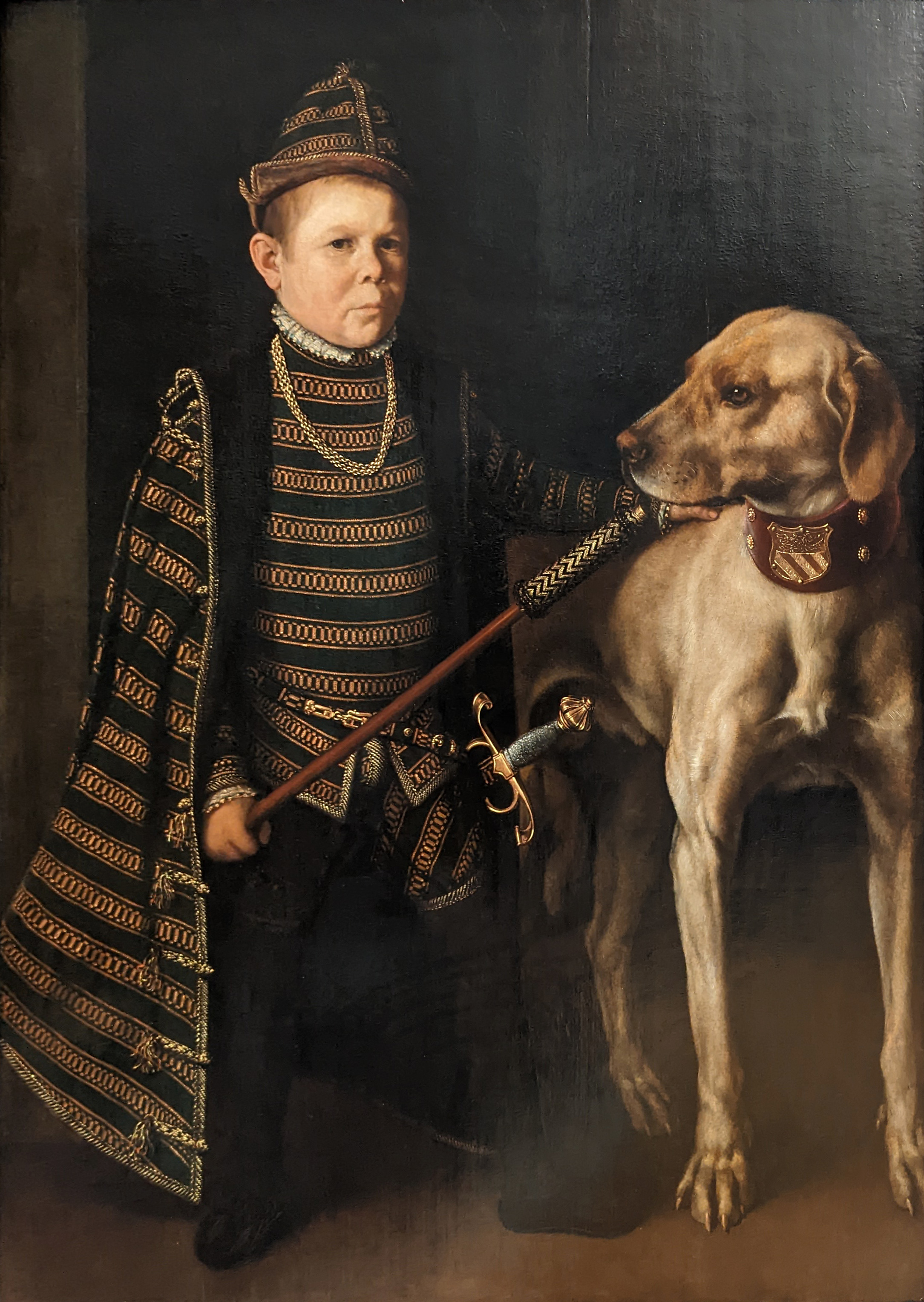

Cardinal de Granvelle's Dwarf or Cardinal de Gravelle's Dwarf Holding a Large Dog is a c.1560 oil on panel painting by Antonis Mor. It shows a person with dwarfism in the household of Antoine Perrenot de Granvelle, resting one hand on a dog (whose collar bears Perrenot de Granvelle's coat of arms, only identified as such in 1899) and holding a sceptre in another. It formed part of superintendent Nicolas Fouquet's collection before being seized from him by Louis XIV and is now in the Louvre Museum (INV 1583).
