= Antonis Mor =

Painter from the Northern Netherlands (1519–1575)

Anthonis Mor
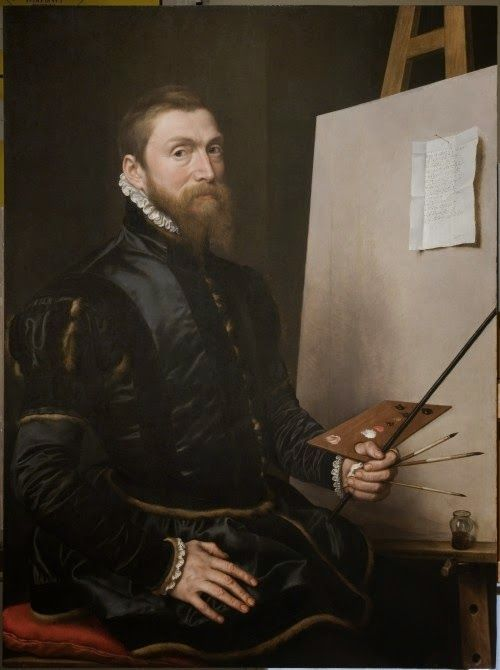
- Self-portrait (1558) at the Uffizi
- Born: Anthonis Mor c. 1517; Utrecht, Prince-Bishopric of Utrecht
- Died: 1577 (aged 60); Antwerp, Duchy of Brabant
- Known for: Painting
- Movement: High Renaissance

Anthonis Mor, also known as Anthonis Mor van Dashorst and Antonio Moro (c. 1517 – 1577), was a Netherlandish portrait painter, much in demand by the courts of Europe. He has also been referred to as Antoon, Anthonius, Anthonis or Mor van Dashorst, and as António Mouro, Anthony More, etc., but signed most of his portraits as Anthonis Mor.

Mor developed a formal style for court portraits, largely based on Titian, that was extremely influential on court painters across Europe, especially in the Iberian Peninsula, where it created a tradition that led to Diego Velázquez. His works can include considerable psychological penetration, especially in portraits of men, but always give the subject a grand and self-possessed air.

== Early life and education ==
Mor was born in Utrecht, Netherlands, by some estimation between 1516 and 1520. Little is known about his early life, except that his artistic education commenced under Jan van Scorel. His earliest known work is a portrait which is now in a collection in Stockholm, dated 1538.

== Painting career ==
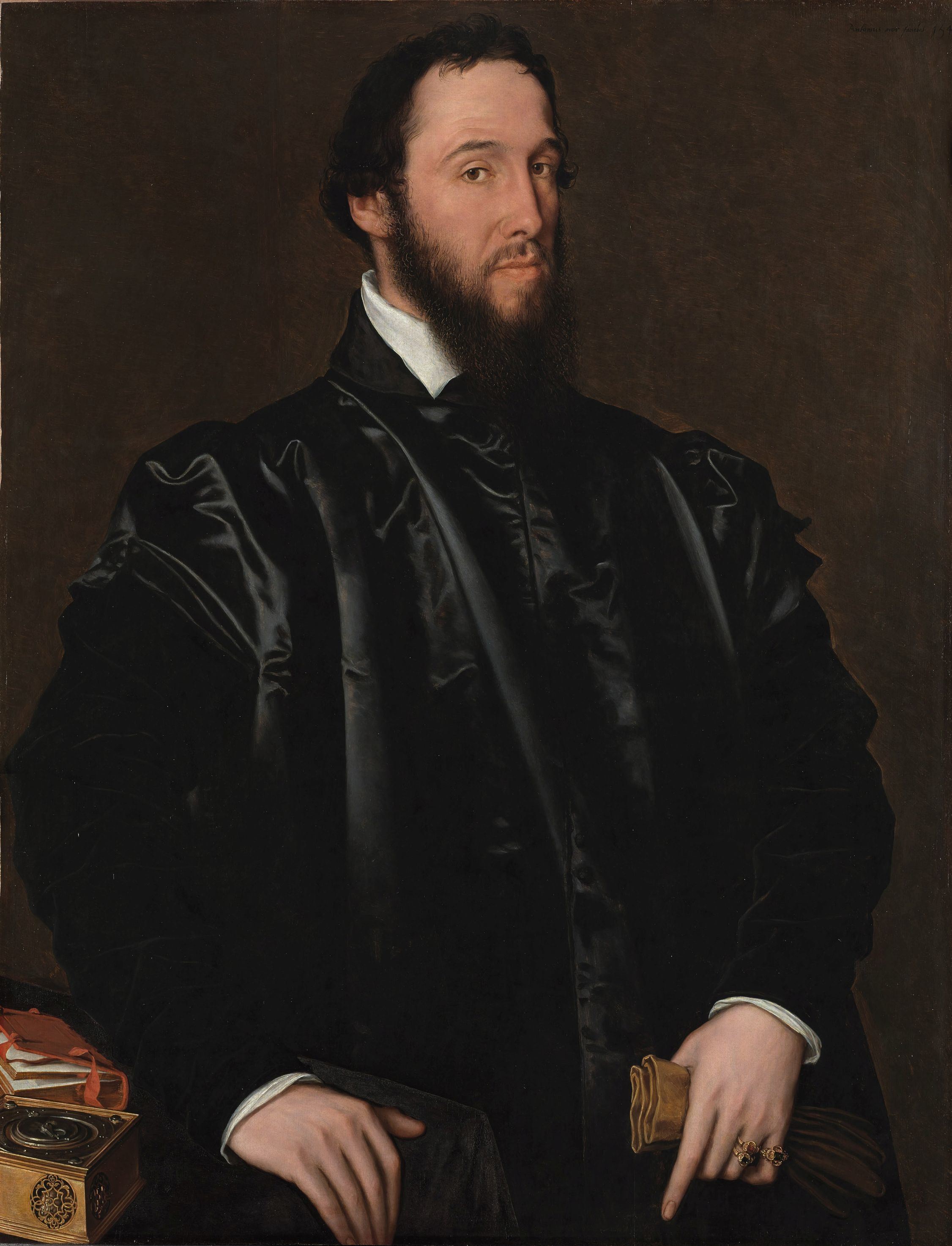
Portrait of Granvelle

A group of Knights of St. John at Utrecht, supposed to have been painted about 1541; and a picture of two pilgrims at the Gemäldegalerie, Berlin, dated 1544; and the portrait of an unknown woman, in the Palais des Beaux-Arts de Lille, were probably among his earliest works. Their authenticity has not been established.

=== Antwerp ===
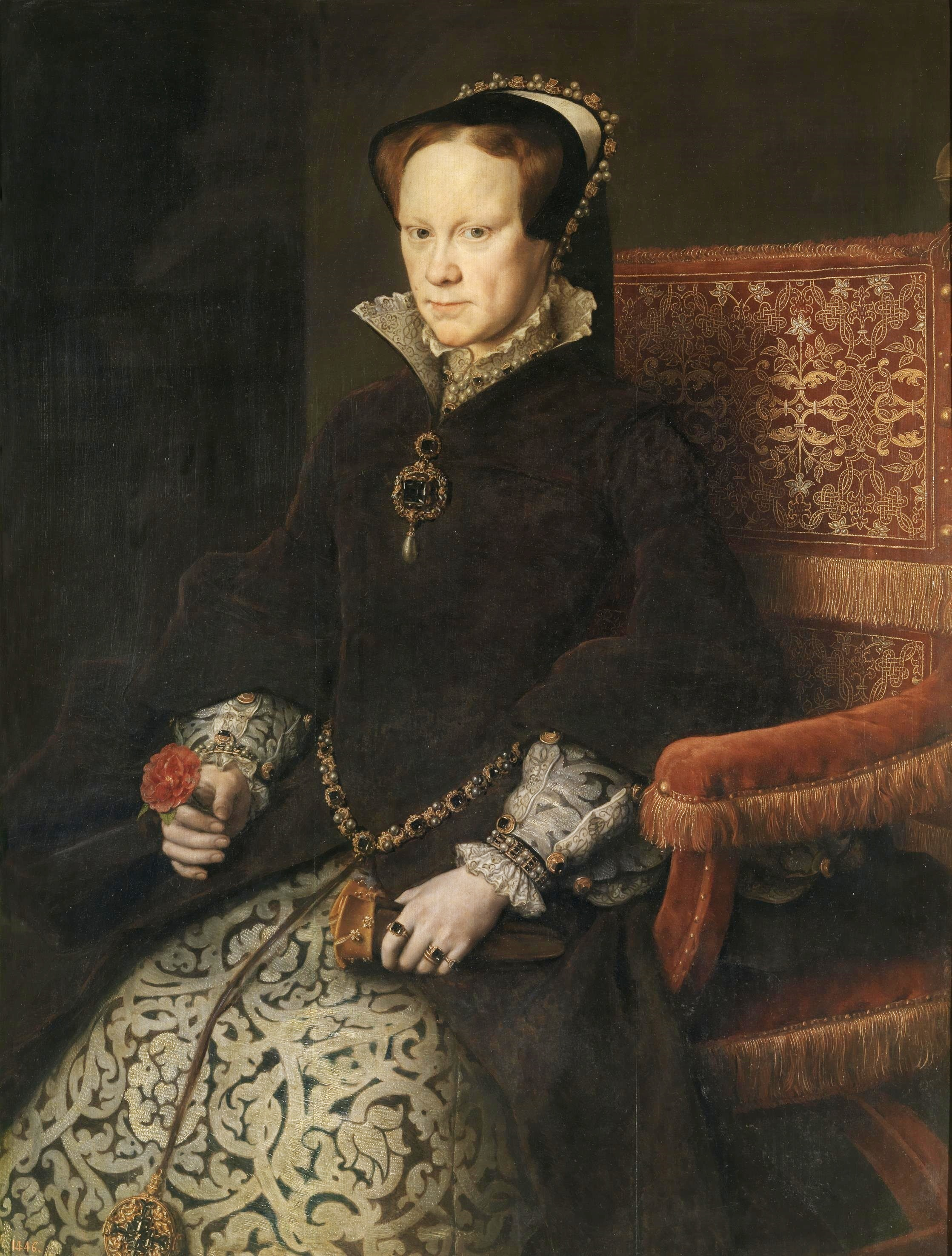
Portrait of Queen Mary I of England, 1554

In 1547 Mor was received as a member of the Venerable Guild of St. Luke at Antwerp, and shortly afterwards (about 1548) he attracted the attention of Cardinal Antoine Perrenot de Granvelle, Bishop of Arras, who became his steady patron. Of the portraits executed during the early period of his career as de Granvelle's protégé, two are especially notable: one of the bishop himself (in the Kunsthistoriches Museum in Vienna), and one of the Duke of Alba, which now belongs to the Hispanic Society of America. Between 1549 and 1550 Philip, Prince of Asturias (1527–1598) traveled around the Netherlands to present himself as the future ruler. Mor painted his portrait in Brussels in 1549. He probably visited Italy (when exactly is not known), where he copied some works by Titian, notably the Danaë

=== Portugal ===
In the middle of 1550 Mor left for Lisbon with a commission from Mary of Hungary to portray the Portuguese branch of the family. Mor probably traveled via Valladolid, where he painted the portraits of Maximilian II and his wife Maria of Austria, their daughter Anna and the son of Philip II of Spain, Don Carlos. In Lisbon, Mor portrayed King John III, Queen Catherine, Prince João Manuel and Philip II's future wife, Princess Maria. Little more is known about Mor's stay in Portugal, but he was definitely back in Brussels by November 1553.

=== England ===
After the sudden death of the king of England, Edward VI, in July 1553, Charles V, Holy Roman Emperor now saw the possibility of an alliance between Spain and England. The engagement between Philip and his Portuguese princess was broken and negotiations started for a marriage with the successor to the English throne, Mary Tudor. During these negotiations, Mor was sent to England to paint a portrait of Mary, but the exact date of the painting is unknown. This portrait was much appreciated in England and Mor made at least three versions, which became much the best-known likeness of the Queen. On 20 December 1553, Philip officially appointed Mor as painter in his service.

=== Brussels and Utrecht ===
In October 1555, Charles V abdicated from the throne. During the ceremonies and festivities surrounding the coronation of his son Philip as king of Spain, Mor would have received many commissions for paintings. Many of these paintings are lost or only known through copies.

Mor was very productive after Philip's ascension to the throne, and produced some of his most important portraits in this period, such as the portrait of Prince Willem I van Oranje-Nassau (William the Silent) (1555), the portrait of Alessandro Farnese (1557) and a new portrait of Philip II. Other important works from this period include the portrait of Jane Dormer (1558), the portraits of Jean Lecocq and his wife (1559), and the portrait of Jan van Scorel (1559), which was at a later time to be hung at his tomb and now belongs to the Society of Antiquaries of London. Following the death of Mary Tudor in 1558, King Philip was remarried in June 1559 to Elisabeth of Valois, whom Mor portrayed c. 1561. This portrait appears to have been lost. Also from this period dates the only known self-portrait of Mor, now in the Uffizi gallery, and one of his (presumed) wife, now in the Prado (see image gallery below).

=== The Spanish Court ===
It seems likely that Mor accompanied King Philip on his return to Spain in 1559. That Mor stayed at the Spanish court is confirmed by the letters which Philip regularly sent to Mor after he had left again in 1561. In his letters, Philip requested Mor's return to court several times, but the painter never complied with his repeated requests. Among the works which Mor supposedly painted in Spain are the Portrait of Juana of Austria and the Portrait of Don Carlos. A much-praised work from this period is the Portrait of Pejerón, the fool of the Duke of Benavente and the Duke of Alba. There has been extensive speculation about the reason for Mor's departure from the Spanish court. According to Carel van Mander, Mor became too confidential with the King and this aroused the suspicion of the Inquisition. He may also have been alarmed by the increasingly repressive Counter-Reformation tenor of the Spanish court. Mor's pupil Alonso Sánchez Coello continued to work in his master's style, and replaced him as the Spanish court painter.

== Return to the Netherlands ==
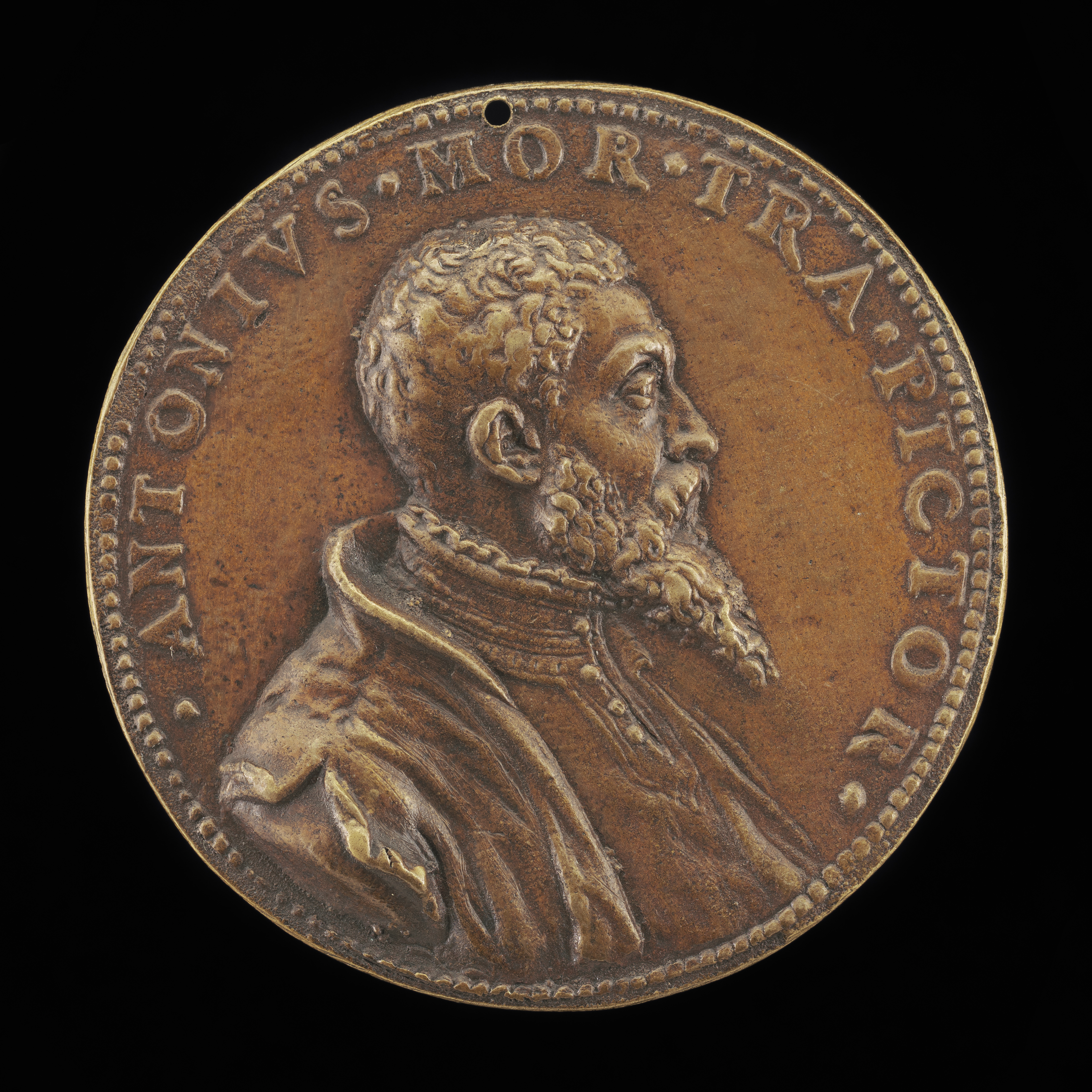
Steven van Herwijck, Antonis Mor, medal in the National Gallery of Art

On his return to the Netherlands, Mor probably traveled back and forth between Utrecht, Antwerp and Brussels. In this period he was in regular contact with de Granvelle and also worked at the Dutch court, where he portrayed Margaret of Parma. After his return, Mor focused on the portrayal of citizens, especially of merchants and their wives in Antwerp. In addition to portraits like these (which included the Portrait of Thomas Gresham), he also painted artisans, such as the goldsmith Steven van Herwijck (1564). These works are markedly different from the paintings Mor produced for the court, showing off another side of his talent. When de Granvelle returned to France and the Netherlands showed increasing social and political unrest, Mor experienced some financial hardship. His financial problems were partially solved when the Duke of Alba granted him commissions and favors. He is not known to have been in Utrecht after 24 July 1567 and from 1568 onwards Mor lived in Antwerp where, in 1572, he registered as a master with the Antwerp guild. At Antwerp he painted a Venus and Adonis for the new Stadhuis. It is possible that he visited England once again in 1568, judging from the Portrait of a Nobleman with Dog and of the Portrait of Sir Henry Lee, which have been attributed to him. In 1559 and 1562 Mor painted two portraits of Margaret of Parma. On her way to Spain, Anne of Austria spent some time in Antwerp, where she was painted by Mor in 1570. Mor's portrait of Anna is his last-known court painting, although he was still being referred to as Philip II's court painter in 1573.

Little is known about Mor's life and career after 1570. It seems likely that he lost custom, maybe as result of competition by painters such as Adriaen Thomasz Key, Frans Pourbus the Elder (1545–1581) and Frans Floris (1519/20–1570). The last portrait attributed to Mor is the Portrait of Hubertus Goltzius, dated 1576. Toward the end of his life, Mor focused on history paintings of religious and mythological subjects, but in this field of work he would never equal his earlier success as a portrait painter. He is believed to have been working on a Circumcision for the Cathedral of Antwerp when he died in 1576.

== Main works ==
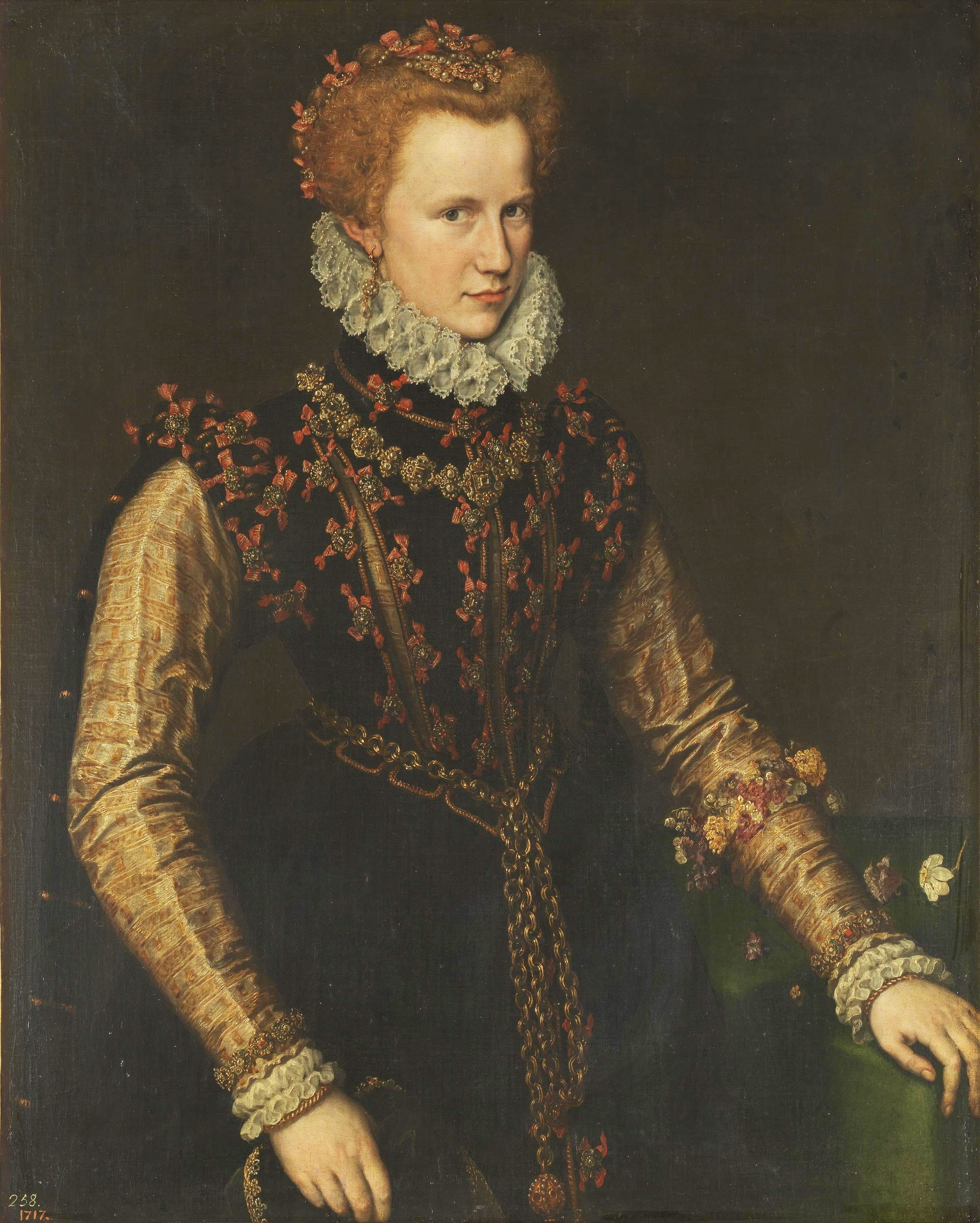
Possible portrait of Jane Dormer, c. 1558

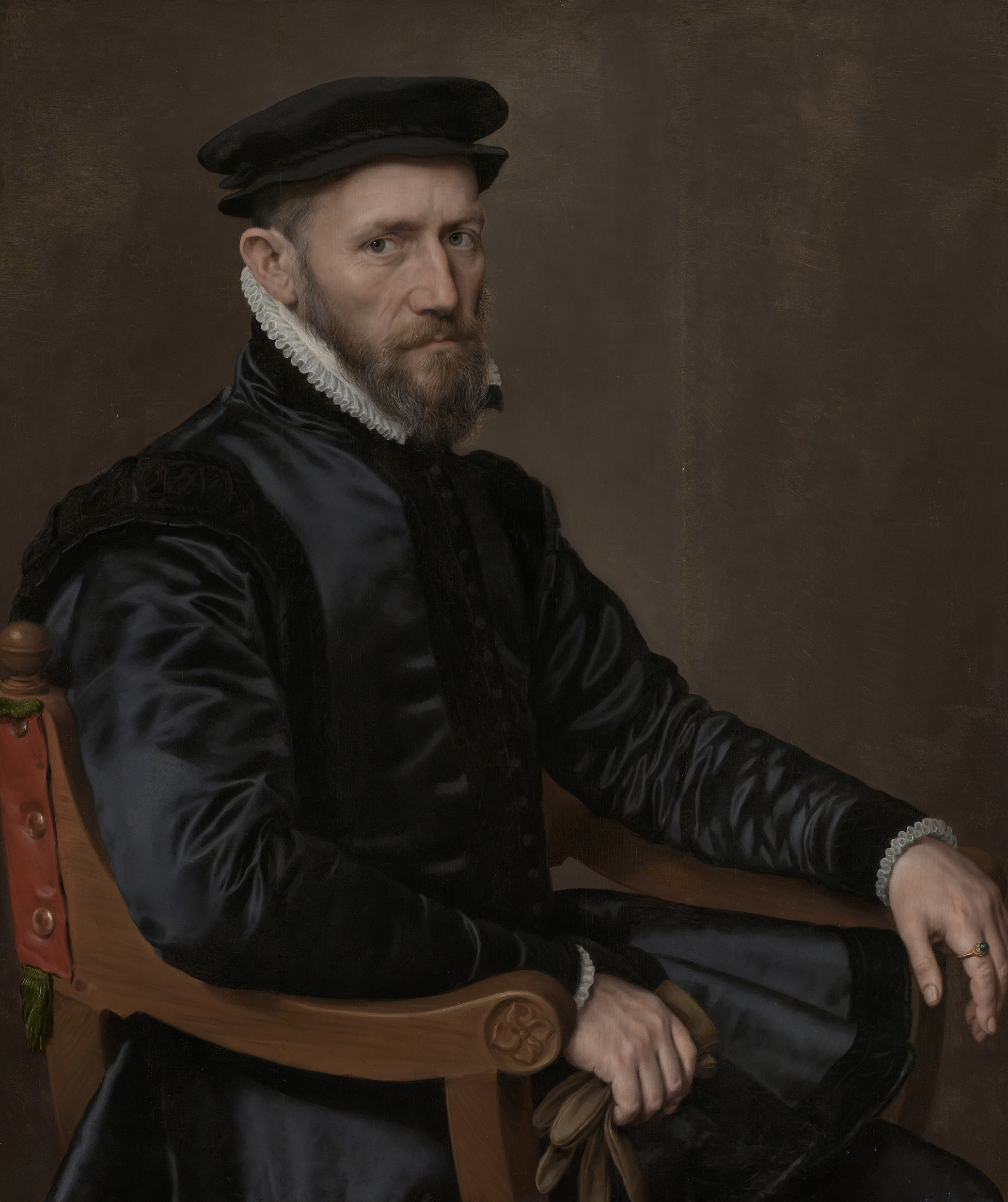
Portrait of Thomas Gresham (1560)

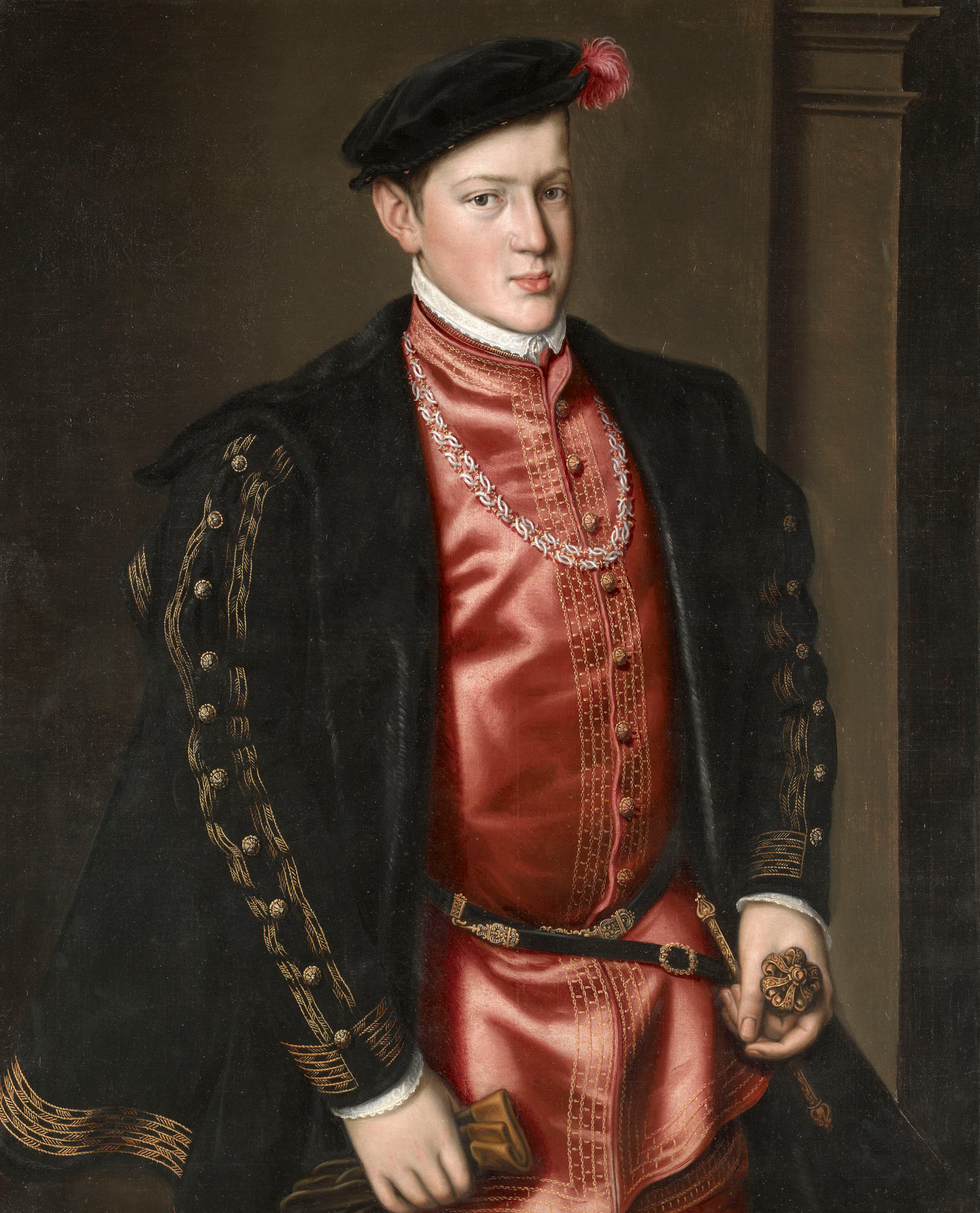
Portrait of João of Portugal (1552)

Many of Mor's portraits were copied by others. Among those whose works have been confused with Mor's are Alonso Sánchez Coello, Francisco de Holanda, and Cristóvão Lopes. A large number of engravings based on his work also circulated.

NB: Some attributions and locations may be out of date.

- Portrait of Philip II (c. 1549–1550) – Oil on oak, 107.5 x 83.3 cm, Bilbao Fine Arts Museum
- Portrait of Cardinal Antoine Perrenot de Granvelle (1549) – Oil on panel, 107 x 82 cm, Kunsthistorisches Museum, Vienna. See image above
- Cardinal Granvelle's Dwarf with a Dog (1549–1553) – Oil on canvas, 126 x 92 cm, Louvre, Paris
- Portrait of a Man Pointing at a Table Clock (c. 1550) – Oil on canvas, 100 x 80 cm, Louvre, Paris
- Portrait of a Giovanni Battista di Castaldo (c. 1550) – Oil on panel, 107.6 x 82.2 cm, Museo Thyssen-Bornemisza, Madrid
- Portrait of John III of Portugal (c. 1550) – Oil on canvas, 101 x 81 cm, Lázaro Galdiano Museum, Madrid; see image gallery below.
- Portrait of Catherine of Austria (c. 1552) – Oil on panel, 107 x 84 cm, Museo del Prado, Madrid, inv. 2109; see image gallery below.
- Portrait of João Manuel, Prince of Portugal (c. 1552) – Oil on panel, 107 x 84 cm, Hampton Court Palace.
- Portrait of Infanta Maria, Lady of Viseu (c. 1552) – Oil on canvas, 100 x 87 cm, Convent of Las Descalzas Reales, Madrid, inv. PN822.
- Portrait of Isabel, Duchess of Guimarães (1552) – Oil on panel, 55 x 50 cm, Private collection, Germany.
- Portrait of Prince William I of Orange/Nassau (c. 1554) – Oil on panel, 105 x 81.5 cm, Staatliche Museen, Kassel; see image gallery below.
- Portrait of a Man (c. 1555-1560) – Oil on wood, 97.8 x 71.2 cm, National Gallery of Canada, Ottawa
- Portrait of Philip II of Spain in Armor (c. 1557) – Oil on canvas, 186 x 82 cm, Monasterio de San Lorenzo, El Escorial, inv. 1653; see image gallery below.
- Portrait of a Man in Armor (1558) – Oil on canvas, 111 x 80 cm, J. Paul Getty Museum, Los Angeles
- Portrait of a Young Man [by an anonymous follower of Mor] (1558) – Oil on panel, 97.5 x 69.9 cm, National Gallery of Art, Washington
- Self-portrait (1558) – Oil on wood, 113 x 84 cm, Uffizi, Florence; see image above
- Portrait of Simon Renard (1560) – Oil on canvas, Musée du Temps, Besançon.
- Portrait of a Lady (c. 1560) – Oil on oak, 116.8 x 86.9 cm, National Gallery of Canada, Ottawa
- Portrait of Philip de Montmorency, Count of Hoorn (c. 1560) – Oil on panel. Present location not known.
- Portrait of Sir Thomas Gresham (1560–1565) – Oil on panel, 90 x 75.5 cm, Rijksmuseum, Amsterdam; see image above
- Portrait of Lady Gresham (Anne Femely) (1560–1565) – Oil on oak, 88 x 75.5 cm, Rijksmuseum, Amsterdam
- Portrait of Metgen, wife of the artist (also known as Portrait of a married woman) (c. 1560-1565) – Oil on panel, 100 x 80 cm, Museo del Prado, Madrid, inv. 2114; see image gallery below.
- Portrait of Spanish Nobleman, (c. 1560) – National Museum of Serbia, Belgrade, Oil on canvas 130 x 90 cm
- Portrait of a Man (1560–1577) – Oil on oak, 49.5 x 40.6 cm, National Gallery, London
- Portrait of a Nobleman, said to be Hernán Cortés (date unknown) – Lobkowicz Palace, Prague
- Portrait of Margaret, Duchess of Parma (c. 1562) – oil on canvas, Gemäldegalerie, Berlin, inv. L310A; see image gallery below.
- Portrait of Jeanne Lullier (1563) – Oil on canvas, Musée du Temps, Besançon.
- Portrait of Maria of Portugal, Princess of Parma (c. 1565) – Oil on panel, 35 x 15 cm, Museo del Prado, Madrid, inv. 2117.
- Portrait of Sir Henry Lee of Ditchley (1568) – Oil on panel, 64.1 x 53.3 cm, National Portrait Gallery, London; see image gallery below.
- Portrait of a Gentleman (1569) – Oil on canvas, 119.7 x 88.3 cm, National Gallery of Art, Washington
- Portrait of Hendrik Goltzius (c. 1570) – Oil on wood, 66 x 50 cm, Royal Museums of Fine Arts of Belgium, Brussels
- Portrait of a Gentleman (c. 1570) – Oil on panel, 122 x 98.5 cm, North Carolina Museum of Art
- Portrait of Mary I of England (date unknown – Oil on wood, 109 x 84 cm, Museo del Prado, Madrid; see image above
- Portrait of a Lady – Oil on wood panel, 107 x 72.1 cm, National Gallery of Victoria.
- Portrait of Margaret, Duchess of Parma (date unknown) – Oil on panel transferred on canvas, 97.8 x 71.7 cm, Philadelphia Museum of Art.
- Portrait of Jane Dormer (?) – Museo del Prado, Madrid; see image above.
- Portrait of Jan Scorel (1559–1560) – Oil on panel, Society of Antiquaries of London.

== Gallery ==
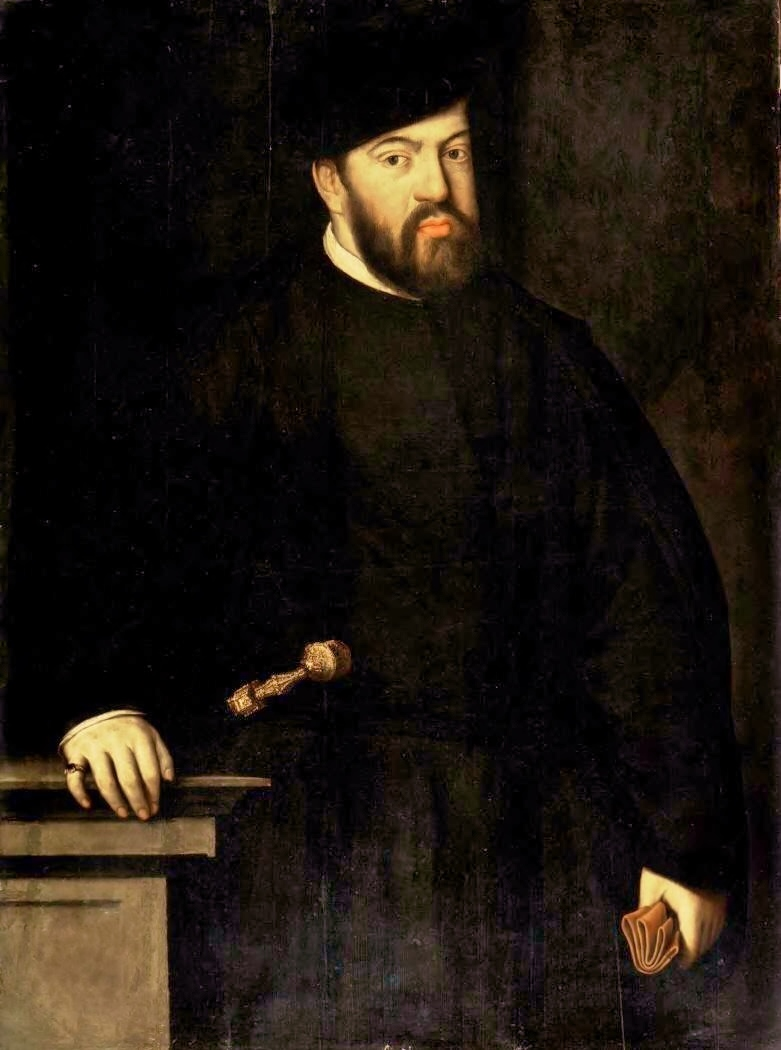
King John III of Portugal

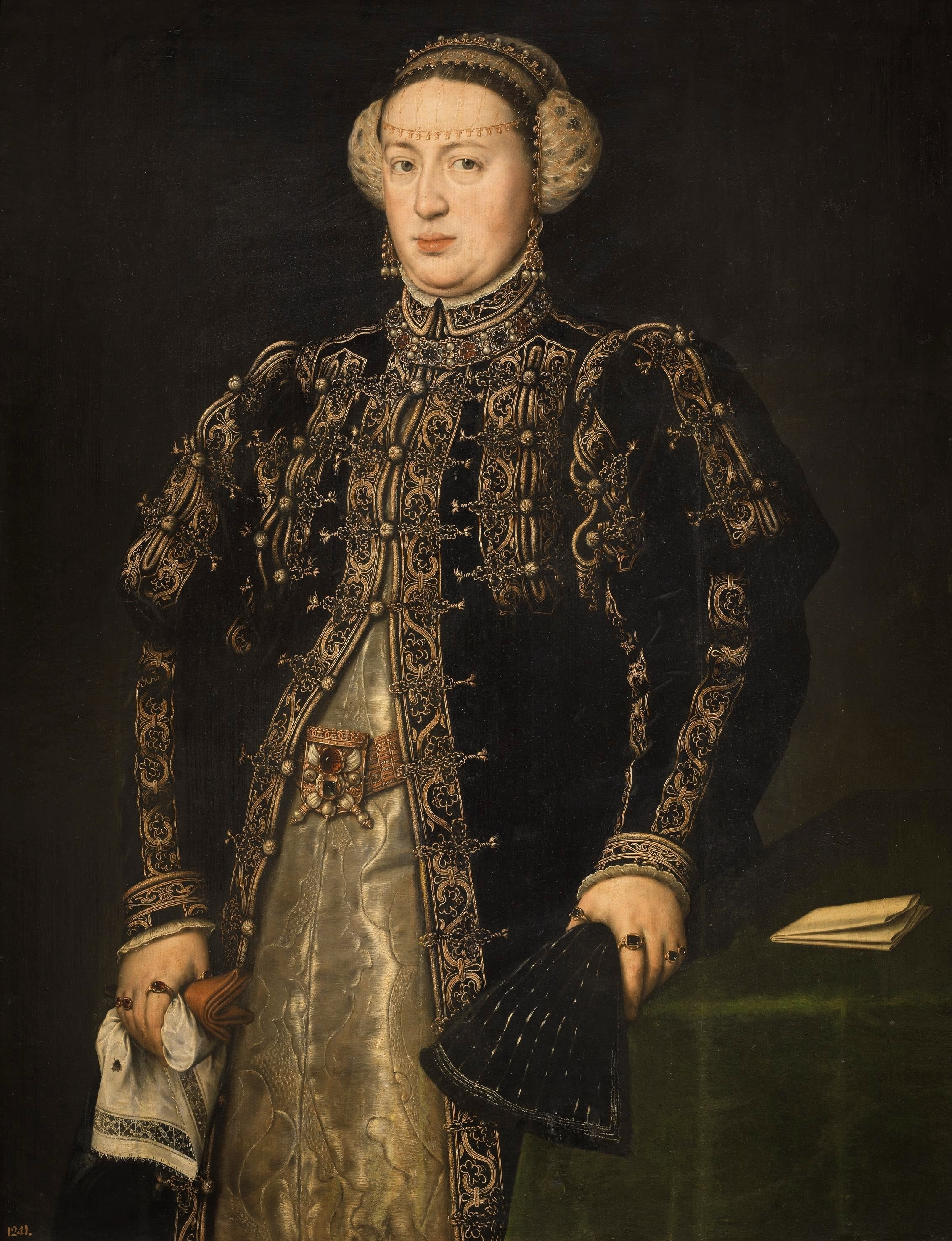
Catherine of Portugal

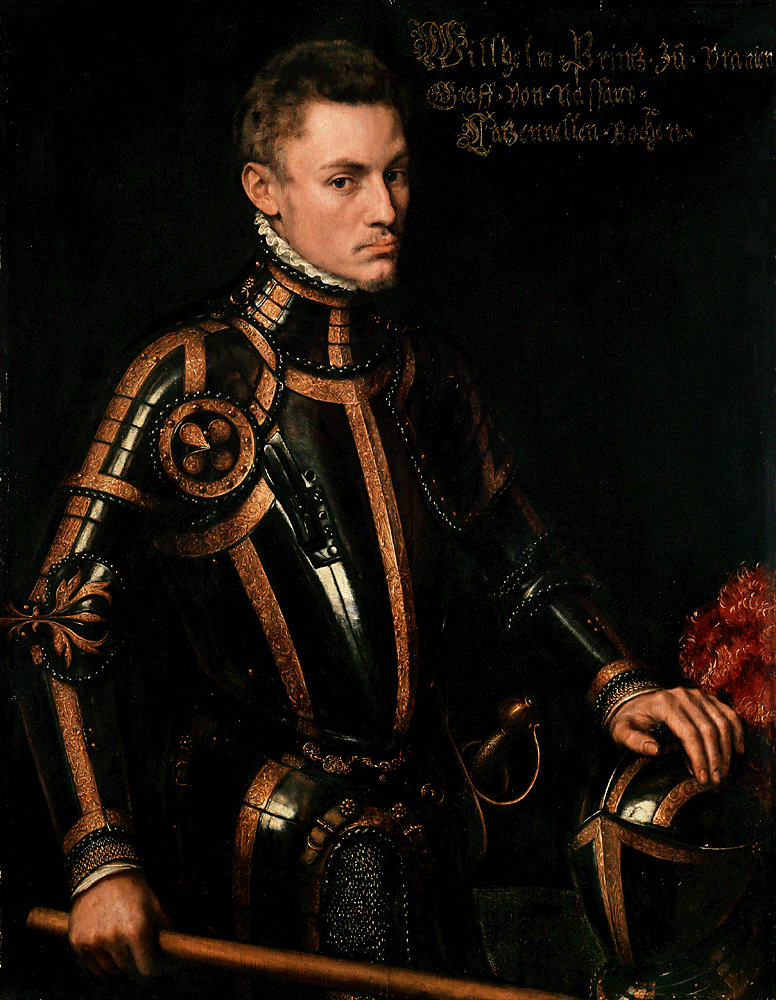
William of Orange

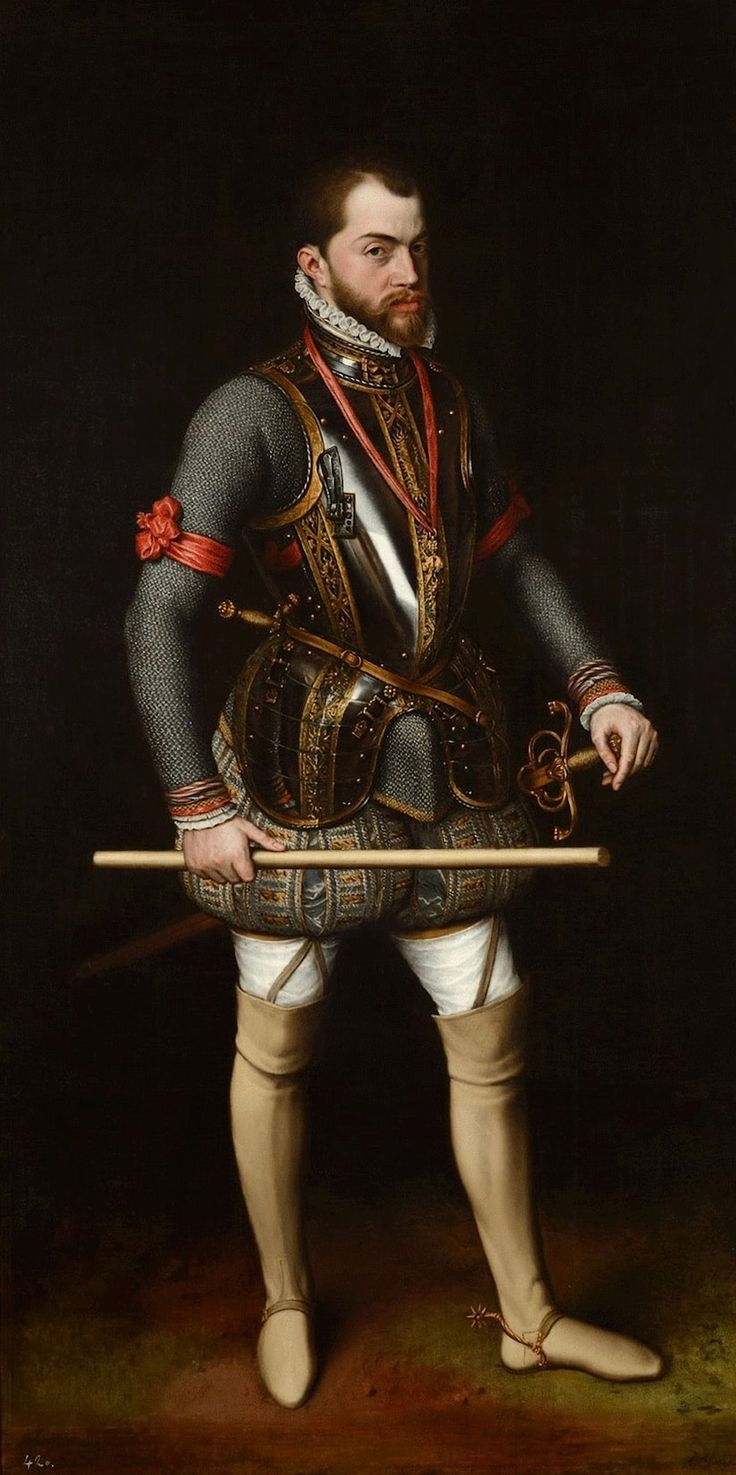
Philip II of Spain in armour

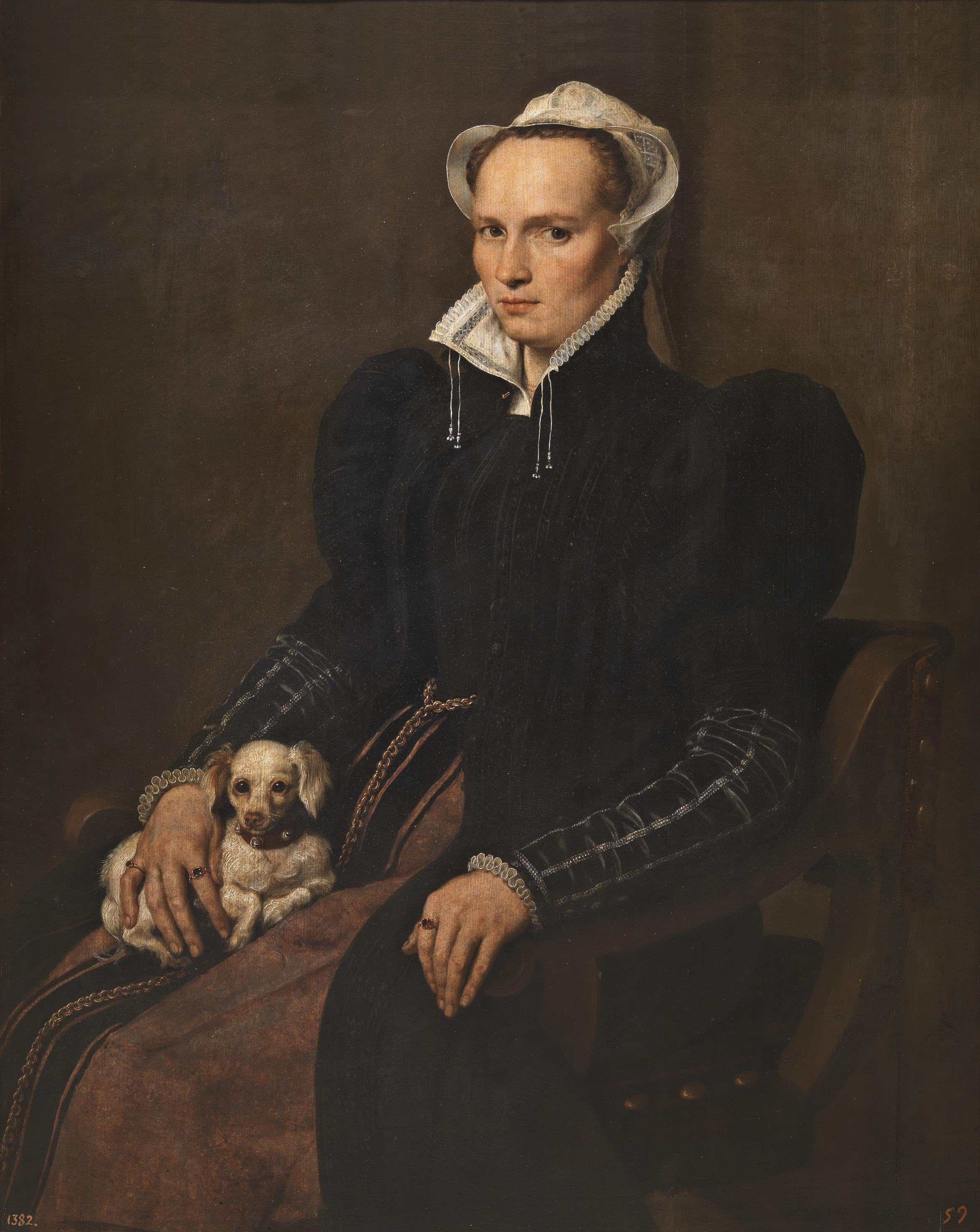
Metgen Mor, the artist's wife

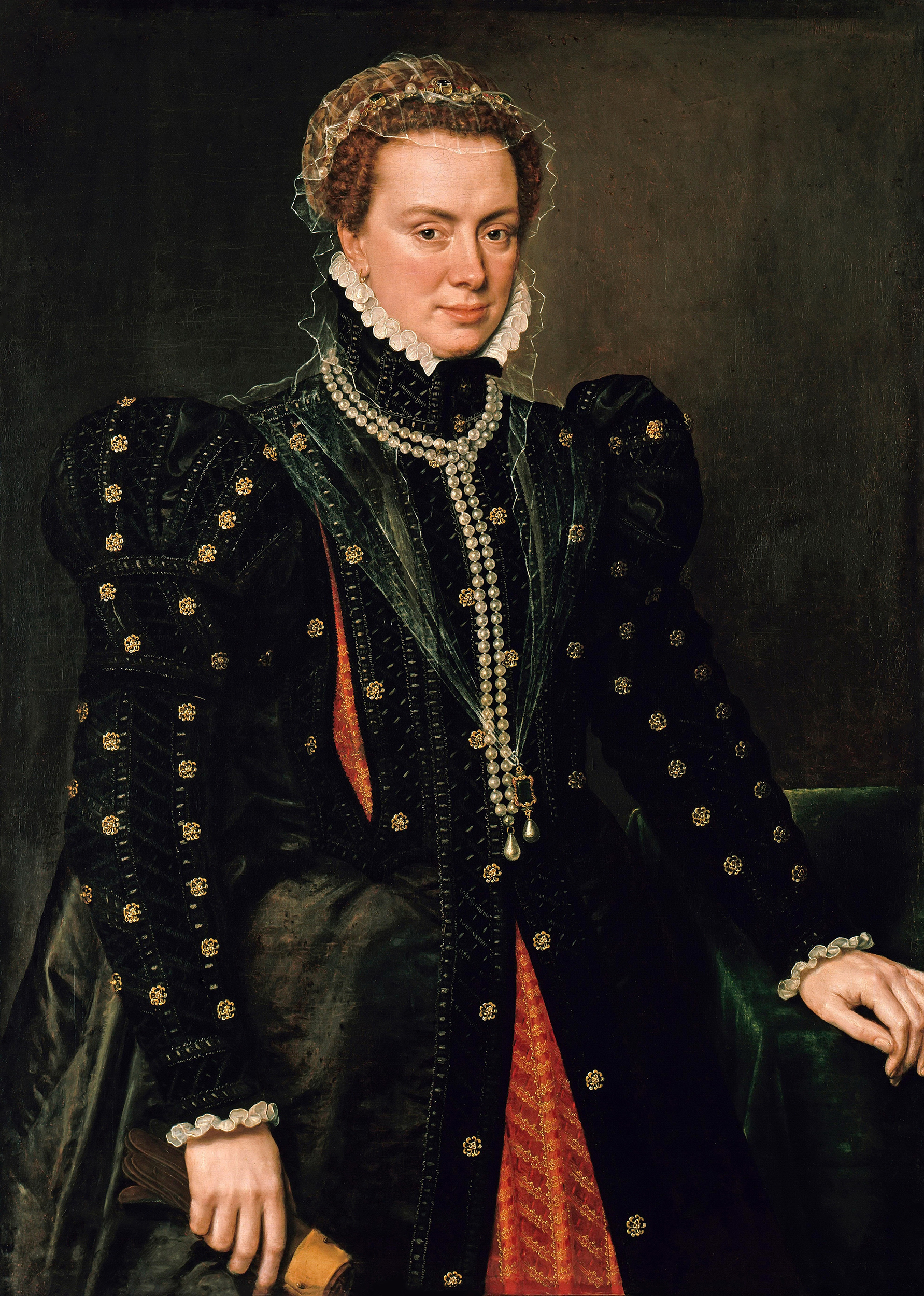
Margaret of Parma

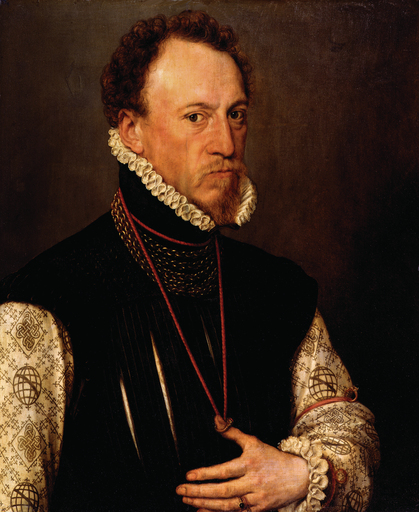
Henry Lee of Ditchley

== See also ==
- Artists of the Tudor court

== References and sources ==
Sources

- Annemarie Jordan, Retrato de Corte em Portugal. O Legado de António Moro (1552-1572, (Lisbon: Quetzal Editores, 1994)
- Annemarie Jordan, La Reina María de Inglaterra, segunda mujer de Felipe II, Antonio Moro, Museo del Prado, Enciclopedia Online
- Annemarie Jordan, Antonio Moro. Anton van Dashort Mor, Museo del Prado, Enciclopedia Online
- Georges Marlier, Anthonis Mor van Dashorst (Antonio Moro), Académie royale de Belgique, Classe des beaux-arts, Mémoires (Brussels: M. Hayez, 1934).
- Trevor-Roper, Hugh; Princes and Artists, Patronage and Ideology at Four Habsburg Courts 1517-1633, Thames & Hudson, London, 1976, ISBN 0-500-23232-6
- Joanna Woodall, Anthonis Mor; Art and Authority (Zwolle: Waanders Publishers, 2008).
- Marieke van Wamel Pictor regis. Anthonis Mor van Dashorst and his position as painter at the Habsburg court., Thesis BA University of Amsterdam, June 2009 Pictor regis - Van Wamel
- Marieke van Wamel Plumas y pinceles / Pennen en pinceelen. The portraits by Anthonis Mor van Dashorst and the treatises by Francisco de Holanda and Felipe de Guevara; a study into the mutual influences and the exchange of ideas on sixteenth century painting and portraiture. University of Amsterdam, thesis Researchmaster June 2011
